= Harald Penrose =

British test pilot (1904–1996)

- Born: Harald James Penrose; 12 April 1904; Hereford, England
- Died: 31 August 1996 (aged 92); Hardington Mandeville, England
- Known for: Test pilot and author
- Aviation career
- First flight: 1919; Avro 504K

Harald James Penrose, O.B.E, CEng, F.R.Ae.S, A.M.I.N.A (12 April 1904 – 31 August 1996) was the chief test pilot at Westland Aircraft between 1931 and 1953, a naval architect, and an aviation author. His flying experience ranged from man carrying kites before the First World War to early jet fighters and helicopters. He designed, built and flew his own glider in the 1930s, designed 36 boats and yachts, and wrote many books describing his flying career and the history of British aviation.

== Early life ==
Harald James Penrose was born at 103 Park Street Hereford on 12 April 1904, the son of James Penrose, an Inland Revenue clerk and his wife, Elizabeth Alice. His fascination with manned flight started at an early age when his father showed him pictures of Bleriot's monoplane. He first flew aged 7 in a man-lifting kite at the dizzying height of 10 ft. His first powered flight was in 1919, in a modified three-seat Avro 504K, piloted by Alan Cobham.

When he left school in 1920 he was unable to find an apprenticeship in the aircraft industry, so on the advice of Frederick Handley Page he attended the aeronautical engineering course at Northampton Engineering College, London University. During a visit to de Havilland he flew in the prototype Moth as a passenger, piloted by Hubert Broad. As part of his course he undertook industrial placements working for Handley Page Ltd and Westland Aircraft Ltd.

== Aviation career ==
After graduation in 1926 Penrose was employed by Westland Aircraft Ltd. He started work on the shop floor, later working as an observer for the test pilot Lawrence Openshaw, then as assistant to Capt. Geoffrey Hill supervising the construction of the Widgeon III prototype.

In 1927 he took 3 months of unpaid leave and learned to fly with Reserve of Air-Force Officers (RAFO) at Filton. There he first flew Bristol PTMs and later a Bristol Jupiter Fighter. During this training he met Cyril Uwins after the latter's encounter with control reversal in a Bristol Bagshot. Later, Uwins would mentor Penrose in the science of flight testing and they would become good friends.

On returning to Westlands he was employed working between the Works and the Design Office. Under the guidance of Westland's new test pilot, Louis Paget, Penrose became involved in test flying. (Note: Major Laurence P. Openshaw MA was killed after a mid-air collision on 6 June 1927 while racing the Widgeon I at the Whitsun Air Meeting at Bournemouth) He gained his A-licence which allowed him to fly as a private pilot and he flew Widgeons at weekend air displays, eventually becoming responsible for all Widgeon testing.

In 1928 he was appointed manager for civil aircraft and the managing director's (Robert Bruce) principal assistant at a salary of £400 per annum. While his main duty was the production of civil aircraft such as the Wessex he was later involved in test flying experimental Wapitis.

In 1931 he was sent to Argentina to demonstrate the Wapiti float plane but failed to secure any sales. He returned to England, took ten days leave but was recalled to Westlands after Paget was injured while performing low altitude aerobatics. This accident finished Paget's career but resulted in Penrose being promoted to chief test pilot.

== Test pilot ==
As Westland's chief test pilot, Harald Penrose established a number of unusual aviation records in the 1930s. He made one of the longest emergency glides in 1933, when the Westland Wallace, being prepared for the Huston Everest flight, suffered a fuel pump failure at 37,500 ft. He made the first parachute escape from an aircraft with an enclosed canopy in 1934 when the Westland PV.7 suffered a structural failure during diving trials. This was his first and only descent by parachute. And in the 1930s he accumulated the most flying hours in tailless aircraft, with the Pterodactyl IV and V.

Harald Penrose (far left) Sir Ernest Petter (gunner's cockpit) Geoffrey T.R. Hill (pterodactyl designer) Mr Mettam, Capt. Stuart Keep (Pilot of the ill-fated Westland Dreadnought)(far right)

In amongst the test flying he found the time to design and construct (with the aid of his wife, who stitched the fabric covering) the Penrose Pegasus glider. To get a performance comparison, he flew at the August 1935 BGA competition at Sutton Bank, accumulating a total of 6 hours 25 minutes. Up to the outbreak of war, the Pegasus was flown at Kimmeridge when the weather was not compatible with sailing.

In the late 1930s, Westlands developed the Lysander and the Whirlwind. Penrose's first flight in the Lysander was in June 1936. This and subsequent flights identified problems that required modification to the tail, The problems with the tailplane incidence were not solved to Harald's satisfaction and may have led to a number of fatal accidents.

Prior to flying the Whirlwind, to get experience of aircraft with high wing loadings and retractable undercarriages, Harald flew the Spitfire prototype K5054, the Fairey Battle prototype and a Bristol Blenheim. The first flight in the Whirlwind (October 1936) was unintentional when he became airborne during a straight high speed run, The early test flights were uneventful but in early 1939 a fractured exhaust burnt through the right aileron push rod at 200 ft, requiring instinctive action. This incident caused Teddy Petter to design a less aerodynamic but safer exhaust system.

== Second world war ==
As a reserve officer in the RAF, Penrose expected to be called up at the start of the war. However, at 36 and with valuable experience of test flying he was turned down by the RAF's personnel department. Instead, he returned to Lysander and Whirlwind development.

There were plans to use the Lysander for ground strafing during an invasion or as a night fighter. He tested various modified Lysanders fitted with gun turrets, including the tandem wing Lysander fitted with a tail gun turret.

In January 1942 he tested the last production Whirlwind, by then the main work at Westland was manufacturing Spitfires and Penrose was responsible for their production test flying.

During the war, Penrose had three encounters with the Messerschmitt Bf 109. In first occasion he was testing a production Whirlwind, when emerging from cloud, he realised he was on a collision course with a Messerschmitt and slammed the Whirlwind nose back into the cloud. On the second, he was with his family sailing their dingies 'Tittermouse' and 'Tiddlywinks', when they were buzzed by a low flying German. However, in 1943 he flew a captured aircraft being tested by Rolls-Royce. In his memoir he described how he 'froze on the controls and flew very, very straight' when he was intercepted by a RAF Spitfire.

Harald Penrose in the Welkin cockpit. Note the automatically inflating peripheral hood seal

Basing their design on the Whirlwind, Westland developed the Welkin high altitude interceptor, Penrose flying the prototype in November 1942. He described how the cabin was 'like sitting in an oven' due to the unshielded cabin pressurisation blowers. He developed pneumonia in early 1943 which he attributed to the extreme changes in temperature on leaving the Welkins cabin drenched in sweat and the bitter wind across the airfield. He survived thanks to the recently discovered M&B drug. As a result of this illness Petter devised a better method for cooling the cabin. Penrose contrasted the arctic conditions in the open cockpits of the PV.3/Wallace during the high altitude flights with the 'delightfully warm' cabin of the Welkin, describing these flights as the 'peak of experience'.

In the summer of 1945, he flew a Gloster Meteor as a guest of 616 Squadron. He described it as 'far easier and safer machine than that superb fighter the Spitfire'. But the experience was marred during landing by uncertainty that the undercarriage had locked down while simultaneously running low on fuel.

== Post war ==
=== Wyvern ===
After the war, Penrose led the flight testing of the Westland Wyvern. No other contemporary aircraft proved so lethal as the Wyvern. He attributed its problems to underdeveloped power plants in conjunction with a high wing loading and would later describe it as "one of those very nearly very good machines".

On 12 December 1946, he made the first flight in the Eagle engined prototype . This flight was uneventful, but early in 1947 he was forced to land it at grass airstrip at RAF Warmwell after an engine failure, narrowly missing a hidden concrete block. Other Westland test pilots were not so lucky. Sqn. Ldr. Peter Garner was killed on 15 October 1947 after the failure of the contra-rotating propeller bearing and Sqn. Ldr. Mike Graves was killed on 31 October 1949 after an engine failure in the Python powered prototype. Extraordinarily, Penrose's luck held out and he survived three further emergency landings, one in the summer of 1947 due to an aileron push rod failure, one in October 1951 due to hydraulic failure, the third in February 1952 after an engine failure.

It was probably attention to detail (such as wire locking the harness release lock) rather than luck that allowed Harald Penrose to pursue 25 years of test flying in reasonable safety.

=== Rotorcraft ===
Under the encouragement of Arthur Davenport and Teddy Petter, Westland's had a long history with rotorcraft starting with the Cierva C.29. In preparation for this work Penrose took an autogyro conversion course at Cierva's Hanworth Air park in 1933, during which he added 10 hours of autogyro flying to his commercial licence. However, neither the Cierva C.29 or its successor the C.30 were successful and Penrose did not fly either of them. In 1944 when Westlands were considering post war business opportunities, Penrose suggested to Davenport that they cash in on their earlier experience of rotorcraft and investigate helicopters.

Subsequently, he flew the Sikorsky S-51 under the supervision of Charles 'Sox' Hosegood. While he believed that he could assimilate the piloting techniques because of his earlier experience with autogyros he thought it was wise to get tuition from more experienced pilots, hence Westlands employed Alan Bristow to train Penrose and Peter Garner. Penrose went solo in the Sikorsky S-51 in 1947. In comparison with the Wyvern his flights in helicopters were infrequent, far less arduous and far less risky.

In 1953 after 25 years of test Harald retired from the role of chief test pilot to take over Westland's helicopter sales.

== Writing career ==
Harald demonstrated a talent for writing at an early age, winning his school's premier prize for literature. His early books drew on personal experiences, such as I Flew with the Birds (1949), No Echo in the Sky (1958), and Airymouse (1967), In his later works he wrote about the history of the British aircraft industry: Architect of Wings (1985), a biography of the Avro designer Roy Chadwick, Wings across the World (1980), a history of British Airways, and a five-volume history of British aviation.

== Bibliography ==
- I Flew with the Birds (1949)
- No Echo in the Sky (1958)
- Airymouse (1967)
- British Aviation: The Pioneer Years 1903–1914 Putnam (1967)
- British Aviation: The Great War And Armistice, 1915–1919 (1969)
- British Aviation: Adventuring Years, 1920–1929 (1973)
- British Aviation: Widening Horizons, 1930–1934 (1979)
- British Aviation: The Ominous Skies, 1935–1939 (1980)
- Wings across the World: An illustrated history of British Airways (1980)
- Cloud Cuckooland (1981)
- Adventure with Fate (1984)
- Architect of Wings: A biography of Roy Chadwick, designer of the Lancaster Bomber (1985)
- An Ancient Air: A Biography of John Stringfellow of Chard, the Victorian aeronautical pioneer (1988),

== Cited sources ==
- "Britain's Test Pilots, No 12 – Harald James Penrose" (PDF). Flight: 78–80. 25 July 1946.
- Penrose, Harald (17 October 1935). "A MULTUM-in-PARVO SAILPLANE" (PDF). Flight: 420–421.
- Penrose, Harald (1958). No echo in the sky. Cassall.
- Penrose, Harald (1984). Adventure with fate. Airlife.
- Jarrett, Philip (11 September 1996). "Obituary: Harald Penrose". The Independent.
- Shore, Barry (Autumn 1989). "Prototype Parade: Penrose Pegasus" (PDF). RC Modeller: 45–48. Archived from the original (PDF) on 1 February 2014.
- Jarrett, Philip (2004). "Penrose, Harald James (1904–1996)". Oxford Dictionary of National Biography (online ed.). Oxford University Press. doi:10.1093/ref:odnb/63333. (Subscription, Wikipedia Library access or UK public library membership required.)
