= Arthur Davenport (aeronautical engineer) =

Aircraft designer (1891–1976)

- Born: 9 July 1891
- Died: 31 August 1976 (aged 85)
- Engineering career
- Discipline: Aeronautical engineering
- Employer: Westland Aircraft Ltd

Arthur Davenport F.R.Ae.S (9 July 1891 – 31 August 1976) was a British aircraft engineer working for Westland Aircraft in Yeovil, Somerset.

When the Westland Aircraft Works was created by the Petter twins in 1915, Arthur was one of the first draughtsman to be recruited from Petter's Ltd. He was chief designer from 1919, working under the direction of Teddy Petter from May 1934 until 1944, when Petter left (to join English Electric) and Davenport became technical director. According to Harald Penrose, he was made the scapegoat for the late delivery of the Wyvern and headed into retirement in March 1952.

In the 1920s, when most aircraft were biplanes, Arthur was a strong proponent of the monoplane. Most of his monoplane designs were high-winged or parasol, culminating in the Lysander. During his career he was involved in the design of the following fixed-wing aircraft.

- Westland Limousine Chief draughtsman
- Westland Wagtail Chief draughtsman/Designer
- Westland Weasel Chief draughtsman/Designer
- Westland Woodpigeon
- Westland Widgeon Chief designer
- Westland Wizard
- Westland Wapiti/Wallace
- Westland Interceptor
- Westland Wessex
- Westland PV.3
- Westland Wallace
- Westland PV.7
- Westland F.7/30
- Westland Lysander
- Westland Whirlwind
- Westland Welkin
- Westland Wyvern Technical director

In the early 1930s he worked with Juan de la Cierva to develop the Cierva C.29 and Cierva CL.20 autogyros. It was this interest in rotary winged aircraft that would lead Westland to manufacture Sikorsky helicopters in the early 1950s.

== Patents ==
- GB patent 742240, Arthur Davenport, "Improvements in or relating to apparatus for facilitating landing of aircraft", issued 21 December 1955, assigned to Westland Aircraft Ltd
