= Houston–Mount Everest flight expedition =

1933 aircraft flight by Douglas-Hamilton and David McIntyre

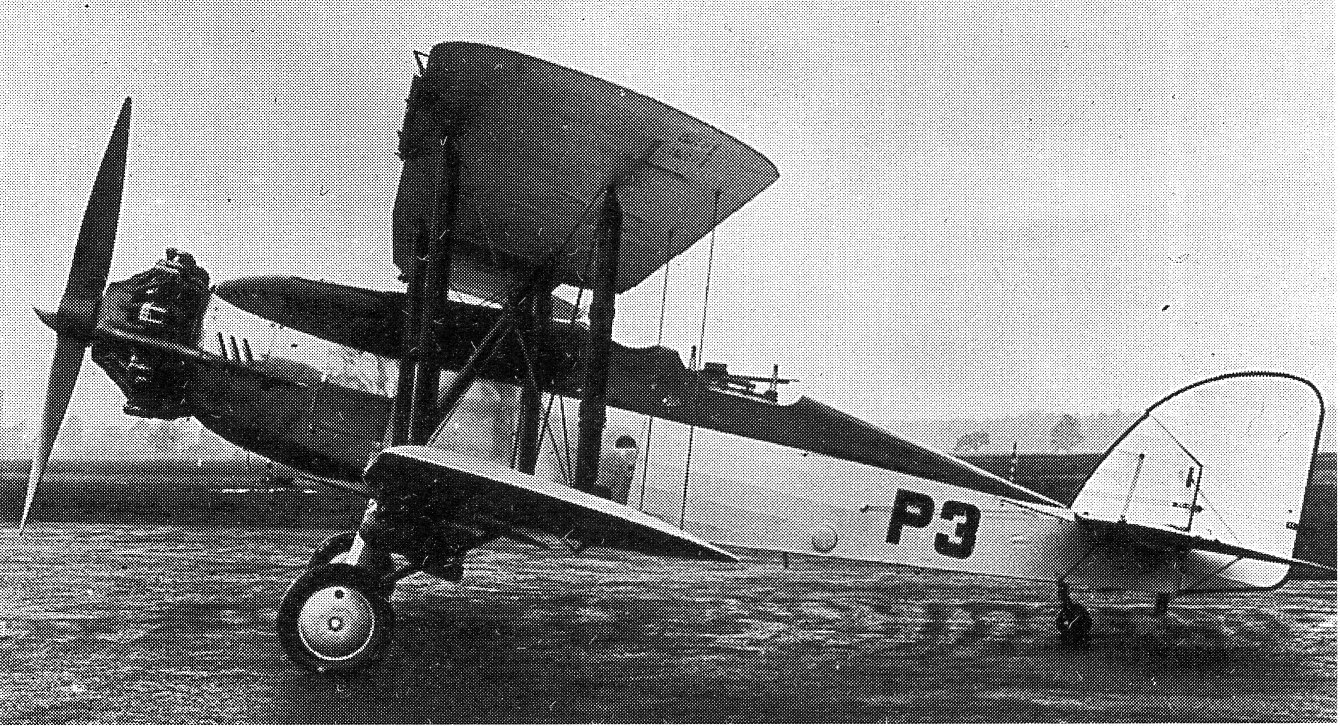
The Westland PV-3 that flew over Everest, pictured in 1931 prior to being modified for the expedition.

The first flight over Mount Everest was undertaken in April 1933 by two Westland aircraft. They were piloted by Lord Clydesdale and David McIntyre, with Stewart Blacker and Sidney Bonnett in the observer seats. The expedition was financed by Lucy, Lady Houston and led by Peregrine Fellowes.

== Background ==
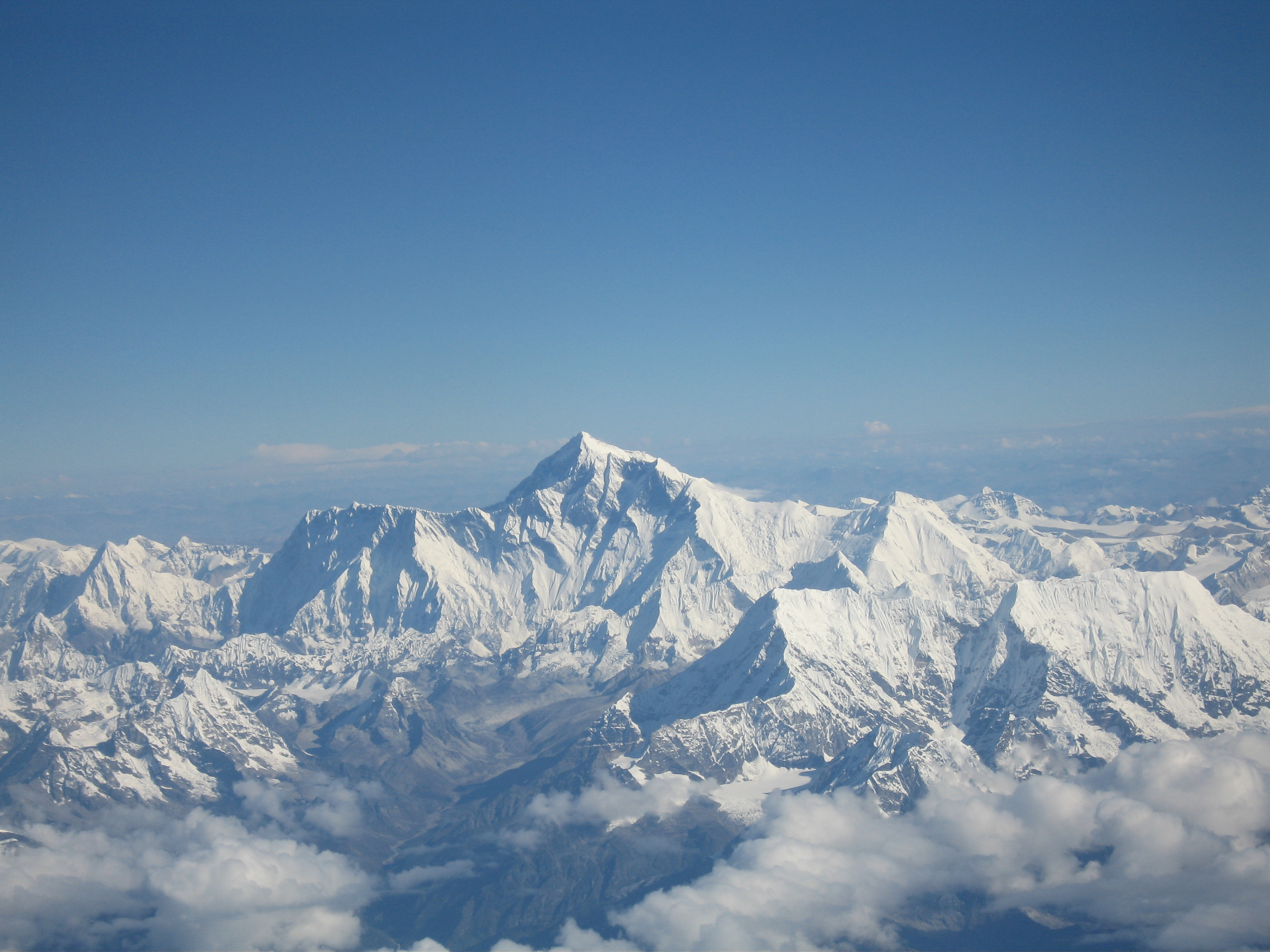
Aerial view of Mount Everest from the south, taken in 2006.

Prior to the First World War (1914–1918), aircraft were limited to altitudes below about 10,000 feet (3,000 m). Technical advances in military aviation during that war, such as the invention of turbocharged and supercharged aircraft engines, allowed aircraft to reach higher altitudes. In 1918, Alexander Kellas (a British mountaineering physiologist) suggested that aircraft would soon be able to fly over Mount Everest, the highest mountain on Earth at 8,848 metres (29,029 ft), which would be useful for reconnaissance of potential climbing routes. At that time, the mountain had never been climbed. In 1919, Jean Casale made the first flight to exceed the altitude of Everest, but only for a short period, and actually flying over the mountain would be far more challenging. The main limitation of high altitude flight at this time was keeping the crews alive in the low pressure and cold air.

No progress on the idea was made during the 1920s, partly because the diplomatic Affair of the Dancing Lamas prevented any attempt to climb the mountain from 1925 to 1933. In the early 1930s, John Buchan (a member of parliament (MP) for Scottish Universities) became concerned that aviation firsts were being dominated by American aviators. Buchan approached Lord Clydesdale (MP for East Renfrewshire) to suggest a flight over Everest that would promote British aviation. Clydesdale was also the youngest squadron leader in the Royal Air Force (he commanded the reserve 602 Squadron, which was equipped with Westland Wapiti biplanes), and the son of Alfred Douglas-Hamilton, 13th Duke of Hamilton.

No attempt could be made without substantial funding, so in September 1932 Clydesdale visited Lucy, Lady Houston at Kinrara (her estate in Scotland) to ask her to fund the expedition. The nationalistic Lady Houston was excited, feeling that flying over Everest would strengthen British rule in India (Houston was an outspoken opponent of the Indian independence movement) and impressed that Clydesdale had worn his kilt for dinner. She agreed to fund the expedition and became involved in its planning.

== Planning ==
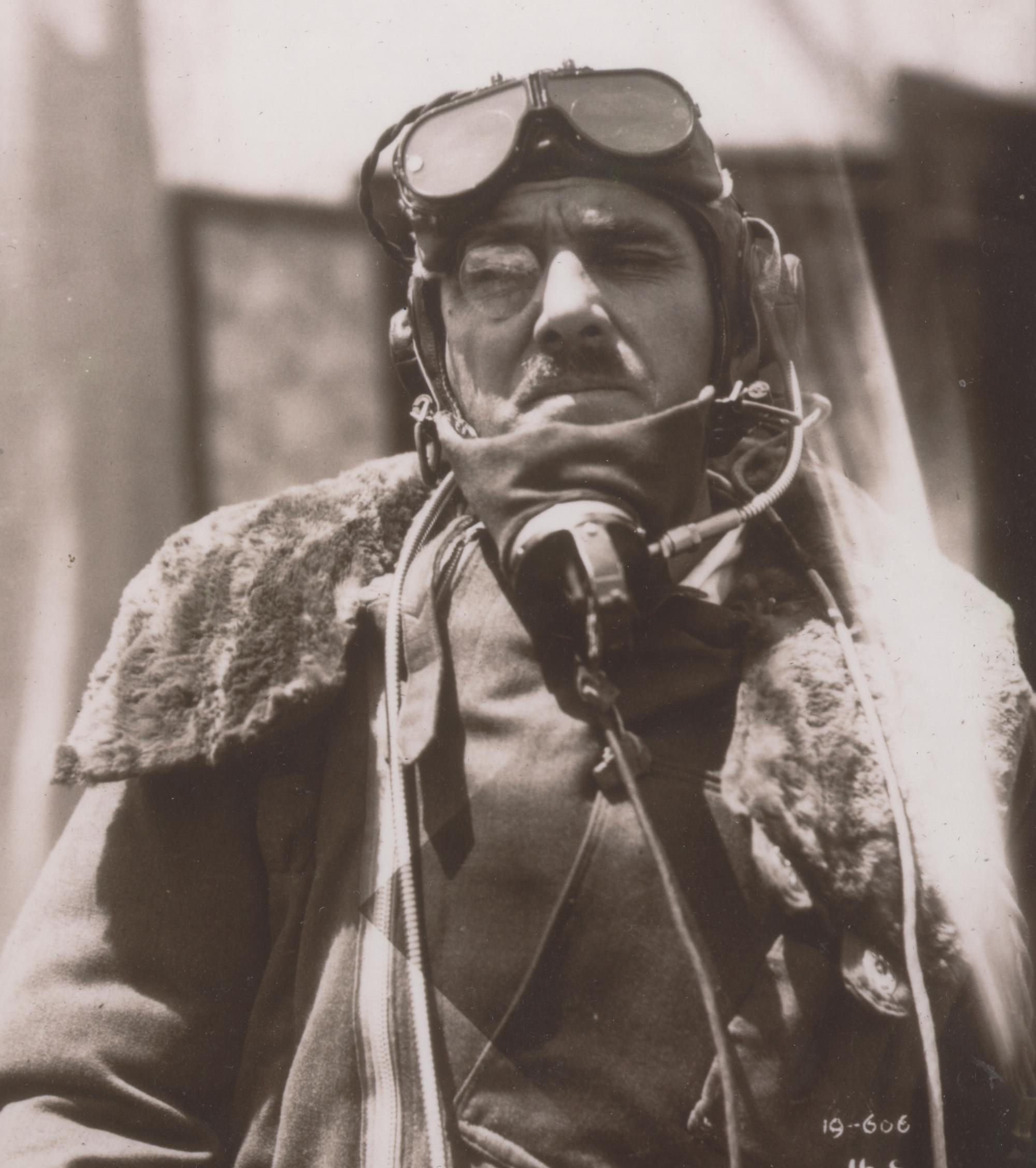
Stewart Blacker in 1933, wearing flying gear and a monocle.

The inventor Stewart Blacker joined the expedition. He was an experienced pilot who had served in the British Indian Army from 1907 to 1932 (reaching the rank of major), so was familiar with the region. Air commodore Peregrine Fellowes was brought in to lead the expedition and head its planning. Fellowes and Blacker obtained permission from the Air Ministry, India Office and the government of Nepal to allow the flight. Nepal granted permission for a single flight, while the 13th Dalai Lama of Tibet refused permission for the aircraft to enter Tibetan airspace.

Blacker also convinced the Royal Geographical Society that a flight would provide valuable information for the planned 1933 British Mount Everest expedition, which aimed to climb to the summit. A flight might also search for evidence of George Mallory and Andrew Irvine, who had disappeared during an attempt to reach the summit during the 1924 expedition. If Mallory and Irvine had reached the summit before dying on the descent, they might have left some record or abandoned equipment at the summit. The Royal Geographical Society agreed to support the expedition.

Clydesdale decided to use two biplane aircraft for the attempt: the first Westland PV-6 to be built (a prototype of the Westland Wallace bomber), registered G-ACBR; and a modified Westland PV-3, registered G-ACAZ (referred to as the Houston-Westland). He selected David Fowler McIntyre, a flight lieutenant from 602 Squadron, to pilot the other aircraft. Each pilot would be accompanied by an observer in the second seat of the aircraft: Blacker accompanied Clydesdale in the PV-3, and Sidney R. G. Bonnett, a cinematographer for Gaumont British News, accompanied McIntyre in the PV-6.

Blacker modified both aircraft to enclose the observer positions while retaining open pilots' cockpits. Oxygen systems were installed to keep the crew alive using oxygen masks. The crews wore multiple layers of sheepskin clothing and the aircraft were modified to provide connections for heated flying suits. To save weight, there were no parachutes. Special fuel was developed that would not freeze at the low temperatures expected. The supplies of fuel and oxygen were sufficient for 15 minutes at high altitude. Both aircraft had fixed downwards-pointing film cameras in the fuselage while the observers carried still cameras. Bonnett selected a Williamson Automatic Eagle III camera.

== Expedition ==
Both aircraft were shipped from Britain to Karachi by sea, arriving in February. The crews then flew the aircraft to Purnea, in Bihar state, where they were based at Lalbalu Airfield, approximately 50 miles (80 km) south of Mount Everest. The journey from England had taken 25 days.

The flight would require clear weather over the mountain, which was reconnoitred at 5.30am each day by a third aircraft, a Puss Moth flown by Fellowes. For nine days, conditions were judged to be unsuitable. While they waited the expedition crews relaxed by swimming, until an encounter with a crocodile required McIntyre to shoot the animal. On 3 April, Fellowes reported no clouds between the airfield and the summit. Winds were below 40 miles per hour (60 km/h) but there was lots of dust in the atmosphere. Fellowes described conditions as "reasonably satisfactory".

The expedition took off from Lulbalu at 8:25 am on 3 April. After 9 am they reached their maximum altitude of 31,000 ft (9,400 m) as they passed over Lhotse, the fourth-highest mountain in the world, located 3 km (1.8 miles) south of Everest. Downward air currents induced by the mountains then caused both aircraft to lose about 1,500 feet (460 m).

Bonnett began to experience hypoxia due to an damaged oxygen line; he successfully repaired the leak with a handkerchief. A strap holding McIntyre's oxygen mask broke, forcing him to hold it in place with one hand while flying the aircraft with the other. At 10:05 am both planes passed approximately 100 feet (30 m) over the summit. McIntyre required three attempts to pass over the summit. Clydesdale looked for signs of Mallory and Irvine, but saw none (Mallory's body was found in 1999 and Irvine's partial remains were found in 2024 - both were well below the summit). The aircraft then had to make a sharp turn to avoid entering Tibet. Both aircraft returned to the airfield about 3 hours after they had departed.

News of the successful flight was sent to London by telegram. The reply congratulated the team but forbade them from repeating the feat, due to the dangerous problems with the oxygen supply. However, the quality of the photographs taken on the first flight was compromised by dust, so the crews ignored the instructions and made a second flight in clear weather on 19 April. This time they were able to obtain high-quality photographs of the surface.

== Aftermath ==
The Guardian reported that "It is a splendid achievement - not for any material gains, any additions to aeronautical knowledge that it brings, for it brings few or none, but simply because it was one of the few last great spectacular flights in aviation which remained to be done."

The aerial photographs were obtained too late to assist the 1933 British Mount Everest expedition, which had already reached Rongbuk Monastery – on the other side of the Himalayas from the airfield – and was ultimately unsuccessful. The photographs were made public in 1951 and were used by Edmund Hillary and Tenzing Norgay to plan their route to the top of Mount Everest, which they successfully climbed in 1953.

A half-hour documentary film about the flight, Wings Over Everest, won an Academy Award in 1936. It combined real footage from the expedition with staged shots of the participants (not actors).

Fellowes, Blacker and Percy Thomas Etherton wrote a book, First Over Everest! The Houston-Mount Everest Expedition, 1933 which was published in 1934. Buchan wrote the foreword.
