= Wings Over Everest =

1934 film

Wings over Everest
- Directed by: Geoffrey Barkas; Ivor Montagu
- Cinematography: S. R. Bonnett; A. L. Fisher; J. Rosenthal
- Music by: Hubert Bath
- Production company: Gaumont-British
- Distributed by: Gaumont-British
- Release date: June 1934
- Running time: 22 minutes
- Country: United Kingdom
- Language: English

Wings over Everest is a 1934 British short documentary film directed by Geoffrey Barkas and Ivor Montagu.

== Scenario ==
The film describes the 1933 Houston–Mount Everest flight expedition, in which Douglas Douglas-Hamilton, 14th Duke of Hamilton, otherwise known as Lord Clydesdale, piloted a single-engined biplane on 3 April 1933, just clearing Everest's southern peak by a few feet, having been caught in a powerful downdraught. The film used mixture of real footage of Everest from the record-breaking flight and theatrically produced scenes using the actual people rather than actors.

== Production ==
The flight used two aircraft that took off from Purnea, India on 3 April 1933. One aircraft was Westland PV-3 which had undergone some additional changes, and the other aircraft was a Westland PV-6. Lord Clydesdale flew the PV-3 and Lieutenant David McIntyre in the PV-6. The aircraft were not pressurized but they did use bottled oxygen.

Aerial photos would go onto be used by mountaineers including Tenzing and Hillary's expedition which reached the summit on foot. The aerial photos were made on a second flight on 19 April 1933 as during the first flight there was a dusty haze that obscured the photographs from the 3 April flight.

== Reception ==
The Monthly Film Bulletin wrote: "The flight itself is genuinely exciting, in spite of the difficulty of conveying a vivid impression of great heights by aerial photography, due to the expert camera work of S. R. Bonnett. Material has been well arranged without over-dramatisation, and the commentary is admirable. ... Occasionally a grotesque vista of rock breaks through the rolling waves of cloud, like an islet in the sea. Everest itself is dwarfed by the nonchalance of its conquerors."

== Preservation status ==
Wings over Everest was preserved by the Academy Film Archive in 2014, in partnership with the UCLA Film and Television Archive.

== Accolades ==
The film received an Academy Award in 1936 for Best Short Subject (Novelty).

== See also ==
- List of media related to Mount Everest
- List of Mount Everest records
