= Westland CL.20 =

CL.20

General information
- Type: Two seat cabin autogyro
- National origin: United Kingdom
- Manufacturer: Westland
- Number built: 1 completed, 6 airframes not completed

History
- First flight: 5 February 1935
- Developed from: Cierva-Lepère CL.10B

The Westland CL.20 (aka Cierva-Lepère C.31) was a two-seat autogyro designed and built by Westland Aircraft between 1934 and 1938. One flying prototype and six airframes were built, which had control problems and insufficient lift. Before these problems could be solved the programme was abandoned and the prototype was scrapped in 1938.

== Development ==
Before the Westland C.29 had proven to be a failure, "Teddy" Petter sought to design another cabin autogyro in collaboration with George Lepère, a French autogyro designer with the Lioré et Olivier aircraft company. The initial design was by Georges Lepère in association with the Cierva Autogiro Company and was based on the Cierva-Lepère C.L. 10B. Detailed design was by Westland's Arthur Davenport and Petter.

Construction was completed in December 1934 and in January 1935 taxi-ing trials were carried out at Yeovil by Harald Penrose, after which it was transported to the Cierva flight test centre at Hanworth Aerodrome, where Juan de la Cierva flew the prototype on its first flight on 5 February 1935. During development flying, carried out by R.A.C. Brie, the CL.20 exhibited over-sensitive lateral control and was unable to exceed a height of 300 ft (91 m). To improve lift, a more powerful Niagra engine was fitted but this made little difference.

Despite the poor performance of the prototype, Teddy Petter persuaded Westland to manufacture another six airframes, but further development was abandoned due to emerging work as a result of the threat of war. At the end of development flying the prototype had logged 8 hours 31 minutes flying time over 61 flights, before the flying prototype was scrapped in 1938.

== Design ==
Based on the CL.10B, the load bearing structure of the CL.20s fuselage was based on three welded seamless steel tubes (forming a flat bottomed triangle in cross section) carrying light alloy formers. On this, light alloy stringers were fixed and covered in fabric, producing a multi-faceted surface. The cabin structure consisted of a light-alloy arched former at the back with a wooden floor. On each side a large door and additional windows reached down to the bottom longeron, giving both excellent access and downward vision.

The three-bladed rotor could be folded for storage and transport. Three fins were fitted, two as endplates to the tail-plane, one half of which was fitted with negative camber and incidence, in order to help offset the effects of the rotor.

The CL.20 was initially powered by a 70 hp (52 kW) Pobjoy radial engine, driving a two-bladed tractor propeller, modified to include a power take-off shaft to spin up the rotors for take off. During flight testing, in an attempt to improve performance, a more powerful Pobjoy Niagara III was fitted.

== Specifications ==
Data from James and Augusta Westland

General characteristics

- Crew: 1
- Capacity: 1 passenger
- Length: 31 ft 9 in (9.68 m)
- Height: 10 ft 3 in (3.12 m)
- Empty weight: 840 lb (381 kg)
- Gross weight: 1,400 lb (635 kg)
- Powerplant: 1 × Pobjoy S Niagara III 7-cylinder air-cooled radial piston engine, 95 hp (71 kW)
- Main rotor diameter: 32 ft 0 in (9.75 m)
- Propellers: 2-bladed fixed pitch wooden propeller, 7 ft 3 in (2.21 m) diameter

Performance

- Maximum speed: 106 mph (171 km/h, 92 kn)
- Landing speed: 25 mph (40 km/h; 22 kn)
