= Penrose Pegasus =

British single-seat glider, 1935

Pegasus

General information
- Type: Single seat glider
- National origin: United Kingdom
- Designer: H.J. Penrose
- Number built: 1

History
- First flight: 21 July 1935

The Penrose Pegasus was a 1930s high-wing, single-seat, wooden glider from the UK. Designed, built and flown by Harald Penrose until the start of World War II, only one was built at the time though a reproduction was constructed in the 1990s.

== Design and development ==
In 1932 Penrose, Chief Test Pilot at Westland Aircraft from 1931–53, began the design of a wooden single-seat glider. One unusual design constraint was that no component could be more the 12 ft 6 in (3.81 m) long in order for it to leave the workshop.

The wing of the Pegasus had the same spar and planform as the unbuilt Cloudcraft Junior. It was constructed around a single box spar of spruce and plywood and had three sections, a parallel-chord centre section and two slightly longer, tapered outer panels with ailerons along the whole of their trailing edges. It was fabric covered and braced with lift struts to the lower fuselage longerons. Both rudder and elevator were all-moving surfaces, fabric covered and with rounded trailing edges. The rudder extended to the lower fuselage so the elevator, mounted on the upper fuselage, had a cut-out to allow its movement.

The Pegasus had a rectangular-section, ply-covered fuselage, which tapered towards the tail. The wing was braced above the fuselage by the struts and the open, unscreened cockpit was under the leading edge; fabric-covered, inverted V-shaped decking tapered from the lower wing surface rearwards. There was a short, curved landing skid fixed at the nose and joined to the lower longerons at the same point as the lift struts by a V-form pair of telescopic compression struts. Initially the Pegasus had a tailskid but flight trials showed that both skids were easily broken, so the main skid was replaced with a stiffer one and the tailskid by a rubber tailwheel.

== Operational history ==
The Pegasus flew for the first time in 1935 and gained its British Gliding Association certificate of airworthiness no. BGA 232. Early test flights with the improved undercarriage were made in July and August at Maiden Newton, home of the Dorset Gliding Club. It flew in the annual BGA competition held at Sutton Bank in late August 1935 as no.20. Until the outbreak of war Penrose often flew the Pegasus from Kimmeridge, on the Dorset coast, at weekends. The Pegasus survived World War II and afterwards underwent modifications, never completed, to enlarge the cockpit. This, the only example built, was later burnt.

A reproduction of the Pegasus, called the Pegasus 2, flew in 1993 and is now on display at the Norfolk and Suffolk Aviation Museum.

== Specifications ==
Data from British Gliders and Sailplanes 1922-1970

General characteristics

- Length: 15 ft 9 in (4.80 m)
- Wingspan: 34 ft 4 in (10.47 m)
- Wing area: 91.8 sq ft (8.53 m^{2})
- Aspect ratio: 13
- Airfoil: Modified Göttingen 535
- Empty weight: 135 lb (61 kg)
- Gross weight: 275 lb (125 kg)

Performance

- Rate of sink: 162 ft/min (0.82 m/s) minimum
- Lift-to-drag: 20.5 maximum
- Wing loading: 3.0 lb/sq ft (15 kg/m^{2})
