= Westland PV-3 =

PV-3
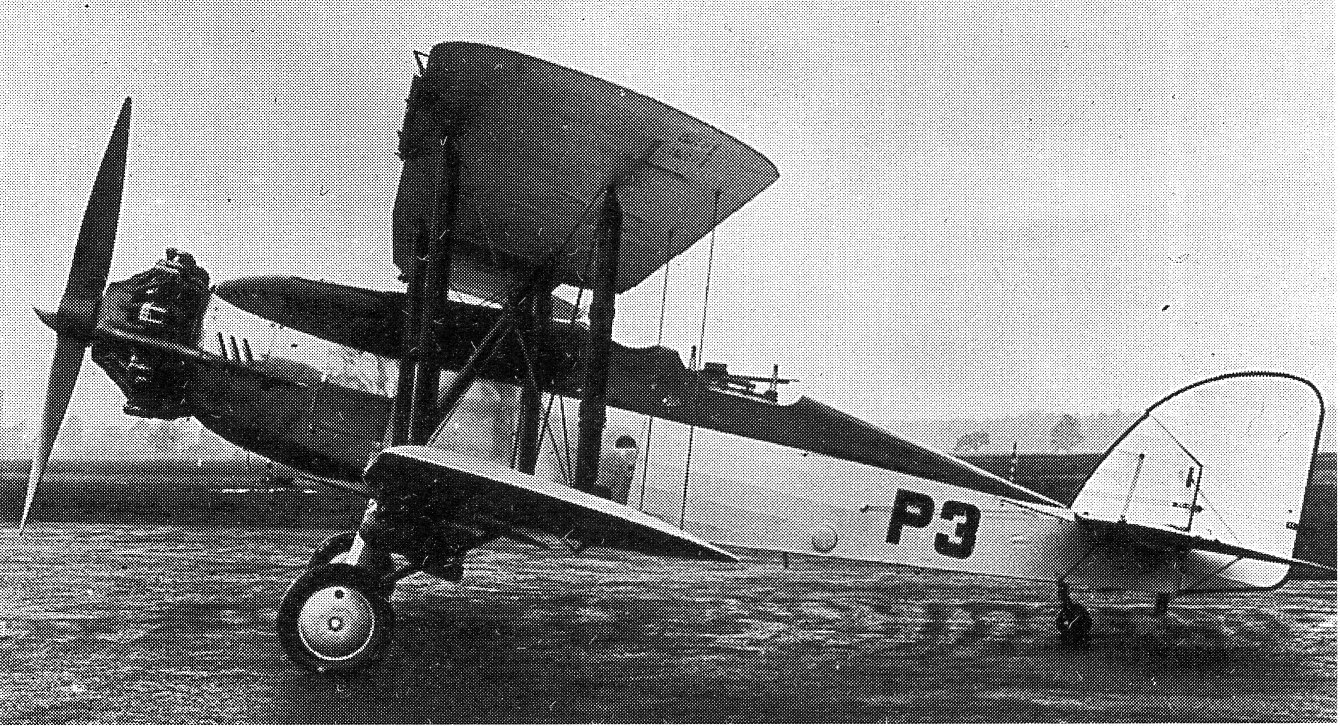
- Westland PV-3 at Martlesham in December 1931

General information
- Type: Torpedo bomber
- Manufacturer: Westland Aircraft
- Designer: Arthur Davenport
- Primary users: Royal Geographical Society Royal Air Force
- Number built: 1

History
- Introduction date: 1933
- First flight: February 1931

The Westland PV-3 was a British two-seat torpedo bomber of the 1930s built by Westland Aircraft Works. The aircraft was a private venture development and based on the Westland Wapiti. It never entered production. The aircraft is best known as one of the first two to fly over Everest as part of the Houston-Mount Everest Flight Expedition.

== History ==
The PV-3 design was produced in 1930 as a private venture two-seat aircraft that could be used as either a carrier-based torpedo bomber intended to carry a new lightweight torpedo being developed by the Admiralty, or as an army-co-operation aircraft. As such, it was a development of the Wapiti, with an all-metal structure and folding two-bay wings. It was powered by a 575 hp (429 kW) Bristol Jupiter XFA radial engine, having a defensive armament of one forward-firing Vickers machine gun and a Lewis gun on a Scarff ring on the observer's cockpit. It could carry either the planned 1,000 lb (455 kg) torpedo under the fuselage or an equivalent weight of bombs under the wings.

It first flew in February 1931, showing good performance (in particular, a high ceiling) and handling when tested by the Aeroplane and Armament Experimental Establishment at Martlesham Heath. Despite this, no orders resulted, and the lightweight torpedo was cancelled.

In November 1932, the PV-3 was chosen, together with the Westland PV-6 (the prototype of the Westland Wallace) for the Houston Mount Everest Flying Expedition to fly over and photograph Mount Everest. The aircraft, now registered G-ACAZ, was remodelled with a rear cabin and a 630 hp Bristol Pegasus engine driving a large diameter propeller. It was test flown from Yeovil in the new configuration, and on 25 January 1933 reached a height of 35,000 ft.

Flown by Lord Clydesdale with Stewart Blacker as observer and photographer, it was accompanied by the Wallace as, on 3 April 1933, the two aircraft became the first to fly over Mount Everest, flying over Kangchenjunga on 4 April and making a second flight over Everest (as the initial flight had produced inadequate photographs for map-making) on 19 April 1933. The PV-3 was later exhibited at Selfridges department store in London in July 1933. In December 1933 the aircraft, given the military serial K4048, was issued to Bristol Aircraft as an engine testbed. The aircraft is also referred to as the Houston-Westland in honour of Lady Houston who had financed the 1933 expedition.

== Operators ==
United Kingdom

- Royal Air Force
- Royal Geographical Society

== Specifications (Houston Westland) ==
Data from Westland Aircraft since 1915

General characteristics

- Crew: 2
- Length: 34 ft 2 in (10.41 m)
- Wingspan: 46 ft 6 in (14.17 m)
- Height: 11 ft 8 in (3.56 m)
- Wing area: 500 sq ft (46 m^{2})
- Empty weight: 3,420 lb (1,551 kg)
- Powerplant: 1 × Bristol Pegasus IS3 9-cylinder air-cooled radial piston engine, 630 hp (470 kW)
- Propellers: 2-bladed fixed-pitch propeller

Performance

- Maximum speed: 163 mph (262 km/h, 142 kn)
- Service ceiling: 35,000 ft (11,000 m)
- Time to altitude: 20,000 ft (6,100 m) in 20 minutes
