= Hubert Bath =

British composer

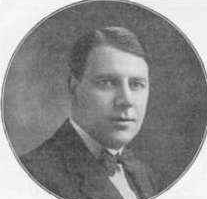
Hubert Bath

Hubert Charles Bath (6 November 1883 – 24 April 1945) was an English film composer, music director, and conductor. His credits include the music to the Oscar-winning documentary Wings Over Everest (1934), as well as to the films Tudor Rose (1936), A Yank at Oxford (1938) and Love Story (1944). His composition "Out of the Blue" has been used as the theme music of BBC Radio's Sports Report since the programme started in 1948.

== Biography ==
Bath was born in Barnstaple, Devon. He sang in the local church choir and in 1899 attended the Royal Academy of Music, studying piano with Oscar Beringer and composition with Frederick Corder. In 1913-14 he conducted Thomas Quinlan's opera troupe on its world tour, also acting as chorus master. He conducted Madame Butterfly at the London Opera House in July 1915, in a performance that starred Tamaki Miura. After that he established himself as a composer of light operas, including Young England (Birmingham, 1915) and Bubbole (Milan, 1920), extending the genre towards grand opera with Trilby. He went on to compose many film scores (including part of the soundtrack of Alfred Hitchcock's Blackmail in 1929), marches for brass bands, orchestral suites, theatre music and choral works.

His composition "Out of the Blue" has been used as the theme music of the BBC's Sports Report, the world's longest-running sports radio programme, since the show started in 1948. Also well-known is his Cornish Rhapsody, written for, and essential to the plot of, the 1944 film Love Story. Humorous cantatas such as The Wedding of Shon Maclean (1909), Look at the Clock (1910) and The Wake of O'Connor (1914) were popular with choral societies in their day. There are also many suites of character pieces for piano, including Shakespeare Pieces (1916), My Lady (1923), the Italian Suite (1924), the Gaelic Suite (five Irish sketches for piano), published in 1927, and the Sonnet Suite (1933). Freedom, a 12 minute symphonic piece first used for the National Championships in 1922, is said to be the first brass band symphony, although it is really a suite.

In 1924, Bath was named as co-respondent in the divorce case between Colonel Alfred Rawlinson and the actress Jean Aylwin.

Bath died in Harefield, Middlesex in 1945, aged 61. His son John Bath (1915–2004) was also a film composer.

== Selected filmography ==
- Under the Greenwood Tree (1929)
- The Informer (1929)
- The Plaything (1929)
- Tell England (1931)
- Evensong (1934 - uncredited)
- Wings Over Everest (1934)
- Breakers Ahead (1935)
- His Lordship (1936)
- The Luck of the Irish (1936)
- Tudor Rose (1936)
- Non-Stop New York (1937)
- The Great Barrier (1937)
- A Yank at Oxford (1938)
- Dear Octopus (1943)
- Love Story (1944)
