= Stewart Blacker =

British Army officer and weapon inventor (1887–1964)

Latham Valentine Stewart Blacker
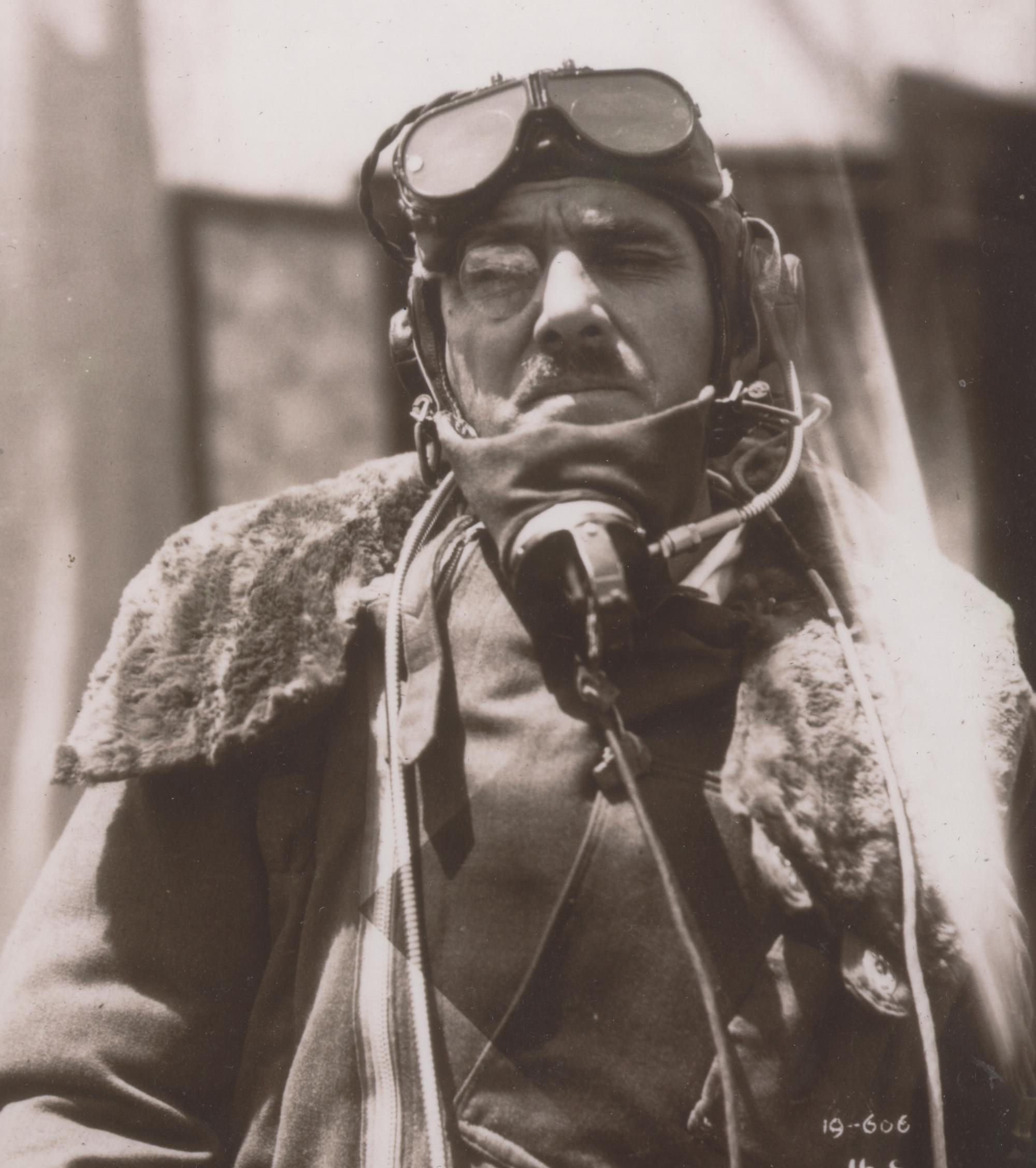
- Stewart Blacker in flying gear 1933
- Born: 18 October 1887; Grappenhall, Cheshire
- Died: 19 April 1964 (aged 76); Petersfield, Hampshire
- Spouse: Lady Doris Peel
- Relatives: Harold Blacker (brother)
- Military career
- Allegiance: United Kingdom
- Branch: British Indian Army; British Army
- Service years: 1907–1942
- Rank: Lieutenant-Colonel
- Awards: OBE

Lieutenant-Colonel Latham Valentine Stewart Blacker OBE (1 October 1887 – 19 April 1964) was a British Army officer and inventor of weapons; he invented the Blacker Bombard, from which was developed the Hedgehog anti-submarine spigot-mortar – and laid the basis of the PIAT anti-tank weapon.

A descendant of Valentine Blacker (1778–1823), he was born in Cheshire to Major Latham Charles Miller Blacker of the Royal Artillery. He was educated at Cheltenham College and Bedford School, before going to the Royal Military College, Sandhurst. After passing out from Sandhurst in 1907, he was commissioned initially on to the Unattached List of the Indian Army and was subsequently admitted.

He served in Afghanistan, Turkestan, and Russia, earning several mentions in dispatches. He served with the 69th Punjabis, Queen's Own Corps of Guides, and 57th Wilde's Rifles.

Blacker had learned to fly in 1911, receiving Certificate No. 121 from the Royal Aero Club, and at the start of the First World War he was attached to the Royal Flying Corps. He was shot down and wounded in 1915, 1916 and 1917. He was appointed Officer of the Order of the British Empire in 1921 for his service in Persia.

After the war he set himself up as a private developer of weapons funding his own research. He served on the Imperial General Staff between 1924 and 1928. He married Lady Doris Peel, the daughter of William Peel, 1st Earl Peel the former Secretary of State for India

After retiring from the Indian Army as a major in 1932, Blacker was commissioned into the 58th (Home Counties) Field Brigade, Royal Artillery (Territorial Army).

In 1933, he was with the Lady Houston-funded expedition to fly over Mount Everest. He organized the event with Colonel Percy T. Etherton and was the chief observer, writing a book First over Everest.

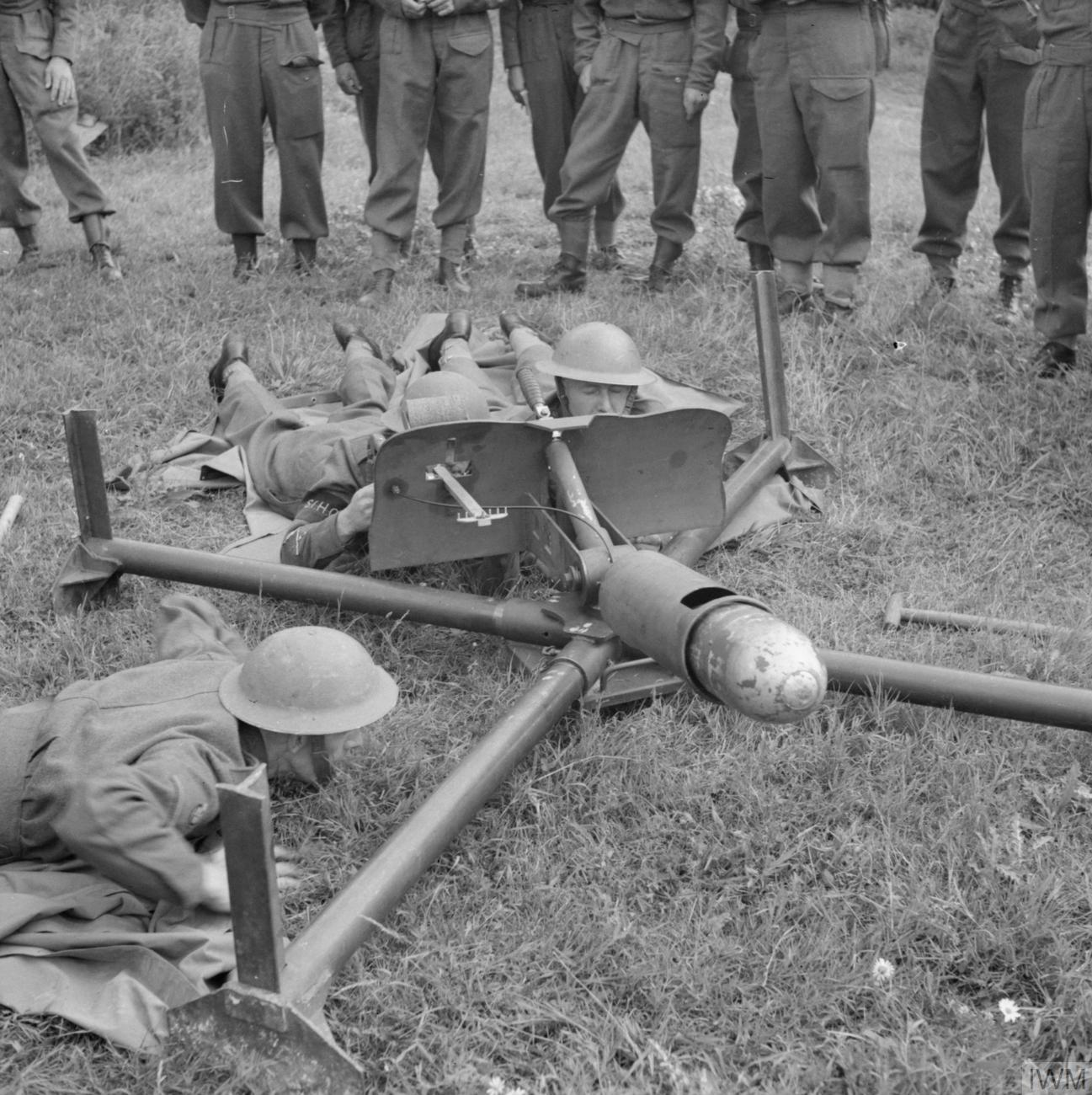
Men of the Saxmundham Home Guard prepare to fire a Blacker Bombard during training with War Office

At the start of the Second World War Blacker was a lieutenant colonel. He took his weapons to his contacts at the War Office and was introduced to Major Millis Jefferis who engaged him and sent him to Coates Castle at Coates, West Sussex, from where his Blacker Bombard, a spigot mortar was developed. It was adopted briefly by the British Army before it was redeployed for use with the Home Guard.

Later one of his experimental guns based on the same principle was developed further by Jefferis and entered service as the PIAT. For his contributions to the Bombard, PIAT, the Hedgehog anti-submarine mortar and Petard demolition mortar (Note: a 290mm high explosive warhead fires from a spigot mortar which was used on the AVRE variant of the Churchill tank) he received £25,000 interim payment and a further £7,000 by the Royal Commission on Awards to Inventors (the body which determined the recompense to inventors whose ideas were used by the government during the war).

In July 1941 Blacker proposed a projectile to be fired by a Ordnance QF 25-pounder consisting of a large warhead with a trailing stick that sat inside the barrel. This was rejected by the Ordnance Board.

Blacker retired from the Territorial Army in October 1942.

== Published works ==
- On Secret Patrol in High Asia. London: John Murray, 1922.
- First over Everest: The Houston – Mount Everest Expedition 1933, Cherry Tree (Withy Grove Press), GB (1938), Fellowes, P. F. M. with L. V. Stewart Blacker and P. T. Etherton and the Marquess of Douglas and Clydesdale.
