= Westland Limousine =

Limousine
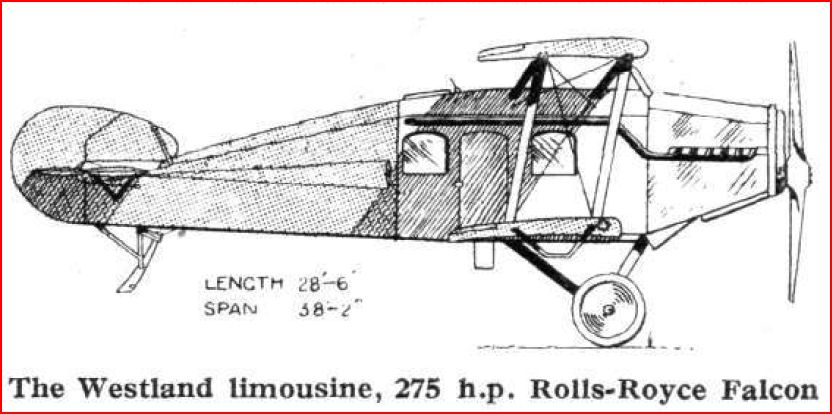
- Lind drawing of the Westland Limousine from Flight, 18 December 1919

General information
- Type: Light Transport Biplane
- Manufacturer: Westland Aircraft
- Designer: R A Bruce, P W Petter
- Number built: 8

History
- Introduction date: 1920
- First flight: July 1919
- Retired: 1925

The Westland Limousine was a 1920s British single-engined four-seat light transport aircraft built by Westland Aircraft.

== History ==
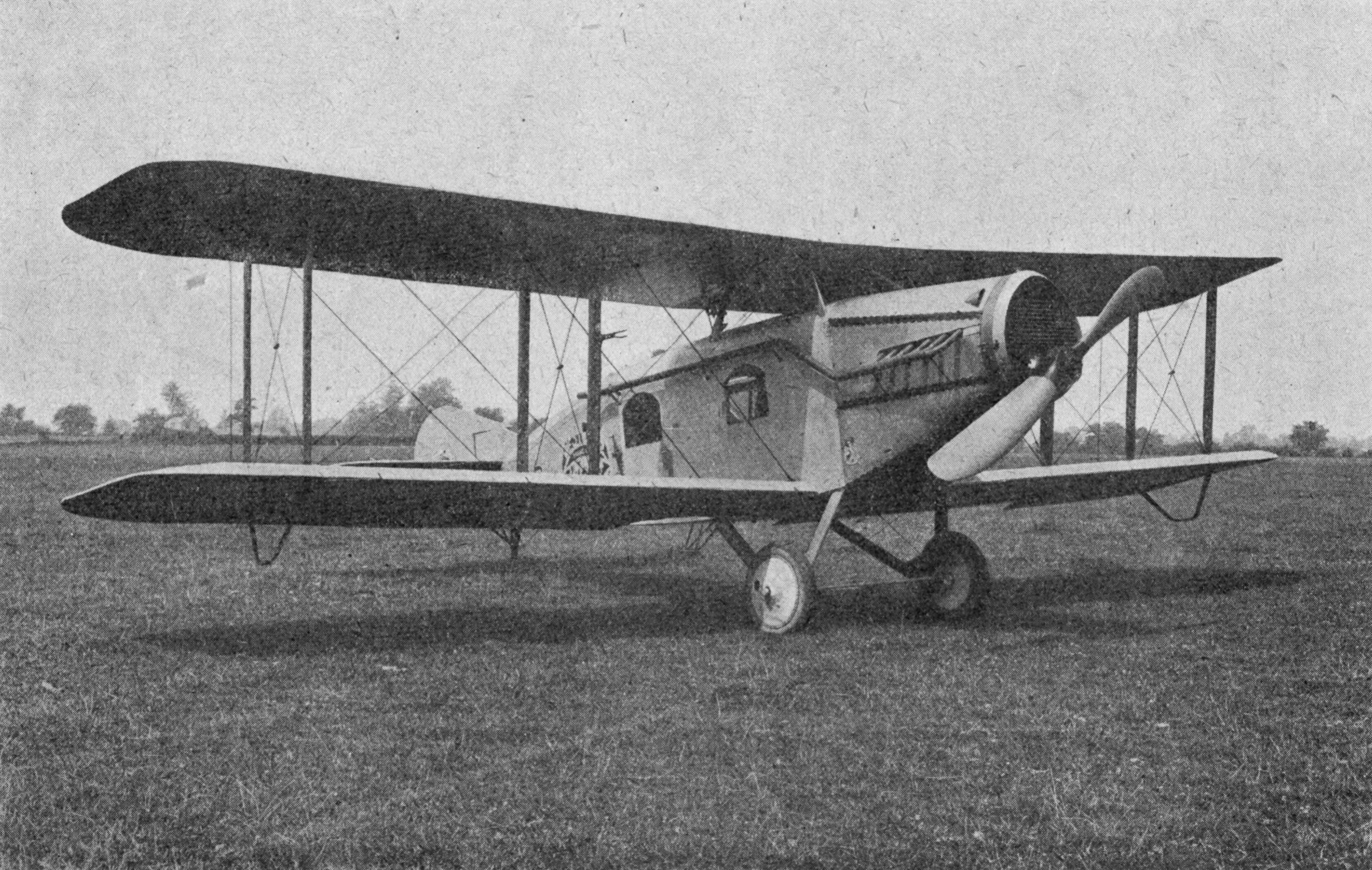
Limousine II

At the end of World War I, the prospect of an expanding aviation market led Westland Aircraft to design a light transport aircraft for three passengers. It was Westland's first commercial aeroplane and designated the Westland Limousine I. The first aircraft (initially registered K-126, but quickly re-registered G-EAFO) flew in July 1919. A biplane, it was powered by one Rolls-Royce Falcon III engine. The passengers were in an enclosed cabin and the pilot sat in the port rear of the four seats. His seat was higher to enable his head to be raised through the cabin roof. The second aircraft (G-EAJL) was designated the Limousine II and was completed in October 1919.

Both the first and second aircraft were used from September 1920 for two months on an experimental express air mail service between Croydon and Le Bourget. A third aircraft was built and was at first test-flown with a new Cosmos Jupiter engine, but later was fitted with the Falcon III. Another four aircraft were built, two of which were used by Instone Air Line to fly from London to Paris and Brussels.

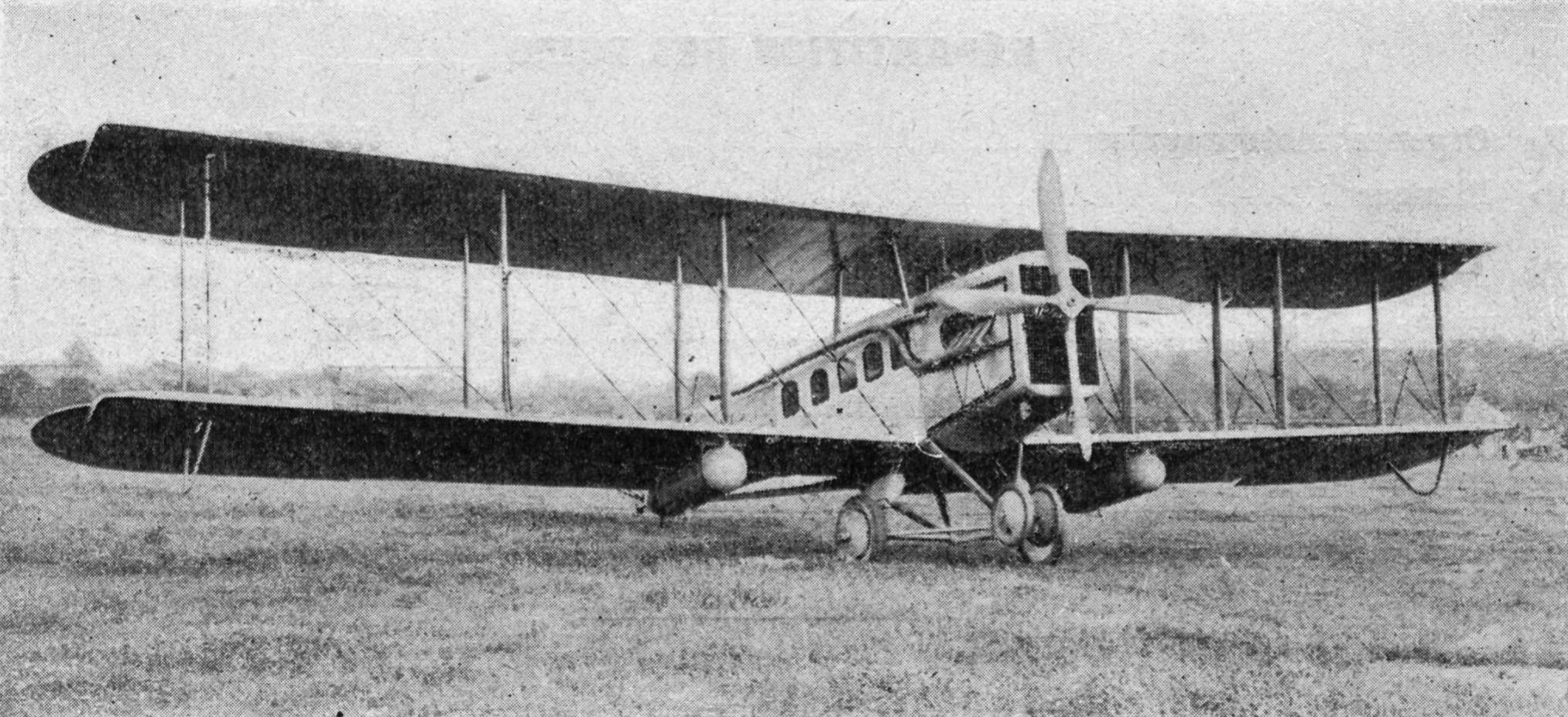
Limousine III

To enter the Air Ministry's 1920 Commercial Aircraft Competition, the aircraft was re-designed as the larger Limousine III for five passengers. It used the 450 hp Napier Lion engine. The aircraft won the £7,500 Air Ministry prize but only one more aircraft was constructed, which was later operated by Instone Air Line.

The first Limousine III (registered G-EARV) pioneered air transport in Newfoundland when it was operated by the Aerial Survey Company (Newfoundland) Ltd. (see Sidney Cotton). It was used for seal and fishery spotting including being used on skis. Two of the earlier Limousine IIs were also to end up in Newfoundland. The company operated in Newfoundland until the end of 1923, carrying mail and passengers to remote outposts.

== Aircraft ==
Limousine I
Prototype Falcon III powered aircraft G-EAFO, destroyed in 1925 in a ground collision with a Fairey Fawn at Netheravon.

Limousine II
Four-seat production aircraft (five built).

Limousine III
Larger five-seat version (two built).

== Specifications (Limousine III) ==
Data from British Civil Aircraft 1919–1972:Volume III

General characteristics

- Crew: 1
- Capacity: 3 or 5 pax
- Length: 33 ft 6 in (10.21 m)
- Wingspan: 54 ft 0 in (16.46 m)
- Height: 12 ft 6 in (3.81 m)
- Wing area: 726 sq ft (67.4 m^{2})
- Empty weight: 3,823 lb (1,734 kg)
- Gross weight: 5,850 lb (2,654 kg)
- Powerplant: 1 × Napier Lion IA W-12 water-cooled piston engine, 450 hp (340 kW)
- Propellers: 4-bladed fixed-pitch wooden propeller, 7 ft 10 in (2.39 m) diameter

Performance

- Maximum speed: 118 mph (190 km/h, 103 kn)
- Cruise speed: 90 mph (140 km/h, 78 kn)
- Range: 520 mi (840 km, 450 nmi)
- Service ceiling: 12,300 ft (3,700 m)
- Rate of climb: 600 ft/min (3.0 m/s) at sea level
