= Westland Wapiti =

British general-purpose military aircraft of the interwar era

Wapiti
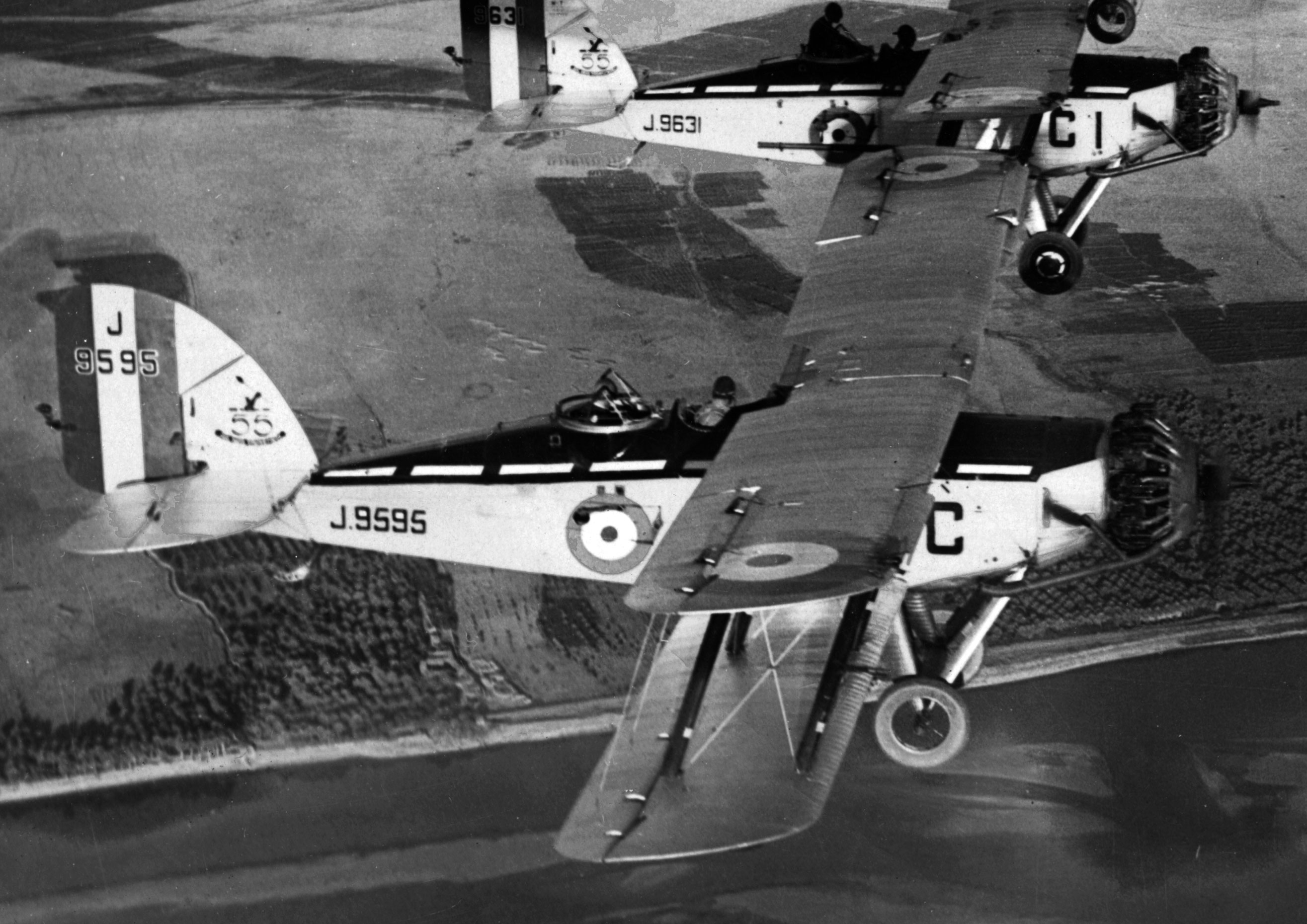
- Wapiti of 55 Squadron RAF

General information
- Type: General purpose
- National origin: United Kingdom
- Manufacturer: Westland Aircraft
- Designer: Arthur Davenport
- Primary users: Royal Air Force Royal Indian Air Force; Royal Canadian Air Force; Royal Australian Air Force
- Number built: 558 + 27 licence built in South Africa

History
- Introduction date: June 1928
- First flight: 7 March 1927
- Variants: Westland Wallace; Westland PV-3

The Westland Wapiti was a British two-seat general-purpose military single-engined biplane of the 1920s. It was designed and built by Westland Aircraft Works to replace the Airco DH.9A in Royal Air Force service.

First flying in 1927, the Wapiti entered service with the RAF in 1928, and remained in production until 1932, a total of 565 being built. It equipped twenty squadrons of the RAF, both overseas (particularly in India and Iraq) and at home, remaining in RAF service until 1940, also being used by the Air Forces of Australia, Canada, South Africa and India. It also formed the basis for the Westland Wallace which partly replaced the Wapiti in RAF use.

The Wapiti is named for the wapiti, also known as elk, one of the largest species of the deer family and one of the largest land mammals in North America and eastern Asia.

== Design and development ==
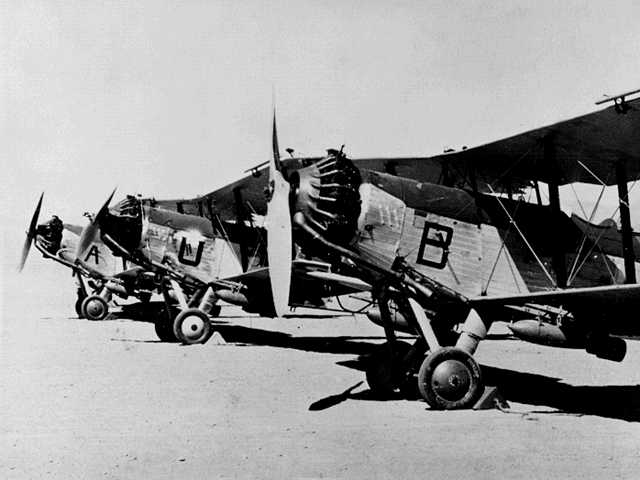

In 1927, the British Air Ministry issued Specification 26/27 for a replacement of the elderly Airco DH.9A, designed during the First World War which still equipped the Royal Air Force's General Purpose squadrons. To save time and money, the specification called for the use of a high proportion of DH.9A components, (as the RAF still held large stores of DH.9A spares), while it encouraged the use of an all-metal structure. A large number of types were tendered to meet this requirement from most of the major British aircraft manufacturers, including Westland, who submitted the design that later became known as the Wapiti. Westland had an advantage in that it had carried out the detailed design work for the DH.9A, and was already a major contractor for the DH.9A.

The Wapiti was a conventional single-engined equal-span two-bay biplane with a slight wing stagger. It had tandem open cockpits and a fixed main undercarriage plus a tailskid. The forward fuselage was of metal tube structure with aluminium-and-fabric covering, while the rear fuselage was of fabric-covered wooden construction. The wings and tail were standard wooden DH.9A components, although later models replaced the wooden parts with an all-metal structure. The Wapiti was powered by a single Bristol Jupiter radial engine, and its crew of two were armed with a forward-firing Vickers machine gun and a Lewis gun for the observer, while it could carry up to 580 lb (264 kg) of bombs under the wings and fuselage. It was also fitted with radio and photographic cameras, and like the DH.9A before it, could carry a spare wheel for operations in adverse terrain.

The prototype first flew on 7 March 1927. Initial tests showed poor control, and the prototype was modified with a much larger tail and horn-balanced ailerons, solving these problems. (It was later discovered that a 2-foot (0.61 m) fuselage section had been omitted from the prototype – as handling was now acceptable, it was not reinstated.) The Wapiti performed well during RAF trials, while using significant amounts of DH.9A components, and was declared the winner of the competition, an initial contract for 25 aircraft being placed in October 1927.

After initial production, the wooden fuselage, tail and wings were replaced by metal structures in the Wapiti II and IIA, and the original long fuselage was eventually reinstated in the Wapiti V and later versions. In 1930, Westland produced an updated version of the Wapiti, the Wapiti VII, which differed so much that it was renamed the Westland Wallace.

== Operational history ==
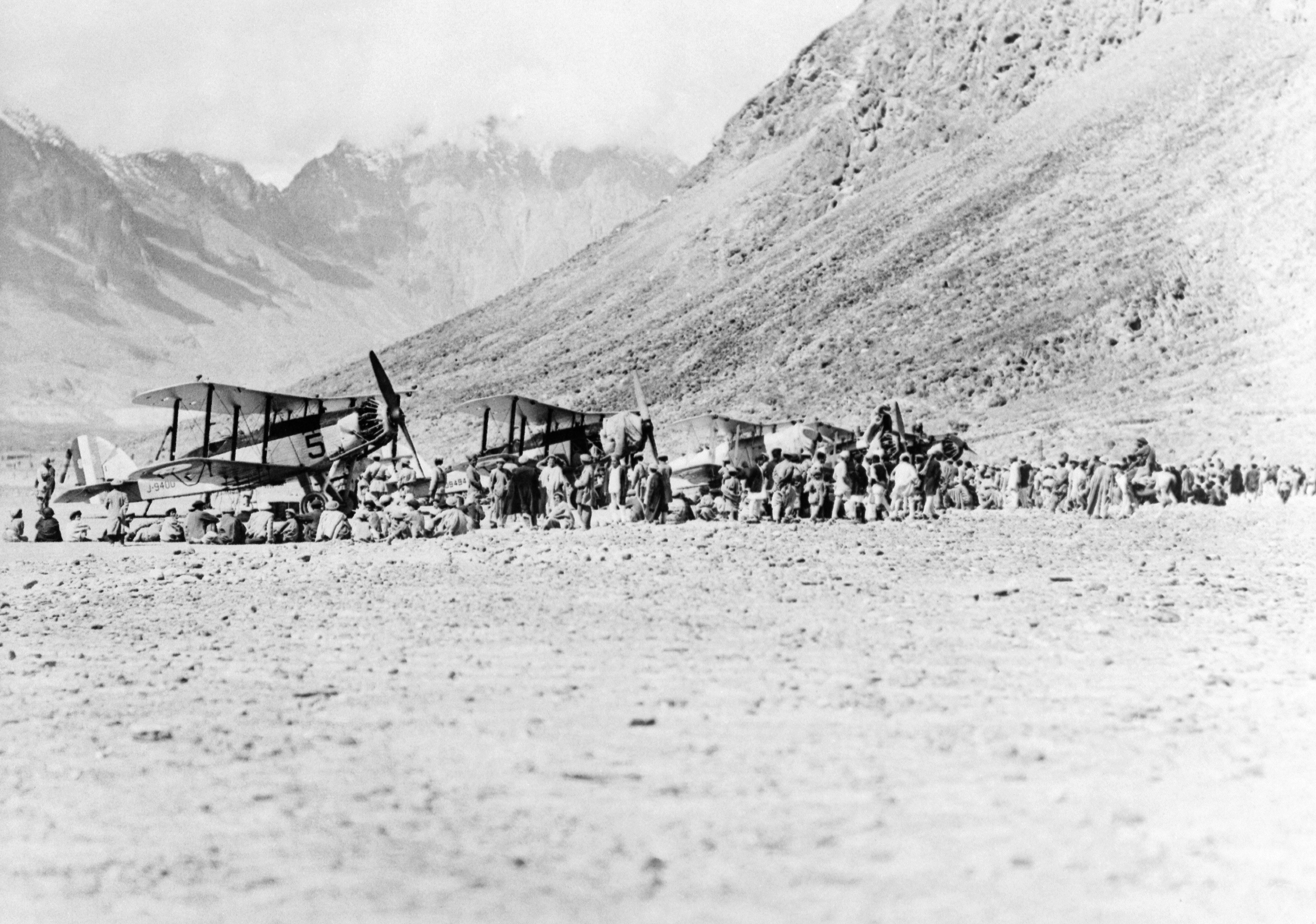
RAF Wapitis in Gilgit, Kashmir around 1930

The type entered service with No. 84 Squadron RAF in Iraq in June 1928. It was heavily used in Iraq and India in the Army Cooperation role, acting also sometimes as a bomber or reconnaissance aircraft. Wapitis of No. 20 squadron escorted Victoria troop carriers in the evacuation of Kabul in December 1928. It was still in service in India until 1942. In Britain, Wapitis served with the Auxiliary Air Force from 1929 to 1937. It was also flown by Australia and Canada, where it saw service at the start of the Second World War.

The prototype Wapiti V, registered G-AAWA, was used for demonstration flights in Argentina and Uruguay on floats, powered by a 550 hp Armstrong Siddeley Panther IIA engine. It was later modified as the Bristol Pegasus-powered Westland PV-6 or Wapiti VII, re-registered G-ACBR (also known as the Houston-Wallace after the patron Lucy, Lady Houston), for an attempt to fly over Mount Everest. Flown by Flt Lt David F. McIntyre and accompanied by a Westland PV-3 the two aircraft became the first to fly over Mount Everest on 3 April 1933. The PV-6 was later designated the Wallace Mk I, bearing serial K3488 which introduced a number of improvements. A total of 68 Wapitis were converted to Wallace Mk I standard.

The Wapiti was used by the Indian Air Force into the early days of the Second World War. During the Imperial Japanese Navy's attack on Ceylon (now Sri Lanka), the Indian Air Force sent two Wapitis of No. 6 Coastal Defence Flight to patrol off the east coast of India, looking for the Japanese fleet. The southern patrolling Wapiti found nothing, but the northern patrolling Wapiti found a Japanese task force including the Japanese aircraft carrier Ryūjō and then survived to land undamaged.

== Military operators ==
Australia

- Royal Australian Air Force – 44 Wapitis were in service from 1929 to 1944.
  - No. 1 Squadron RAAF
  - No. 3 Squadron RAAF
  - No. 1 Flying Training School RAAF
  - Central Flying School RAAF

Canada

- Royal Canadian Air Force
  - No. 3 Squadron RCAF
  - No. 10 Squadron RCAF
  - No. 100 Squadron RCAF
  - No. 118 Squadron RCAF

China

- Chinese Nationalist Air Force

Kingdom of Hejaz

- Hejaz Air Force

India

- Royal Indian Air Force
  - No. 1 Squadron, Indian Air Force
  - No. 2 Squadron, Indian Air Force
  - No. 7 Squadron, Indian Air Force
  - No. 1 Air Gunnery School (India)
  - No. 1 AACU
  - No. 2 AACU
  - No. 3 AACU
  - No.1 Coastal Defence Flight, IAFVR
  - No.2 Coastal Defence Flight, IAFVR
  - No.4 Coastal Defence Flight, IAFVR (Later No. 104 (GR) Squadron, Indian Air Force)
  - No.5 Coastal Defence Flight, IAFVR
  - No.6 Coastal Defence Flight, IAFVR

South Africa

- South African Air Force

United Kingdom

- Royal Air Force

(in India)

  - No. 5 Squadron RAF from 1931 to 1940
  - No. 11 Squadron RAF from 1928 to 1932
  - No. 20 Squadron RAF from 1932 to 1935
  - No. 27 Squadron RAF from 1930 to 1940
  - No. 28 Squadron RAF from 1931 to 1936
  - No. 31 Squadron RAF from 1931 to 1939
  - No. 60 Squadron RAF from 1930 to 1939

(in Iraq)

  - No. 30 Squadron RAF from 1929 to 1935
  - No. 39 Squadron RAF from 1929 to 1931
  - No. 55 Squadron RAF from 1930 to 1937
  - No. 84 Squadron RAF from 1928 to 1935

(in the United Kingdom)

  - No. 24 Squadron RAF from 1924 to 1930 at RAF Northolt
  - No. 501 Squadron RAF from 1930 to 1933 at RAF Filton
  - No. 600 Squadron RAF from 1929 to 1935 at RAF Hendon
  - No. 601 Squadron RAF from 1929 to 1933 at RAF Hendon
  - No. 602 Squadron RAF from 1929 to 1934 at RAF Renfrew then RAF Abbotsinch
  - No. 603 Squadron RAF from 1930 to 1934 at RAF Turnhouse
  - No. 604 Squadron RAF from 1930 to 1934 at RAF Hendon
  - No. 605 Squadron RAF from 1930 to 1934 at RAF Castle Bromwich
  - No. 607 Squadron RAF from 1932 to 1937 at RAF Usworth
  - No. 608 Squadron RAF from 1930 to 1937 at RAF Thornaby

== Variants ==
All built by Westland at Yeovil

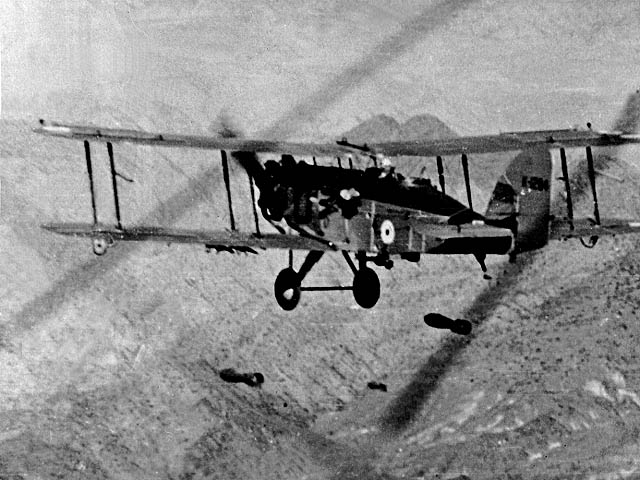

- Wapiti I – Initial production version for the RAF. Wooden structure. Powered by a 420 hp (313 kW) Bristol Jupiter VI radial piston engine. 25 built for RAF.
- Wapiti IA – Improved version for the RAAF. Powered by a 480 hp (358 kW) geared Bristol Jupiter VIIIF radial piston engine and divided-axle main undercarriage. 28 built.
- Wapiti IB – Similar to the Wapiti IA. Four exported to South Africa. Later re-engined with the 525 hp (392 kW) Armstrong Siddeley Panther. Increased fuel.
- Wapiti II – Pre-production version with all-metal rear fuselage and wing structure replacing wooden structures of Wapiti I. Powered by Jupiter VIII engine. 10 built.
- Wapiti IIA – Major production version with tropical equipment and partial dual controls, and able to use wheel or float landing gear. Initially powered by Jupiter VIII. 430 built.
- Wapiti III – Two-seat general-purpose biplane for the SAAF based on Wapiti IIA. Powered by 480 hp (358 kW) Armstrong Siddeley Jaguar VI or 550 hp (410 kW) Panther VI engines. Four built by Westland followed by 27 under licence in SAAF Workshops.
- Wapiti IV – Project for Hispano-Suiza 12N powered aircraft with long fuselage for Spain. One long fuselage aircraft designated Wapiti IV may have been delivered to Chinese Warlord Zhang Xueliang in 1931.
- Wapiti V – Long-fuselage army cooperation version for RAF, fitted with message pick-up hook, stronger undercarriage and powered by a 600 hp (448 kW) Jupiter VIIIF. 35 built.
- Wapiti VI – Unarmed dual control training version for the RAF. 16 built.
- Wapiti VII – Converted Wapiti V prototype, original designated the Houston-Wallace P.V.6 before reconversion to Wapiti VII experimental aircraft.
- Wapiti VIII – Long fuselage version for Central Chinese government. Powered by a Panther IIA, four built.

== Surviving aircraft ==
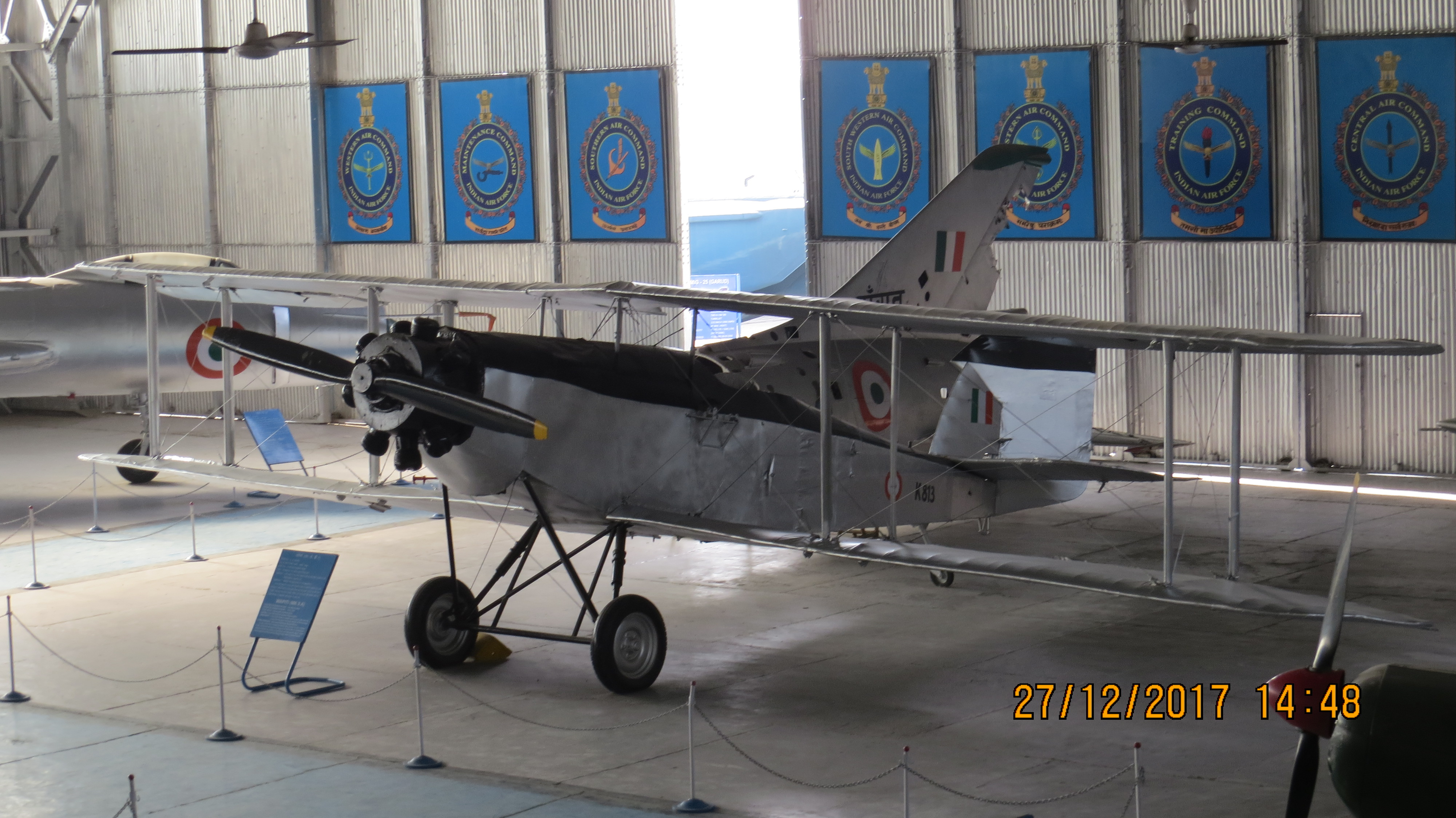
Westland Wapiti K-813 at the Indian Air Force Museum, New Delhi.

A Westland Wapiti (Serial Number K-813) survives at the Indian Air Force Museum, Palam, Delhi, the last surviving aircraft of the type. The fuselage and lower wing of one other (Serial Number K-811) were reported as surviving at the museum warehouse but in June 2012 it was determined that only K-811s lower wing survives, albeit in a ruinous condition.

== Specifications (Wapiti IIA) ==
Data from The British Bomber since 1914

General characteristics

- Crew: 2
- Length: 31 ft 8 in (9.65 m)
- Wingspan: 46 ft 5 in (14.15 m)
- Height: 13 ft (4.0 m)
- Wing area: 488 sq ft (45.3 m^{2})
- Empty weight: 3,810 lb (1,728 kg)
- Gross weight: 5,410 lb (2,454 kg)
- Powerplant: 1 × Bristol Jupiter VI 9-cylinder air-cooled radial piston engine, 420 hp (310 kW)
- Propellers: 2-bladed fixed-pitch propeller

Performance

- Maximum speed: 129 mph (208 km/h, 112 kn)
- Cruise speed: 110 mph (180 km/h, 96 kn)
- Range: 360 mi (580 km, 310 nmi)
- Service ceiling: 18,800 ft (5,700 m)
- Rate of climb: 1,140 ft/min (5.8 m/s)
- Time to altitude: 15 minutes to 10,000 ft (3,000 m)
- Wing loading: 11.1 lb/sq ft (54 kg/m^{2})
- Power/mass: 0.0776 hp/lb (0.1276 kW/kg)

Armament

- Guns: One 0.303 inch (7.7 mm) forward firing Vickers gun and one Lewis gun on Scarff ring on rear cockpit,
- Bombs: Up to 580 lb (260 kg) of bombs.

== See also ==
Related development

- Westland Wallace

Aircraft of comparable role, configuration, and era

- Blackburn Baffin
- Fairey Gordon
- Fairey III
- Hawker Hart
- Vickers Vildebeest
- Westland Wallace
