= Westland Aircraft =

British aircraft manufacturer

- Industry: Aircraft
- Founded: 1915 as Westland Works; 1935 as Westland Aircraft on separation from Petters Ltd
- Defunct: 1961
- Fate: Merged
- Successor: Westland Helicopters
- Headquarters: Yeovil, Somerset, England
- Key people: Arthur Davenport; Harald Penrose; W. E. W. Petter
- Products: Fixed- and rotary-wing aircraft

Westland Aircraft was a British aircraft manufacturer located in Yeovil, Somerset. Formed as a separate company by separation from Petters Limited just before the start of the Second World War, Westland had been building aircraft since 1915. During the war the company produced a number of generally unsuccessful designs, but their Lysander would serve as an important liaison aircraft with the Royal Air Force. After the war the company focused on helicopters, and was merged with several other British firms to create Westland Helicopters in 1961.

== History ==
=== Foundation ===
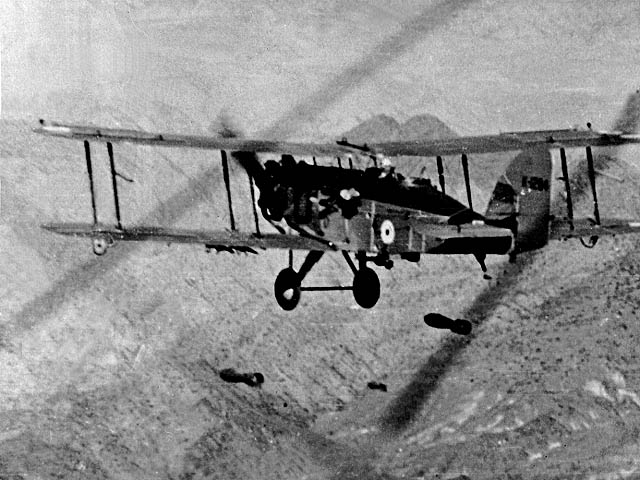
Westland Wapiti

In 1915 the Westland Aircraft Works was founded as a division of Petters in response to government orders for the construction under licence of initially 12 Short Type 184 seaplanes, followed by 20 Short Admiralty Type 166. Orders for other aircraft followed during First World War, including the Sopwith 1½ Strutter, the de Havilland designed Airco DH.4, Airco DH.9 and Airco DH.9A and the Vickers Vimy. The name "Westland" was chosen by Mrs Petter as new land purchased as part of an expansion in 1913 at West Hendford which had been earmarked for a new foundry, but ended up becoming the centre for aircraft production. As a result of the experience gained in manufacturing aircraft under licence, Westland began to design and build its own aircraft, starting with the Westland N.1B in 1917, which was followed in 1918 by the Wagtail and the Weasel.

Following the end of war, Westland produced the Limousine and Woodpigeon light aircraft for the civilian market, but most successful was the Wapiti close support aircraft. In 1935 Petters split its aircraft manufacturing from its aircraft engine concerns to form Westland Aircraft Limited, based in Yeovil, Somerset.

=== World War Two ===
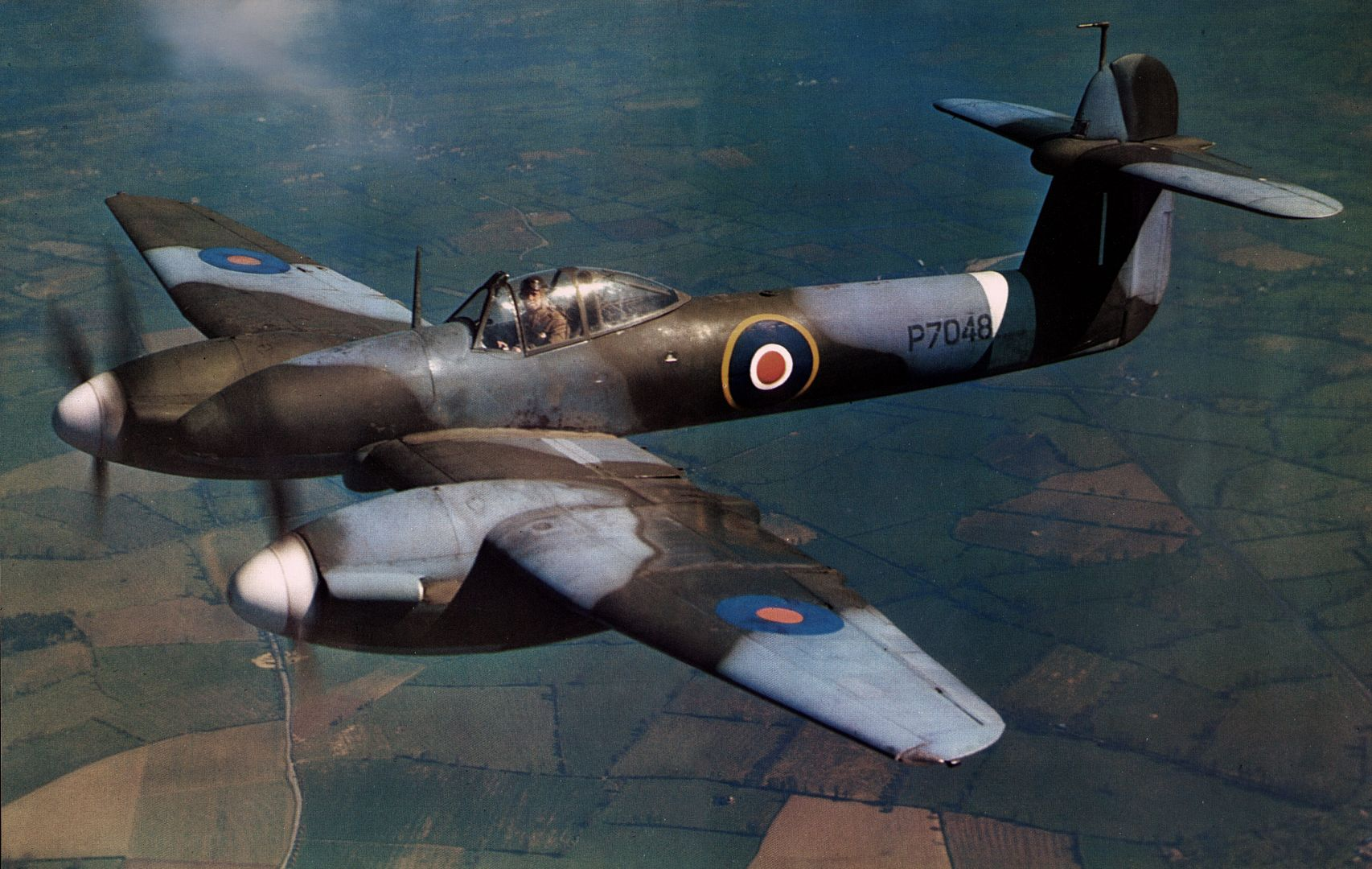
Westland Whirlwind heavy fighter

The Whirlwind was the UK's first cannon-armed fighter and faster than many other British aircraft at the time but was troubled by the inability of Rolls-Royce to produce the engines. The Lysander army co-operation aircraft was displaced for reconnaissance as too vulnerable but found favour for specialist missions into occupied Europe carrying agents. Westland tendered designs for new aircraft during the war but only the Welkin was accepted. The Welkin was a twin-engine high altitude design to intercept attempts by high-flying German bombers to attack Britain. When the threat did not appear production was limited.

For much of the war their factories were used to build Supermarine Spitfires, after the Supermarine factory in Southampton was bombed out of action during the Battle of Britain; indeed Westlands built more Spitfires than any other manufacturer. Westland would then go on to be the major designers of the Supermarine Seafire, a navalised conversion of the Spitfire.

=== Post-war success ===
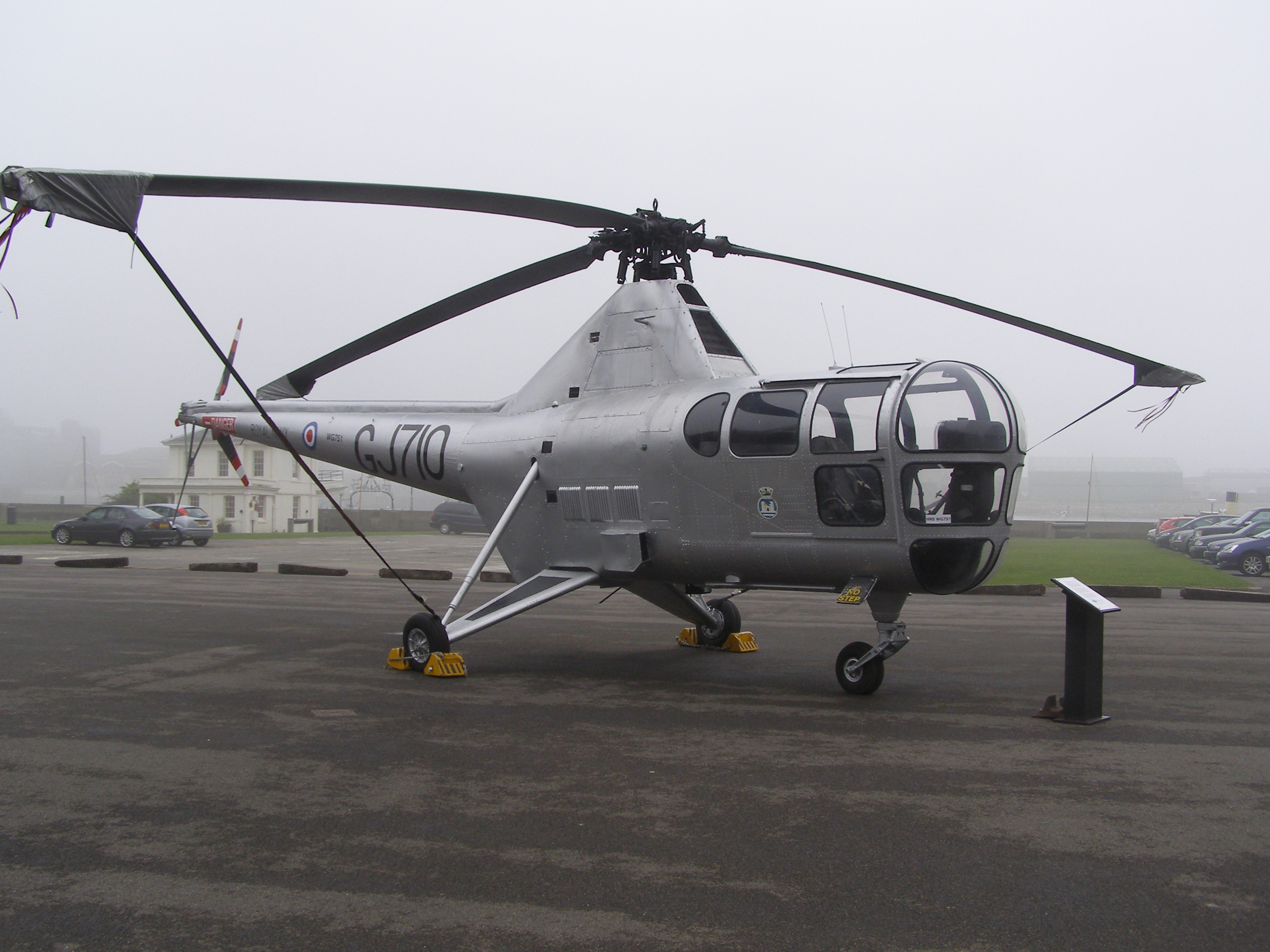
Westland WS-51 Dragonfly

The Westland Wyvern was a post-war design of carrier-based strike-fighter for the Fleet Air Arm serving up to 1958.

Post-war the company decided to get out of fixed-wing aircraft and concentrate solely on helicopters under a licensing agreement with Sikorsky. This upset W.E.W. Petter, the chief designer, who left to form a new aircraft division at English Electric that would go on to be very successful.

Production started with the Sikorsky S-51 flying for the first time in 1948 and as the Westland-Sikorksy Dragonfly entering service with the Royal Navy and RAF from 1950. Westland developed an improved version the Widgeon which was not a great success. Success with the Dragonfly was repeated with the Sikorsky S-55 which became the Whirlwind, and a re-engined Sikorsky S-58 in both turboshaft and turbine engine powered designs as the Wessex.

In 1952 Westland decided on four helicopter designs for possible development:

- The W-80 which was a 24-passenger short range medium lift helicopter with fixed landing gear and similar to the future Westland Commando in appearance.
- The W-81, a high speed, streamlined 32-passenger helicopter, with retractable landing gear and a top speed of 150 miles per hour (240 km/h). Similar to many modern helicopters of today it had twin turbine engines mounted on the fuselage.
- The W-85, a very large helicopter that could lift 15 tons (100 soldiers or their equivalent) in the military version. It was so big that jeeps and medium artillery could be parked side by side internally. Loading and unloading was to be accomplished through a clam shell door on the nose and a retractable ramp in the rear. Power would be from blade tip system, where at the ends of each of the three massive rotor blades was a streamlined pod, with two turbojet engines mounted in each pod.
- The W-90, a colossal 450-seat troopship, with three Sapphire turbojets mounted on its rotor-tips. The W.90 was suggested for development in 1952, with a (200 ft (61 m) rotor diameter).

None of these Westland helicopters advanced further than the paper study. Westland did progress as a private venture, a large space-frame cargo helicopter design using a Sikorksy rotor head - the Westland Westminster - but this was dropped later in favour of the government funded Fairey Rotodyne.

=== Forced mergers ===
From 1959 to 1961 the British government forced the consolidation of 20 or so British aviation firms into three larger groups with the threat of withheld contracts and the lure of project funding. While the majority of fixed-wing aircraft design and construction lay in the British Aircraft Corporation and the Hawker Siddeley Group, the helicopter divisions of Bristol, Fairey and Saunders-Roe (with their hovercraft) were merged with Westland to form Westland Helicopters in 1961.

== Products ==
=== Fixed-wing aircraft ===
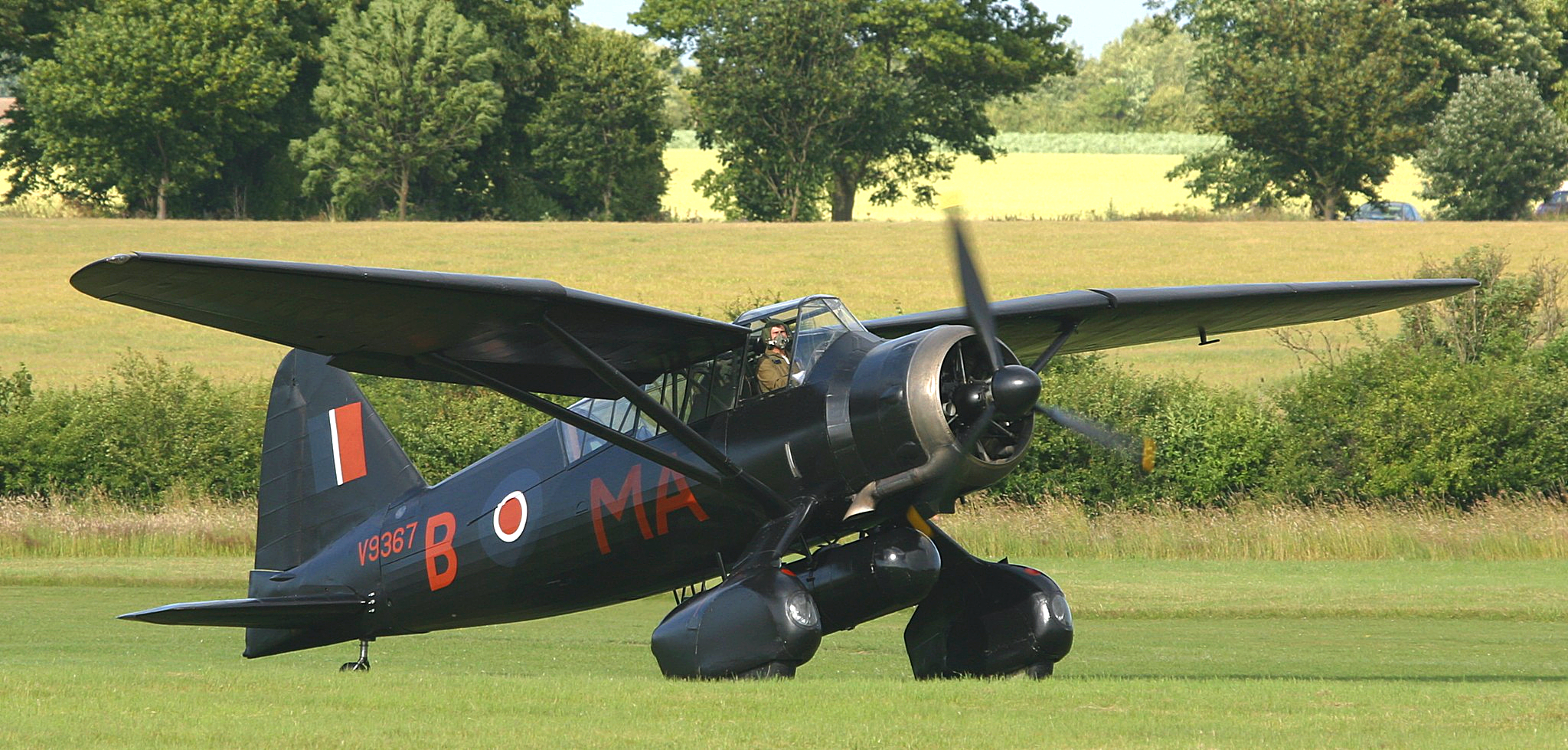
Westland Lysander

- Westland N.1B
- Westland Wagtail
- Westland Weasel
- Westland Limousine
- Westland Walrus
- Westland Dreadnought
- Westland Woodpigeon
- Westland Widgeon
- Westland Yeovil
- Westland Wizard
- Westland Westbury
- Westland Wapiti
- Westland Witch
- Westland-Hill Pterodactyl series of tailless aircraft
- Westland Interceptor
- Westland IV and Wessex
- Westland C.O.W. Gun Fighter
- Westland Wallace
- Westland PV-3 (Houston-Westland)
- Westland PV-6 (Houston-Wallace)
- Westland PV.7
- Westland F.7/30
- Westland Lysander
- Westland Whirlwind
- Westland Welkin
- Westland Wyvern
- Fairey Gannet AEW.3 - Westland Aircraft took over Gannet AEW.3 production in 1960

=== Rotorcraft ===
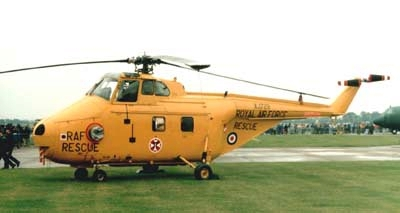
Westland Whirlwind

- Cierva C.29 a joint Cierva / Westland project, built but never flown
- Westland CL.20 a two-seater autogiro built by Westland, the designation "CL" coming from Cierva and George Lepere (of Leo et Oliver). The war prevented further production.
- Fairey Rotodyne - Westland Aircraft took over the Rotodyne project in May 1960
- Westland Dragonfly a license-built version of the American Sikorsky S-51
- Westland Wessex a turbine-powered version of the Sikorsky S-58
- Westland Whirlwind a license-built version of the U.S. Sikorsky S-55/H-19 Chickasaw with British engines.
- Westland Widgeon a private venture by Westland Aircraft as an improvement on the Westland WS-51 Dragonfly
- Westland Westminster (1958) – heavy lift helicopter, private venture to prototype stage only
- Westland Wisp Small remote-controlled helicopter.

=== Others ===
- Westland-Lepere Autogiro
- license holder for hovercraft trademark original held by Saunders-Roe

== Subsidiaries ==
Normalair was created to continue the development and marketing of the pressure relief valves used in the Welkin project.

== See also ==
- Aerospace industry in the United Kingdom
