= Westland Wallace =

General-purpose biplane of the Royal Air Force

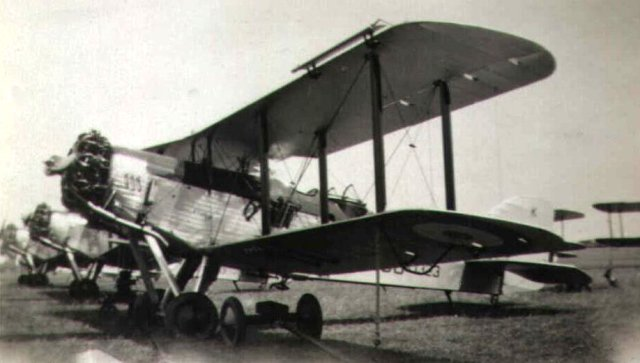

General information
- Type: Two-seat general-purpose biplane
- Manufacturer: Westland
- Primary user: Royal Air Force
- Number built: 104 + 68 conversions from Wapitis

History
- Manufactured: 1933–1936
- Introduction date: 1933
- First flight: 31 October 1931
- Retired: 1943

The Westland Wallace was a British two-seat, general-purpose biplane of the Royal Air Force, developed by Westland as a follow-on to their successful Wapiti. As the last of the interwar general purpose biplanes, it was used by a number of frontline and Auxiliary Air Force Squadrons. Although the pace of aeronautical development caused its rapid replacement in frontline service, its useful life was extended into the Second World War with many being converted into target tugs and wireless trainers. In 1933 a Westland Wallace became the first aircraft to fly over Everest, as part of the Houston-Mount Everest Flight Expedition.

== Design and development ==
In 1931, Westland produced the PV-6, a private-venture development of its successful Wapiti. This updated aircraft embodied a number of improvements including a lengthened fuselage, brakes and wheel spats on the undercarriage and a new engine. By this time both the appearance and performance differed considerably from the standard Wapiti, so the company designated it the "PV6 Wallace." Compared with the earlier Wapiti, the Wallace was 20 inches (0.51 m) longer, incorporated an improved undercarriage and was powered by a 655 hp (488 kW) Bristol Pegasus IV engine. The first batches of MK I Wallaces were conversions of Wapitis, a total of 68 powered by 570 bhp (430 kW) Pegasus IIM3 engines.

Westland designed an improved version, the Mk II which was fitted with a more powerful engine and the novel idea of an enclosed canopy over both crew positions. This offered greater comfort for the crew and improved the rear gunner's aim by protecting him from the slipstream. Three Wallace Is (K4346-K4348) were later converted to Mk II standards, including fitting the closed canopy.

== Operational history ==
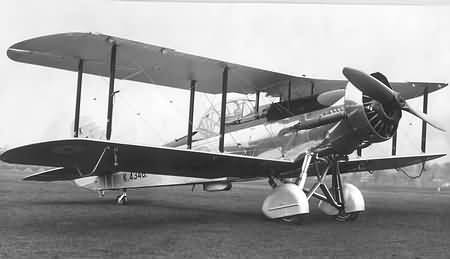
Westland Wallace Mk II

The original PV-6 prototype, registered G-ACBR (and also known as the Houston-Wallace) along with Westland PV-3 G-ACAZ, was part of the Houston Everest Expedition, named after Lucy, Lady Houston the patron, an attempt to fly over Mount Everest. Both aircraft received modifications that included fitting heating and oxygen equipment, fully enclosing the rear cockpits and using highly supercharged Bristol Pegasus IS 3 engines. Flown by Flight Lieutenant D.F. McIntyre and Douglas Douglas-Hamilton, 14th Duke of Hamilton, otherwise known as Lord Clydesdale, the two aircraft became the first to fly over Mount Everest on 3 April 1933.

Most of the Wallaces served with the Auxiliary Air Force: 501, 502, 503 and 504 squadrons beginning with the converted Wapitis early in 1933. Others operated with the Anti-Aircraft Cooperation Flight at RAF Biggin Hill. The last Wallace was completed in October 1936.

The first RAF casualties of WW2 occurred when a Wallace of the RAF Observer School (K6028) crashed at Bennachie, near Aberdeen. Pilot Officer Ellard Alexander Cummings (23) from Ottawa, Canada and Leading Aircraftsman Alexander Ronald Renfrew Stewart (24) were killed.

When withdrawn from the general purpose role, many Wallaces were converted into target tugs. A total of 83 Wallaces remained in service at the beginning of the Second World War. The last were withdrawn in 1943.

== Variants ==
Westland PV-6
Prototype, later converted to military configuration as a Wallace I.
Houston-Wallace
Alternative name for the PV-6 as modified for the Everest expedition.
Wallace Mk I
Conversion from Wapiti powered by a 570 hp (430 kW) Bristol Pegasus IIM3 engine, 68 converted.
Wallace Mk II
New aircraft with glazed cockpit and powered by a 680 hp (510 kW) Bristol Pegasus IV engine, 104 built.

== Operators ==
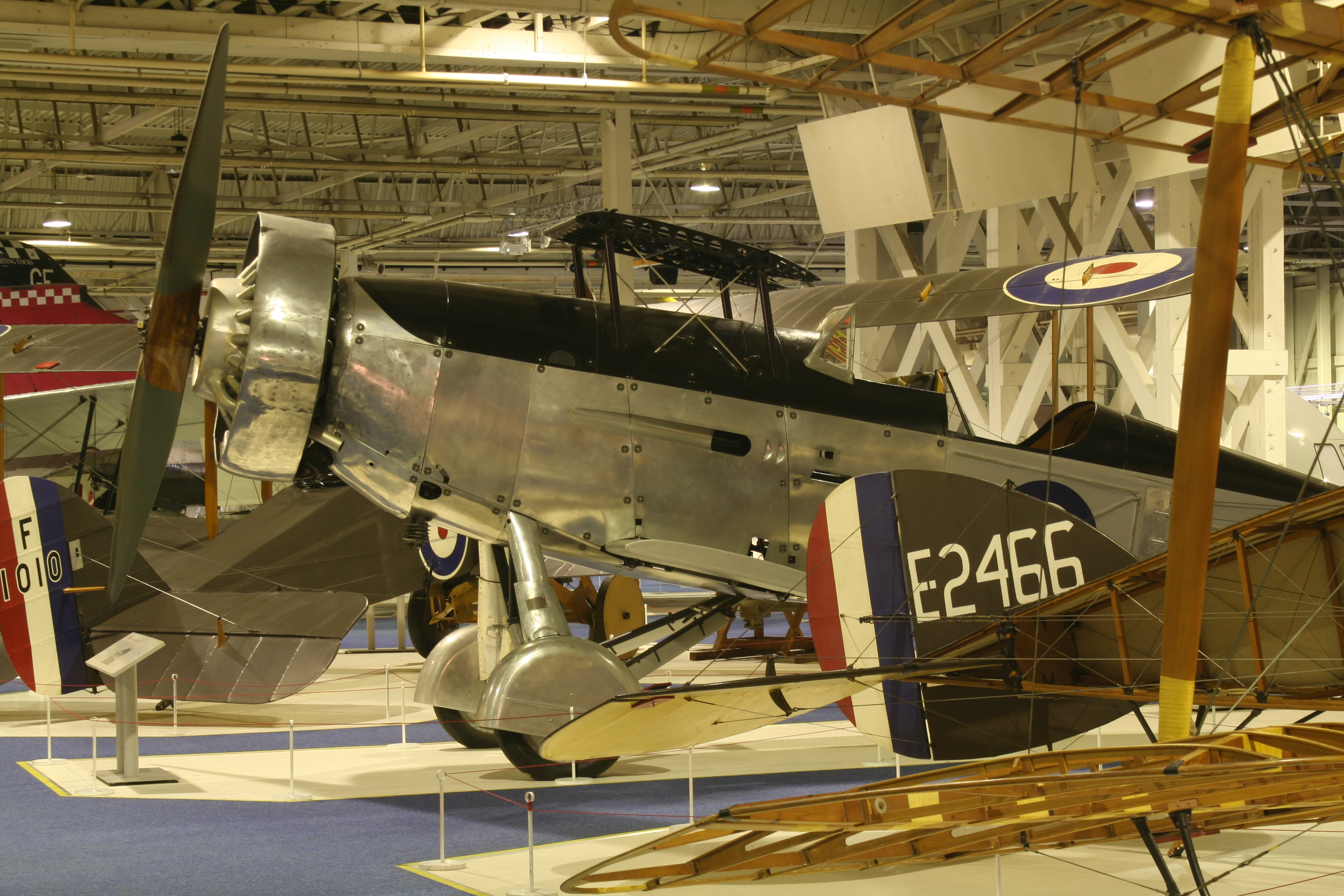
Westland Wallace at RAF Museum, London

United Kingdom

- Royal Air Force
  - No. 501 Squadron RAF - January 1933 to July 1936.
  - No. 502 Squadron RAF - October 1935 to April 1937.
  - No. 503 Squadron RAF - October 1935 to June 1936.
  - No. 504 Squadron RAF - February 1934 to May 1937.

== Specifications (Westland Wallace II) ==
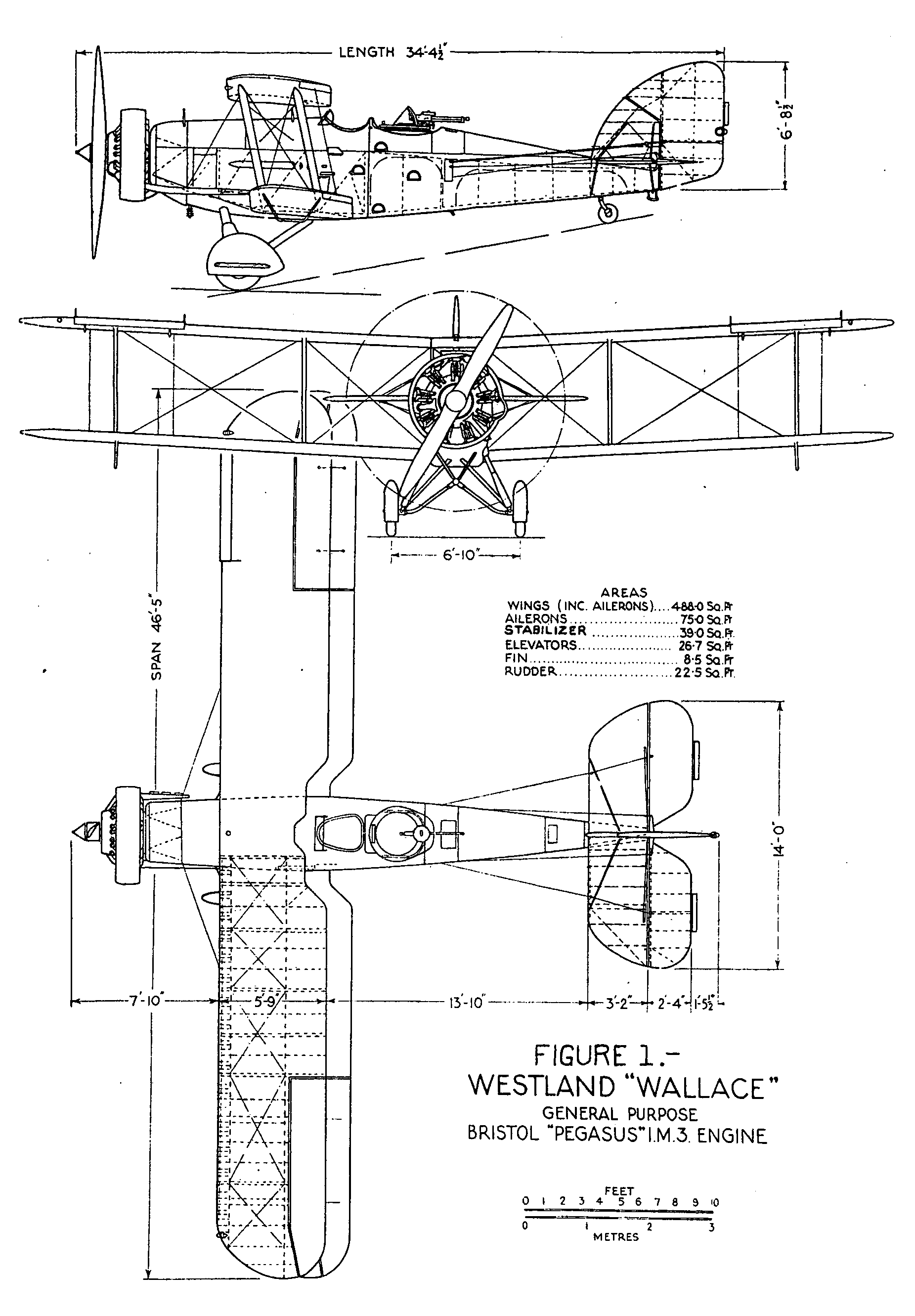
Westland Wallace 3-view drawing from NACA-AC-179

Data from The Hamlyn Concise Guide to British Aircraft of World War II

General characteristics

- Crew: 2
- Length: 34 ft 2 in (10.41 m)
- Wingspan: 46 ft 5 in (14.15 m)
- Height: 11 ft 6 in (3.51 m)
- Wing area: 488 sq ft (45.3 m^{2})
- Empty weight: 3,840 lb (1,742 kg)
- Max takeoff weight: 5,750 lb (2,608 kg)
- Powerplant: 1 × Bristol Pegasus IV 9-cylinder air-cooled radial piston engine, 680 hp (510 kW)
- Propellers: 2-bladed fixed-pitch propeller

Performance

- Maximum speed: 158 mph (254 km/h, 137 kn) at 15,000 ft (4,572 m)
- Cruise speed: 135 mph (217 km/h, 117 kn)
- Range: 470 mi (760 km, 410 nmi)
- Service ceiling: 24,100 ft (7,300 m)

Armament

- Guns: 2 × 0.303 in (7.7 mm) machine-guns
- Bombs: total of 580 lb (260 kg) of bombs

== See also ==
Aircraft of comparable role, configuration, and era

- Hawker Hardy
- Vickers Vincent
- Westland Wapiti

Related lists

- list of aircraft of the Royal Air Force
