= Cierva C.29 =

C.29

General information
- Type: Five-seat cabin autogyro
- National origin: United Kingdom
- Manufacturer: Cierva
- Number built: 1

History
- Manufactured: 1934

The Cierva C.29 was a five-seat British cabin autogyro built in 1934 as a joint venture between Westland Aircraft and Cierva. The rotor system and rotors were designed by Cierva and the fuselage by Westland. It was powered by a 600 hp (447 kW) Armstrong Siddeley Panther II engine with a two-bladed tractor propeller; the engine also drove the three-bladed rotor via a clutched shaft. The C.29 suffered from ground resonance during ground running and was not flown. It was later acquired for evaluation by the Royal Aircraft Establishment but it was unable to cure the resonance problem and the autogyro was scrapped in 1939.

== Specifications ==
Data from Aircraft Data Sheet: Cierva C-29 (1934)]

General characteristics

- Crew: 1
- Capacity: 4
- Length: 38 ft 0 in (11.58 m)
- Height: 12 ft 9 in (3.89 m)
- Empty weight: 3,221 lb (1,461 kg)
- Gross weight: 5,000 lb (2,268 kg)
- Powerplant: 1 × Armstrong Siddeley Panther II 14 cylinder air-cooled radial piston engine, 600 hp (450 kW)
- Main rotor diameter: 50 ft 0 in (15.24 m)

Performance

- Maximum speed: 160 mph (257 km/h, 139 kn)
