= Lucy, Lady Houston =

British philanthropist and activist (1857–1936)

Dame Lucy Houston DBE
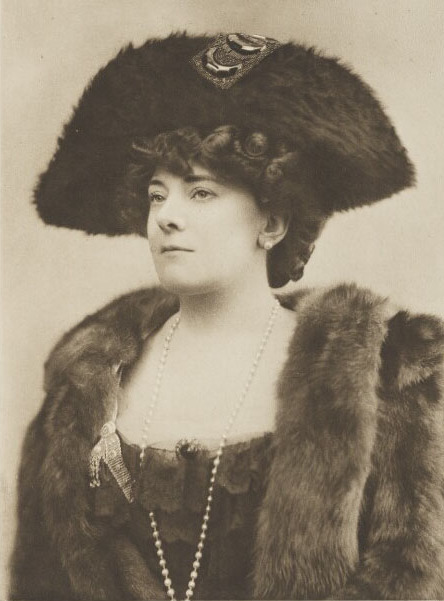
- Born: Fanny Lucy Radmall; 8 April 1857; Lambeth, London, England
- Died: 29 December 1936 (aged 79); Highgate, London, England
- Other name: Poppy Radmall
- Known for: Aviation pioneer, newspaper publisher
- Spouses: Theodore Francis Brinckman (m. 1883; div. 1895); George Byron, 9th Baron Byron (m. 1901; died 1917); Sir Robert Houston, 1st Baronet (m. 1924; died 1926)

Dame Fanny Lucy Houston, Lady Houston DBE (née Radmall; 8 April 1857 – 29 December 1936) was a British philanthropist, suffragist and, subsequently, right-wing political activist.

Beginning in 1933, she published the Saturday Review, which made frequent attacks on the National Governments of Ramsay MacDonald and Stanley Baldwin, labelled by the Review as "unpatriotic". She has been acknowledged as an aviation pioneer and "the saviour of the Spitfire" because of her support for its predecessor, the Supermarine seaplane.

== Early life ==
Fanny Lucy Radmall was the fourth daughter of Thomas Radmall, a woollen warehouseman and draper, and Maria Isabella Clark. She was born at 13 Lower Kennington Green, Lambeth, the ninth child of ten children. This Surrey suburb was across the Thames from the city, but now forms part of Inner London. As a young woman, she was a professional dancer, a chorus girl known as "Poppy".

At the age of sixteen, she took up with a wealthy man twice her age, Frederick "Freddy" Gretton, whose family were co-owners of the Bass Brewery. She was his mistress for ten years. Gretton was a keen supporter of the turf and owner of celebrated racehorses (such as Isonomy, winning the Stayers' Triple Crown). Gretton died in 1882 and left her a legacy of £6,000 per year, a large sum (equivalent to £834,000 in 2024).

== Marriages to Brinckman and Byron ==
Lucy Radmall wanted a stage career, and secured a part from Augustus Harris, playing an American heiress. Three weeks into her first stage role, however, at the Theatre Royal, Drury Lane, in Lady Clare by Robert Williams Buchanan under the stage name Lucy Grafton, she eloped with Theodore Francis Brinckman, son of Sir Theodore Brinckman, 2nd Baronet. On 3 September 1883 they married but the relationship did not flourish and the couple divorced on 14 January 1895 after a long separation. After a dramatic proposal on her part, she remarried on 1 March 1901, to the retiring and previously confirmed bachelor, George Byron, 9th Baron Byron. As Lady Byron, she became a suffragist, joining the Women's Social and Political Union in 1908. She stood bail for Emmeline Pankhurst.

During the First World War she strongly supported the war effort, for example by sending matches to soldiers serving overseas, the boxes labelled 'A Match for Our Matchless Troops from Lady Byron', and her 'Give Him Socks' campaign. Byron died on 30 March 1917. Later that year Lucy was appointed Dame Commander of the Order of the British Empire (DBE) for her creation of the Bluebirds' Nest, a rest home on Hampstead Heath for nurses serving on the Western Front.

== Marriage to Sir Robert Houston ==
Her third and final marriage was to Sir Robert Houston, 1st Baronet, Member of Parliament for West Toxteth, and a shipping magnate. Houston is described in the Oxford Dictionary of National Biography as "a hard, ruthless, unpleasant bachelor." Nevertheless, Lucy Byron chased him for seven years, seeing off his old friend F. E. Smith, who opposed the marriage. Lucy got her way and finally they married on 12 December 1924.

Houston established residence at Beaufield House, Saint Saviour, Jersey for the purposes of tax avoidance, and the couple divided their time between England, Jersey, and Houston's luxurious yacht, SY Liberty. When Sir Robert showed her his will, Lady Houston reportedly tore it up, telling him that £1,000,000 (equivalent to £70 million in 2024) was insufficient. By the time of their marriage Sir Robert was an invalid who suffered from bouts of depression and believed that he was being poisoned. He died aboard Liberty on 14 April 1926, leaving his widow roughly £5.5 million (equivalent to £382 million in 2024).

Lady Houston was now England's second richest woman. Although not liable to pay death duties on Houston's estate she negotiated personally with Winston Churchill, then Chancellor of the Exchequer, to pay £1.6 million (equivalent to £111 million in 2024) without admitting liability.

Returning to London in 1928, Lady Houston began to support Boswell Printing and Publishing Co. of Essex Street, a right-wing publisher. They put out, anonymously, her Potted Biographies of left-wing figures.

== Schneider Trophy ==
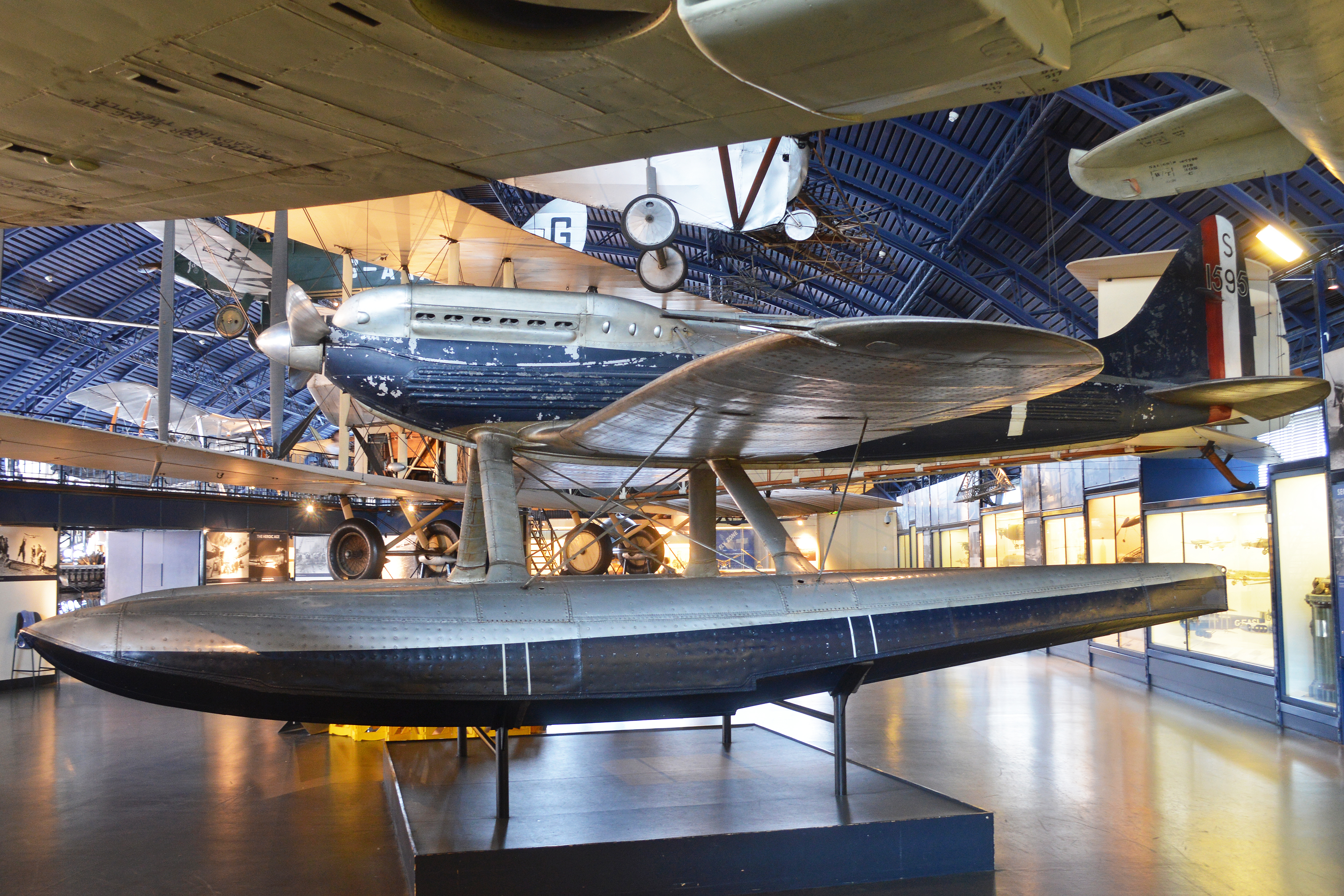
Supermarine S.6B, winner of the 1931 Schneider Trophy

Lady Houston gave generously to British aviation. In 1931, she donated £100,000 (equivalent to £7 million in 2024) to Supermarine, allowing them to win the Schneider Trophy in that year. The Royal Air Force's entry for the 1931 race for the trophy was hindered by political opposition. On 15 January 1931, the Air Ministry refused a last-minute request by the Royal Aero Club for funds for an entry. With the economic crisis the Cabinet vetoed RAF involvement and Government funding in a sporting event. Marshal of the Royal Air Force, Sir Hugh Trenchard held the view that there was no advantage as aircraft development would continue whether or not the UK competed. The Ministry forbade the use of the aircraft that competed in the 1929 race; forbade RAF pilots of the High Speed Flight who were trained to fly these seaplanes, to take part; and said that it would not police the race course in 1931 in the busy shipping lanes in the Solent. The Royal Aero Club sent a statement to the Cabinet on 22 January 1931, offering to raise £100,000, if the Government would rescind the Air Ministry's decrees on planes, pilots and policing.

Many newspapers backing the opposition Conservative Party wanted to put pressure on Ramsay MacDonald's Labour government. One newspaper sent a telegram to MacDonald stating that, "To prevent the socialist government from being spoilsports, Lady Houston will be responsible for all extra expenses beyond what Sir Philip Sassoon (President of the Royal Aero Club) says can be found, so that Great Britain can take part in the race for the Schneider trophy." The gift gave Lady Houston an opportunity to attack the Labour government, with the declaration "Every true Briton would rather sell his last shirt than admit that England could not afford to defend herself."

== Later life ==
In 1932, she offered to give £200,000 (equivalent to £16 million in 2024) to strengthen the British Armed Forces. The National Government refused. She hung a huge electric sign, "DOWN WITH MACDONALD THE TRAITOR", in the rigging of Liberty and sailed round Great Britain. In a telegram to MacDonald, she wrote:

I alone have dared to point out the dire need for air defence of London. You have muzzled others who have deplored this shameful neglect. You have treated my patriotic gesture with a contempt such as no other government would have been guilty of toward a patriot.

She funded disruptive campaigns against the National Government at nine by-elections in 1933.

In 1933, Lady Houston financed the Houston–Mount Everest flight expedition, in which aircraft flew over the summit of Mount Everest for the first time. This was to show opposition to granting independence to India. She gave money to the India Defence League, founded that year, of which John Gretton became treasurer.

In October 1934 Lady Houston sent a cable to the winners of the MacRobertson Air Race, Tom Campbell Black and C. W. A. Scott; "Your achievement has thrilled me through, oh brave men of my heart... If this does not make the Government sit up, nothing will ... Sleep well and feel proud of yourselves, as we all are ... Rule Britannia. God bless you both."

Following her purchase of the Saturday Review in 1933 at the age of 76, she threw herself in a frenzy of activity as a newspaper proprietor determined to alert Britain to the weakness of its political leaders and the dangers of Communist infiltration of Britain. Frustrated by what she saw as the weakness of Ramsay MacDonald and then Stanley Baldwin as Prime Ministers she tried to push Lloyd George, Winston Churchill, and ultimately from 1935 the new king, her friend Edward VIII, into the role of virtual dictator of the country. At the 1935 Norwood by-election she supported an Independent Conservative candidate against Duncan Sandys. The candidate Richard Findlay, who lost his deposit, had joined the British Union of Fascists some weeks before the election, and expressed strong anti-Semitic views at a meeting of The Link in 1939.

In that she believed that Benito Mussolini and Adolf Hitler were strong leaders who pulled their countries, Italy and Germany, round from a state of decay, she wanted a strong British leader to emulate them. She admired the stance of both Hitler and Mussolini against Soviet Russia, believing that its political ambitions presented the greatest threat to the power of Britain and its Empire.

She also considered funding Oswald Mosley and his British Union of Fascists with the £200,000 rejected by the Government; however, Mosley's publication, The Blackshirt, printed what she thought were insulting references to her and so she kept the money.

== Death ==
By the time of the abdication of Edward VIII in early December 1936, she was a semi-invalid who spent most of her time in bed, from where she edited and ran the Saturday Review. However, she was so distraught by the abdication, which she believed was the result of sinister forces coming from Moscow, that she stopped eating and died of a heart attack on 29 December 1936, aged 79, at her home, Byron Cottage, Highgate. She had no children and left no will.

== In popular culture ==
Lady Houston is depicted in the 1942 film The First of the Few, directed by Leslie Howard, showing her support for the development of British aircraft and her anti-government views. She is portrayed by actress Toni Edgar-Bruce.
