= Handley Page H.P.42 =

Biplane airliners

HP.42 / HP.45
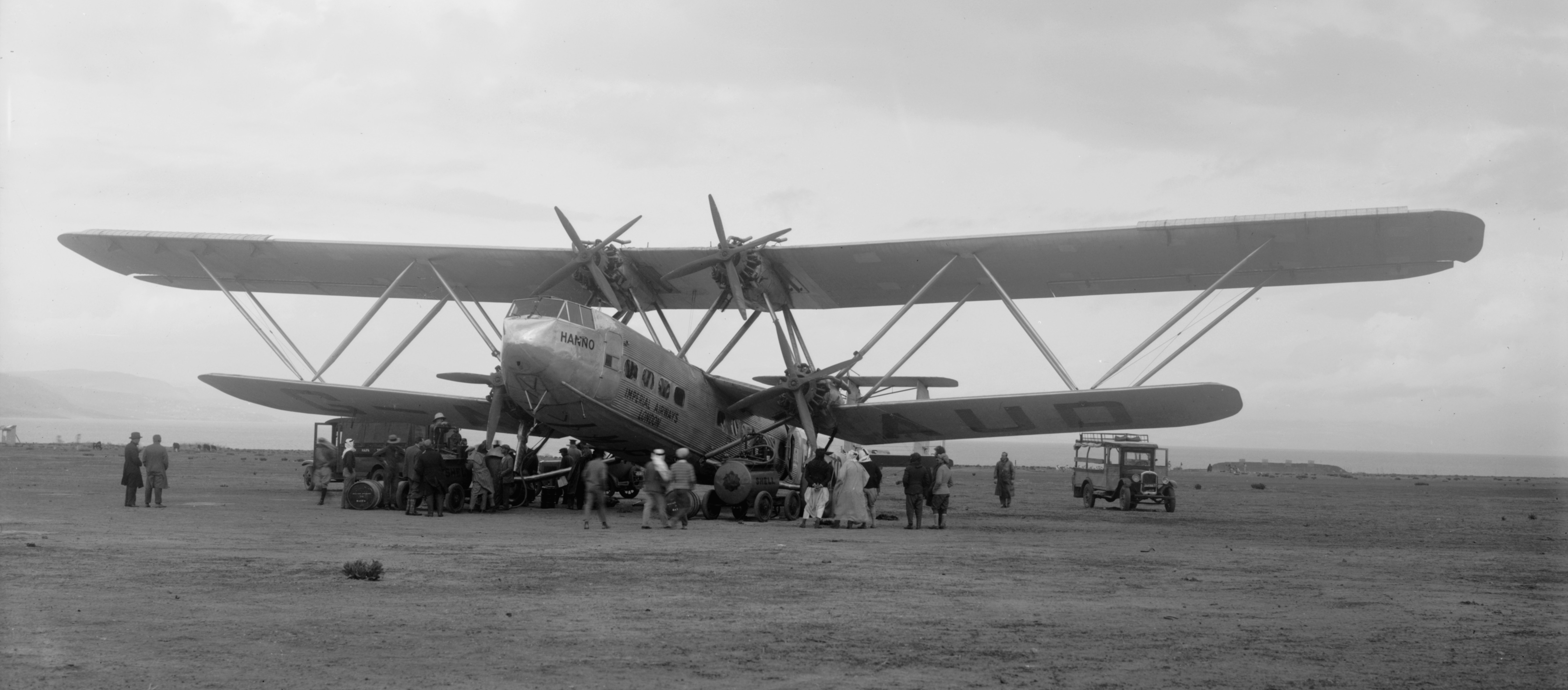
- Handley Page H.P.42 G-AAUD Hanno

General information
- Type: Civilian airliner
- Manufacturer: Handley Page
- Designer: George Volkert and Harold Boultbee
- Primary users: Imperial Airways Royal Air Force
- Number built: 4 HP.42, 4 HP.45

History
- Introduction date: June 1931
- First flight: 14 November 1930
- Retired: 1940 (all lost)

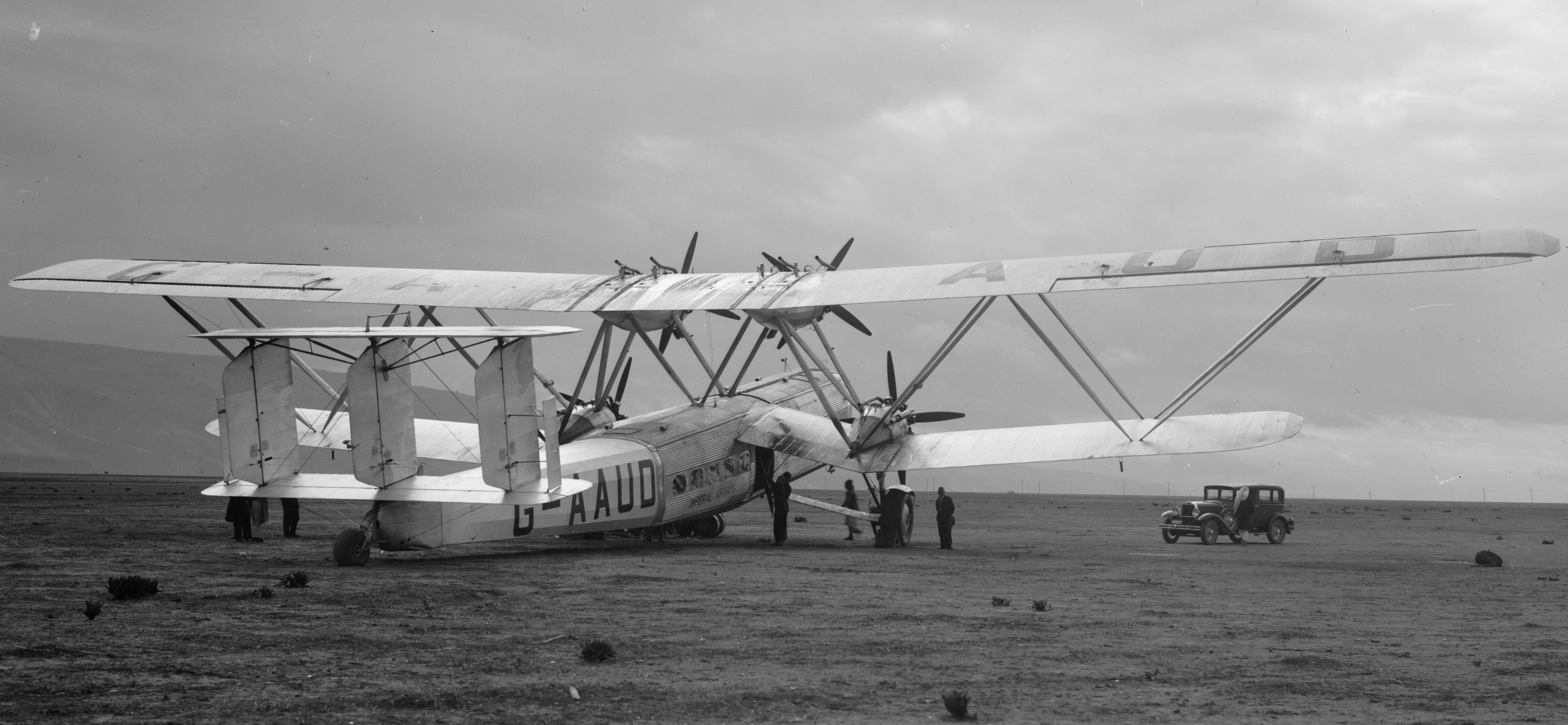
Hanno ready for takeoff

The Handley Page H.P.42 and H.P.45 were four-engine biplane airliners designed and manufactured by British aviation company Handley Page, based in Radlett, Hertfordshire. They held the distinction of being the largest airliners in regular use in the world on the type's introduction in 1931.

The H.P.42/45 were designed in response to a specification issued during 1928 by the British flag airline Imperial Airways. The two models are very similar, with the H.P.42 optimised for range at the expense of payload while the H.P.45 carried more passengers over shorter distances. Imperial Airways approved Handley Page's proposals and ordered four aircraft of each variant to serve as the new land-based long-distance flagships of its fleet.

On 14 November 1930, the prototype, named Hannibal, made its first flight. Following their introduction into Imperial Airways service, they formed the backbone of the airliner's land-based fleet through most of the 1930s, along with the company's numerous flying boats. Eight aircraft were built, four of each type, and all had names beginning with the letter "H". Three survivors were pressed into Royal Air Force (RAF) service at the outbreak of the Second World War. By the end of 1940, all of the aircraft had been destroyed.

== Development ==
Handley Page H.P.42

In 1928, Imperial Airways invited submissions from the British aviation industry for a replacement of its de Havilland Hercules and Armstrong Whitworth Argosy landplane airliners for use on its major long distance routes across the Empire.

The tender was split into four requirements of three and four engine aircraft for the European routes, and three and four engine aircraft for the Eastern routes. Quotes were expected for batches of three, four, five and six aircraft. Imperial Airways preferred air-cooled engines while the engines chosen would be provided by Imperial Airways as would the electrical and wireless equipment. Payments would be made progressively throughout production with the final third of the price kept until after delivery and acceptance.

Imperial specified that the aircraft's stall speed would not exceed 52 mph (84 km/h), and it was to be able to fly hands-off and be able to maintain altitude with one engine out, for a given range. They also specified that the average passenger would be assumed to weigh 165 lb (75 kg).

Imperial Airways offered bonuses for exceeding the specifications and penalties for under performance and late delivery. Aircraft were to be delivered from September 1930 to the end of the year (Eastern type) and December 1930 to end of March 1931 (Western type).

British aircraft manufacturer Handley Page, who had an established reputation for large airliners, submitted tenders to meet all four of the requirements.

Handley Page built two very similar aircraft, designated H.P.42 and H.P.45, to meet the different requirements. The H.P.42 was for Imperial Airways' long-range Eastern routes, while the H.P.45 was configured for shorter routes across Europe. Imperial Airways ordered four of each. Imperial Airways commonly referred to the H.P.42 as the H.P.42E (E for "Eastern" routes – India and South Africa), while the H.P.45 was referred to as the H.P.42W (W for "Western" i.e. European routes).

The design was drawn up by George Volkert and Harold Boultbee.

== Design ==
The Handley Page H.P.42 was a large unequal-span sesquiplane. It incorporated numerous original features throughout its design. It had an all-metal frame with fabric covering on the wings, tail surfaces and rear fuselage. The fuselage comprises two sections, the unusually long forward section built up around massive riveted girders and partly skinned with corrugated metal, while the rear was built around welded steel tubes and skinned with fabric. Their construction was noted as being relatively expensive.

The wings were braced by a Warren truss to simplify rigging, which had already been tested on Boultbee's Handley Page Hare. The engines were placed as close to each other as the propeller diameter would allow to reduce any yaw from an engine being shut down. Automatic slots were fitted to the top wing, which benefited from a new construction approach involving single z-section spars and planking, of duralumin. Slot-type ailerons are also used, each with four hinges and supported by four box-section brackets and both statically and aerodynamically balanced, making for relatively light control forces. Inboard of the lower engines, the lower wings were inclined upwards so the spar would pass above the cabin rather than through it. Both the elevators and ailerons were controlled via a large diameter Y-tube with the core controls being duplicated. The biplane tailplane was furnished with three separate fins.

The H.P.42 was powered by four 490 hp (370 kW) Bristol Jupiter XIFs, while the H.P.45 variant used four 555 hp (414 kW) Jupiter XFBM supercharged engines. Both models had their engines in the same positions with two engines on the upper wing and one on each side of the fuselage on the lower wing. While not common, it was not an original innovation, having been previously used on some of Blériot's aircraft. The upper engines were placed as close together as permissible by the diameter of their propellers and were mounted on rigid duralumin plates attached to the rear wing spar with welded steel tubing. Fuel tanks were in the upper wing and were gravity-fed. The throttles for the engine included a "lost motion" mechanism which used the first movement from the stop to turn on the fuel cocks.

The fully enclosed crew compartment was located at the nose of the aircraft. There were two passenger cabins, one forward of the wings and the other aft. The H.P.42E carried six (later increased to 12) in the forward compartment and twelve in the aft. There was also substantial space allocated for baggage. The H.P.42W variant seated 18 passengers forward and 20 aft, at the cost of a baggage capacity. The cabins featured a high degree of luxury, having been intentionally styled to resemble Pullman railway carriages. Other features aimed at improving passenger comfort including spacious cabins, wide windows, and full onboard services. Initially, as was typical for the period, there were no seatbelts until an unrelated air accident motivated Imperial Airways to install them.

== Operational history ==
On 14 November 1930, the prototype, now named Hannibal and registered as G-AAGX, was flown by Squadron Leader Thomas Harold England for the types first flight. In May 1931, the aircraft was granted its certificate of airworthiness, permitting its use for commercial flights. On 11 June of that year, the first paying passengers were flown to Paris. The extremely high cost of air travel at this time usually limited flights to members of high society, such as royalty, celebrities, and senior business figures and the H.P.42/45 fleet were viewed as Imperial Airways' flagships and were accordingly provided with a luxurious onboard service and an elaborately decorated interior. They acquired a favourable reputation with the flying public, particularly for their dependability, and accumulated a combined mileage in excess of 10 million miles (16 million km) in nine years with Imperial Airways.

A key requirement of Imperial Airways was for its airliners to land safely at low speed, on the grass or unpaved airfields common at the time. Without using flaps, this required a large wing area (almost as much as a 767 that weighs over 10 times as much). During 1951, Peter Masefield wrote, "The trouble about a slow aeroplane with a really low wing loading is the way it insists on wallowing about in turbulent air ... One of the reasons why seven times as many people fly to Paris to-day, compared with 1931, is that the incidence of airsickness in modern aircraft is only one-hundredth of that in the pre-War types." Another writer remembered "I had quite often been landed in a '42' at Lympne to take on sufficient fuel to complete the flight (from Paris) to London against a headwind – 90 mph (140 km/h) was its normal cruising speed." However, while that was three times faster than a combination of steamships and trains used prior to airplanes, several French aircraft types on the same route were significantly faster, including the Wibault 280, which first flew in the same year, and cruised at 140 mph (230 km/h). When the H.P.42s were impressed on 1 September 1939, they had recorded almost a decade without any fatalities while in civilian service.

In 1933, Imperial attempted to purchase two more H.P.42s, to be powered by Armstrong Siddeley Tiger engines, but would not accept Handley Page's quoted price of £42,000 each, which was much higher than the original price of £21,000 in 1931, so, instead, they ordered two Short Scyllas, a landplane version of the Short Kent flying boat.

== Individual histories ==
Four H.P.42 and four H.P.45 aircraft were delivered, while two of the H.P.45s were later converted into H.P.42s.

=== H.P.42 ===
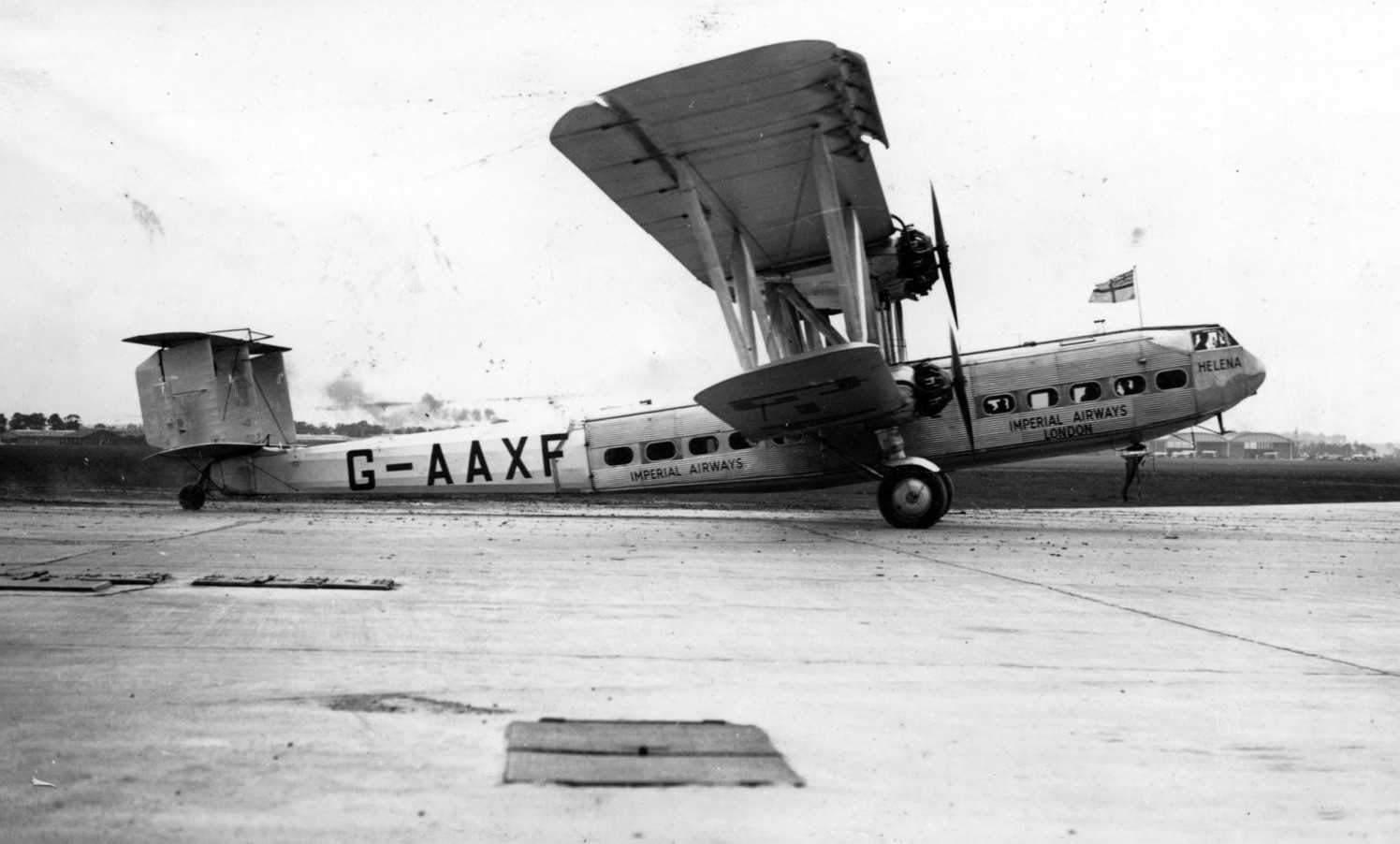
H.P.42 G-AAXF Helena at Paris–Le Bourget Airport, May 1932

==== G-AAGX Hannibal ====
The first flight of the prototype, Hannibal, was on 14 November 1930. The aircraft was named after Hannibal, the Carthaginian military commander.

On 8 August 1931, while on a scheduled passenger flight from Croydon to Paris the port lower engine failed. Debris from the failed engine struck the port upper propeller, causing it to vibrate so severely it had to be shut down. A forced landing was made at Five Oak Green, Kent where the aircraft suffered further damage to a wing and another propeller, and the tail was ripped off by a tree stump. There were no major injuries amongst the 20 passengers and crew. The aircraft was dismantled and taken to Croydon by road for rebuild. Hannibal was again damaged at the RAF temporary landing ground at Semakh on the Sea of Galilee on 17 November 1932, by strong winds. The fuselage and heavily damaged wings were sent by 3 ft 5 in (1.05 m) gauge Hedjaz Railway to Haifa, where it was transferred to the 1.435 m (4 ft 8.5 in) standard gauge Palestine Railways and forwarded to Heliopolis for repair.

It disappeared over the Gulf of Oman on 1 March 1940, with eight aboard, including the First World War ace Group Captain Harold Whistler and the Indian politician Sir A. T. Pannirselvam. An early report that wreckage of the aircraft had been located, turned out to be incorrect. No trace has ever been discovered and the cause of its loss remains unknown.

==== G-AAUC Horsa ====
G-AAUC was originally named for Hecate, the Greek goddess but was soon renamed for Horsa, conqueror of Britain and brother of Hengist. The aircraft first flew on 11 September 1931 and later was impressed into No. 271 Squadron RAF as AS981. It burned after a forced landing on uneven ground at Moresby Parks, near Whitehaven, Cumberland, on 7 August 1940.

==== G-AAUD Hanno ====
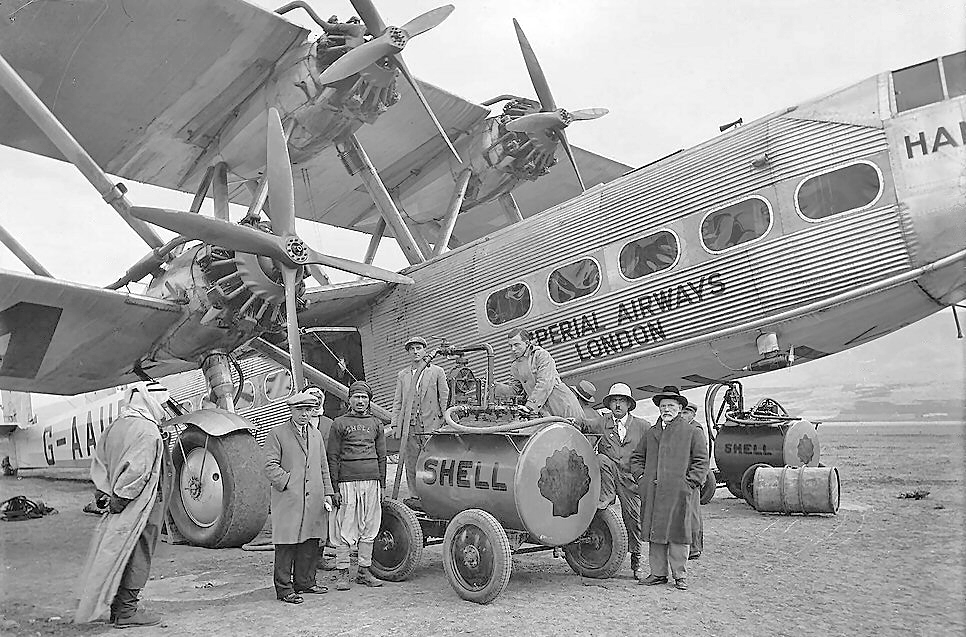
Refuelling Hanno at Samakh, Tiberias, Palestine, October 1931.

G-AAUD, production number 42/3, was named for the Carthaginian, Hanno the Navigator, who explored the Atlantic coast of Africa around 570 BC. Hanno first flew on 19 July 1931 and was later converted to a H.P.42(W) (Hannibal class). It suffered a hard landing at Entebbe, but was recovered, refurbished and returned to service. It appeared in the fifteen-minute 1937 Strand Film Company documentary Air Outpost, landing at Al Mahatta in Sharjah, now in the United Arab Emirates. The aircraft was impressed into No. 271 Squadron RAF and was damaged beyond repair in a gale at Whitchurch Airport, Bristol along with Heracles on 19 March 1940.

==== G-AAUE Hadrian ====
G-AAUE, production number 42/2, was named after the Roman emperor Hadrian. Hadrian's first flight was on 24 June 1931. The aircraft made a brief appearance in the 1936 movie Song of Freedom starring Paul Robeson. On the outbreak of the Second World War, Hadrian was impressed into No. 271 Squadron RAF as AS982, at RAF Odiham. On 6 December 1940, Hadrian was torn loose from its moorings at Doncaster Airport in a gale, cartwheeled, and ended up inverted on a railway track next to the airport. The aircraft was too badly damaged to be worth repairing.

=== H.P.45 ===
The H.P.45 carried more passengers at the expense of range and baggage capacity, and was intended for Imperial Airways' European routes.

==== G-AAXC Heracles ====
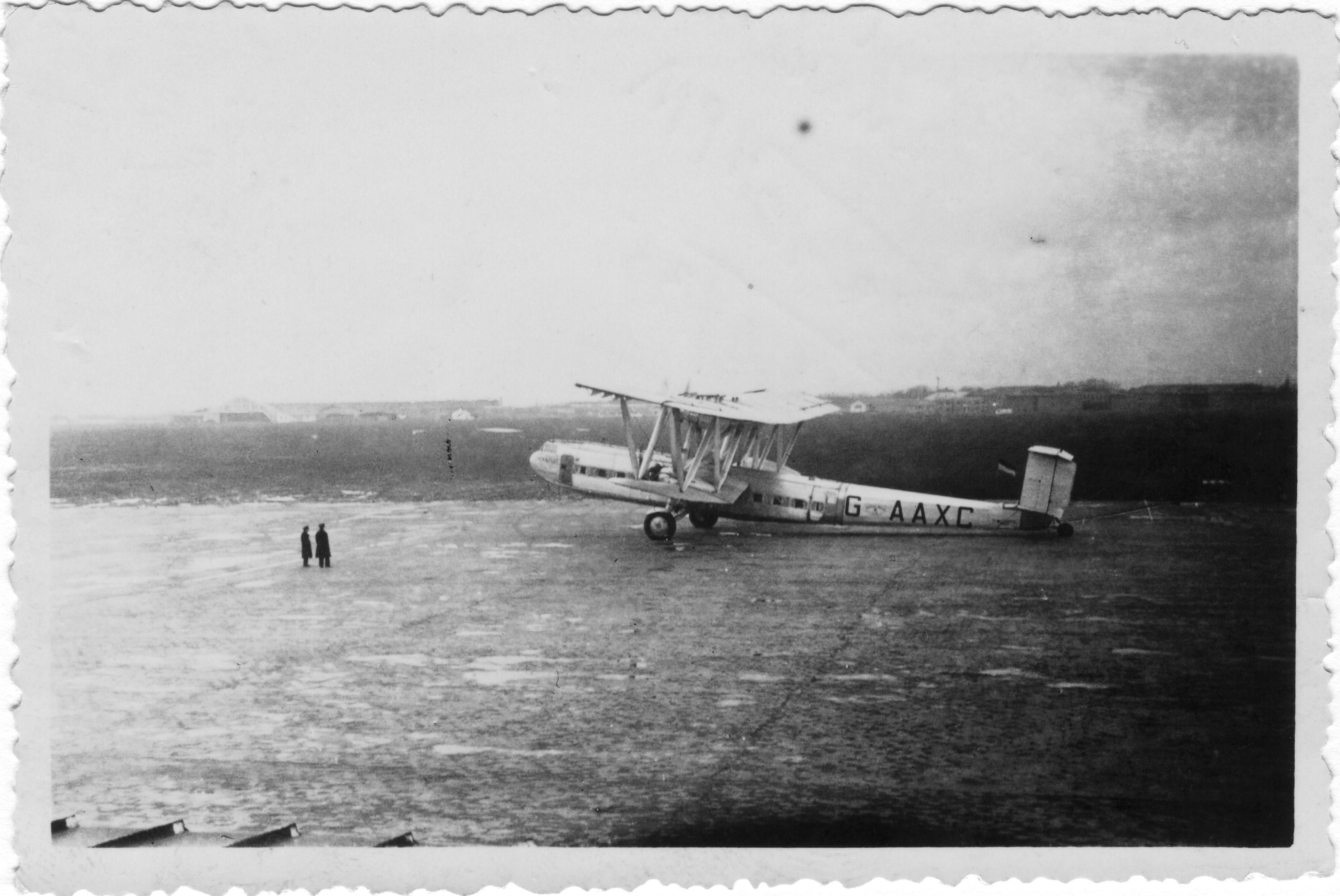
The G-AAXC Heracles at Paris–Le Bourget Airport in April 1935

G-AAXC was named after Heracles, also known as Hercules, from Greek mythology who was noted for his strength. On 8 August 1931, Heracles made its first flight and tt was most commonly operated between Paris, Cologne, and Zürich. Heracles features briefly in the 1932 sports comedy The Lucky Number featuring Gordon Harker. On 23 July 1937, it had accumulated one million miles. Heracles was impressed into service with the RAF on 3 March 1940 but was damaged beyond repair in a gale on 19 March 1940 at Whitchurch Airport, Bristol, when it was blown together with Hanno.

==== G-AAXD Horatius ====
G-AAXD was named after Horatius, a Roman hero. Horatius first flew on 6 November 1931. Horatius can briefly be seen in action in the film Air Outpost, and good footage appears of it in the 1935 film Her Last Affaire and the 1937 film Stolen Holiday. On 9 December 1937, Horatius was struck by lightning while crossing the Channel from Paris to Croydon. A precautionary landing was made at Lympne where minor damage was found on the wing. In September 1938, Horatius suffered damage to its port undercarriage and lower port wing in a forced landing also at Lympne. The aircraft was repaired and returned to service, before being impressed by the RAF in the Second World War. Returning from France on 7 November 1939, the aircraft was unable to find its destination at Exeter due to bad weather and was forced to make an emergency landing at Tiverton Golf Course during which, it hit two trees and was destroyed. A four-bladed wooden propeller from the aircraft was salvaged and was on display at the Croydon Airport Visitor Centre, situated in the former Croydon Airport terminal building.

==== G-AAXE Hengist ====
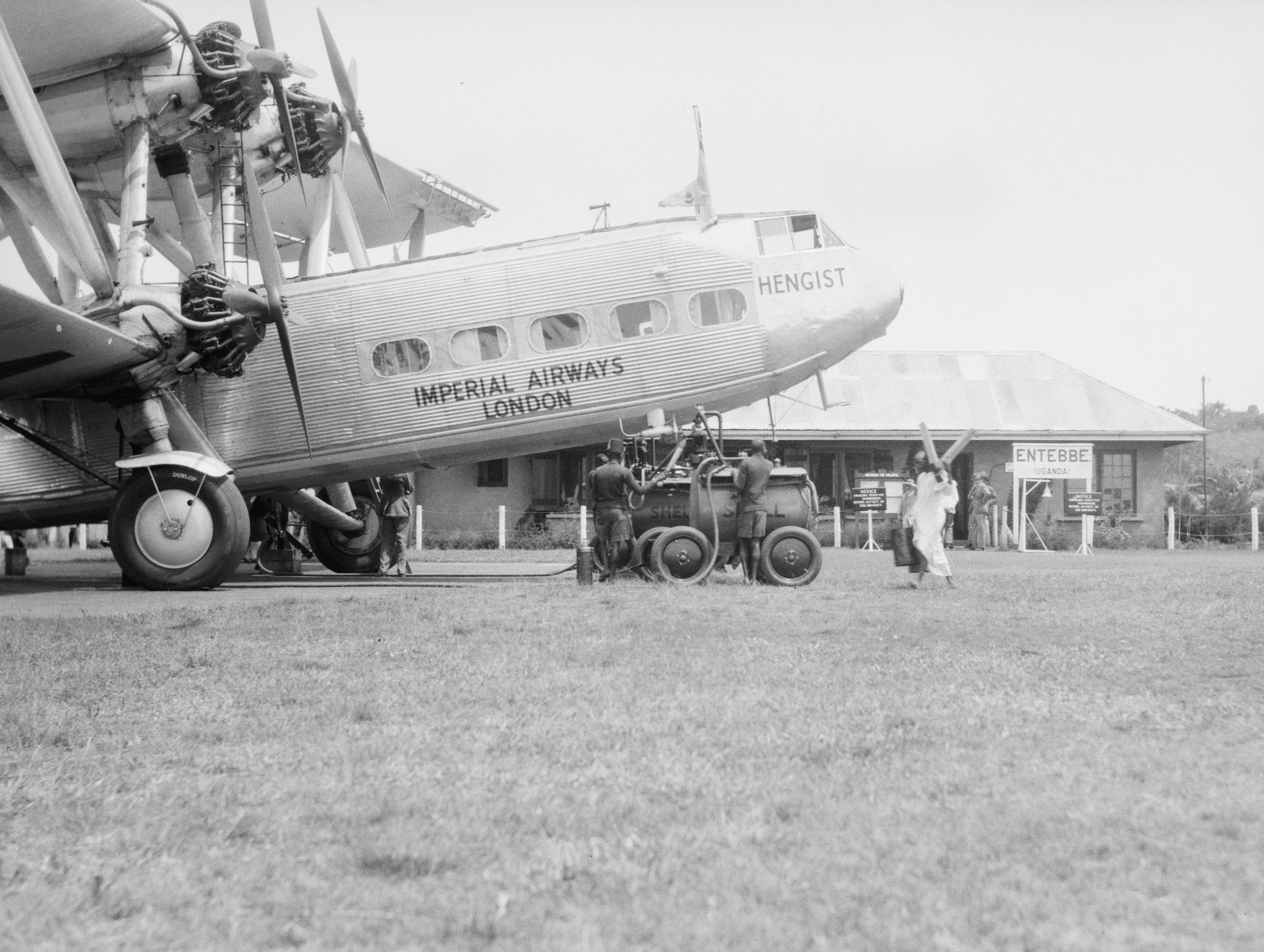
Hengist at Entebbe Airport in Uganda, 1936

G-AAXE was originally named for the Hesperides, but was soon renamed after Hengist, brother of Horsa and legendary conqueror of Britain. Hengist first flew on 8 December 1931. It was later converted from a European to an Eastern aircraft. Hengist was caught in an airship hangar fire and burned at Karachi, India on 31 May 1937, making it the only H.P.42/45 not to survive until the Second World War.

==== G-AAXF Helena ====
G-AAXF was named after Helena (Helen of Troy). It first flew on 30 December 1931. Like Hengist, it was converted to an Eastern aircraft. Parts of this airplane can be seen in the 1933 film The Solitaire Man. Helena was impressed into service with No. 271 Squadron RAF in May 1940. After a hard landing, the aircraft was grounded later that year; post-accident inspection condemned the airframe due to corrosion, and it was scrapped in 1941, except for the front fuselage section which was used as an office by the Royal Navy for several years.

== Replica ==
Several efforts have been made to produce an H.P.42 for heritage/preservation purposes. During 2015, a fundraising campaign was launched with the aim of producing a replica of the H.P.42. Original blueprints and other source material from the era are available and while a replica can be built to be airworthy, modern safety regulations prevent carrying paying passengers.

== Operators ==
United Kingdom

- Imperial Airways
- Royal Air Force
  - No. 271 Squadron RAF

== Specifications (H.P.42E) ==
Handley Page H.P.42 3-view

Data from Handley Page Aircraft since 1907

General characteristics

- Crew: 4
- Capacity: 24 passengers and 14.2 cu m mail/baggage
- Length: 92 ft 2 in (28.09 m)
- Wingspan: 130 ft 0 in (39.62 m)
- Height: 27 ft 0 in (8.23 m)
- Wing area: 2,989 sq ft (277.7 m^{2}) (Note: Upper 1999, Lower 990)
- Airfoil: RAF 28
- Empty weight: 17,740 lb (8,047 kg)
- Max takeoff weight: 28,000 lb (12,701 kg)
- Powerplant: 4 × Bristol Jupiter XIF 9-cylinder air-cooled radial piston engines, 490 hp (370 kW) each
- Propellers: 4-bladed fixed-pitch wooden propellers

Performance

- Maximum speed: 120 mph (190 km/h, 100 kn)
- Cruise speed: 100 mph (160 km/h, 87 kn)
- Range: 500 mi (800 km, 430 nmi)
- Rate of climb: 790 ft/min (4.0 m/s)

== Notable appearances in media ==
- The H.P.45 features in Roy Lockwood's 1934 short Shell Film Unit documentary Airport (a "day-in-the-life" of London's Croydon Airport). H.P.45 G-AAXC Heracles appears in loading, taxiing and take-off scenes, while H.P.45 G-AAXD Horatius is seen landing and being unloaded.
- G-AAXE Hengist is scene of the murder in the 1934 mystery novel The 12.30 from Croydon by Freeman Wills Crofts.
- The H.P.42 'Prometheus' features as a crime scene in Agatha Christie's 1935 Poirot novel Death In The Clouds.
- An H.P.42 briefly appears near the beginning of the animated film Kiki's Delivery Service by Studio Ghibli.
- A fictional fifth H.P.42 G-AAXJ Horus is prominently featured in Roger Leloup's comic series Yoko Tsuno, in the albums Message pour l'éternité and Anges et faucons.
- H.P.45 G-AAXD Horatius appears in the 1937 film "Stolen Holiday".

== See also ==
Aircraft of comparable role, configuration, and era

- Armstrong Whitworth Argosy
- Bréguet 393T
- Curtiss Model 53 Condor
- Farman F.224
- Liore et Olivier LeO 21
- Short Scylla
- Sikorsky S-37
