= Short Scylla =

British four-engined 39-seat biplane airliner

L.17 Scylla
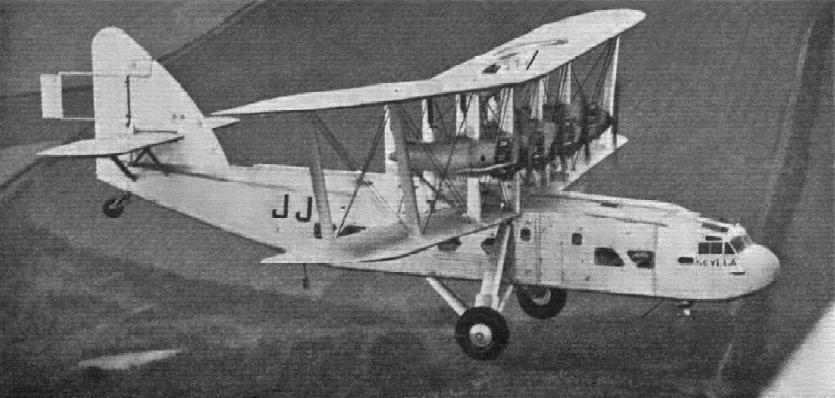

General information
- Type: Biplane airliner
- Manufacturer: Short Brothers
- Primary user: Imperial Airways
- Number built: 2

History
- First flight: 26 March 1934
- Retired: 1940
- Developed from: Short Kent

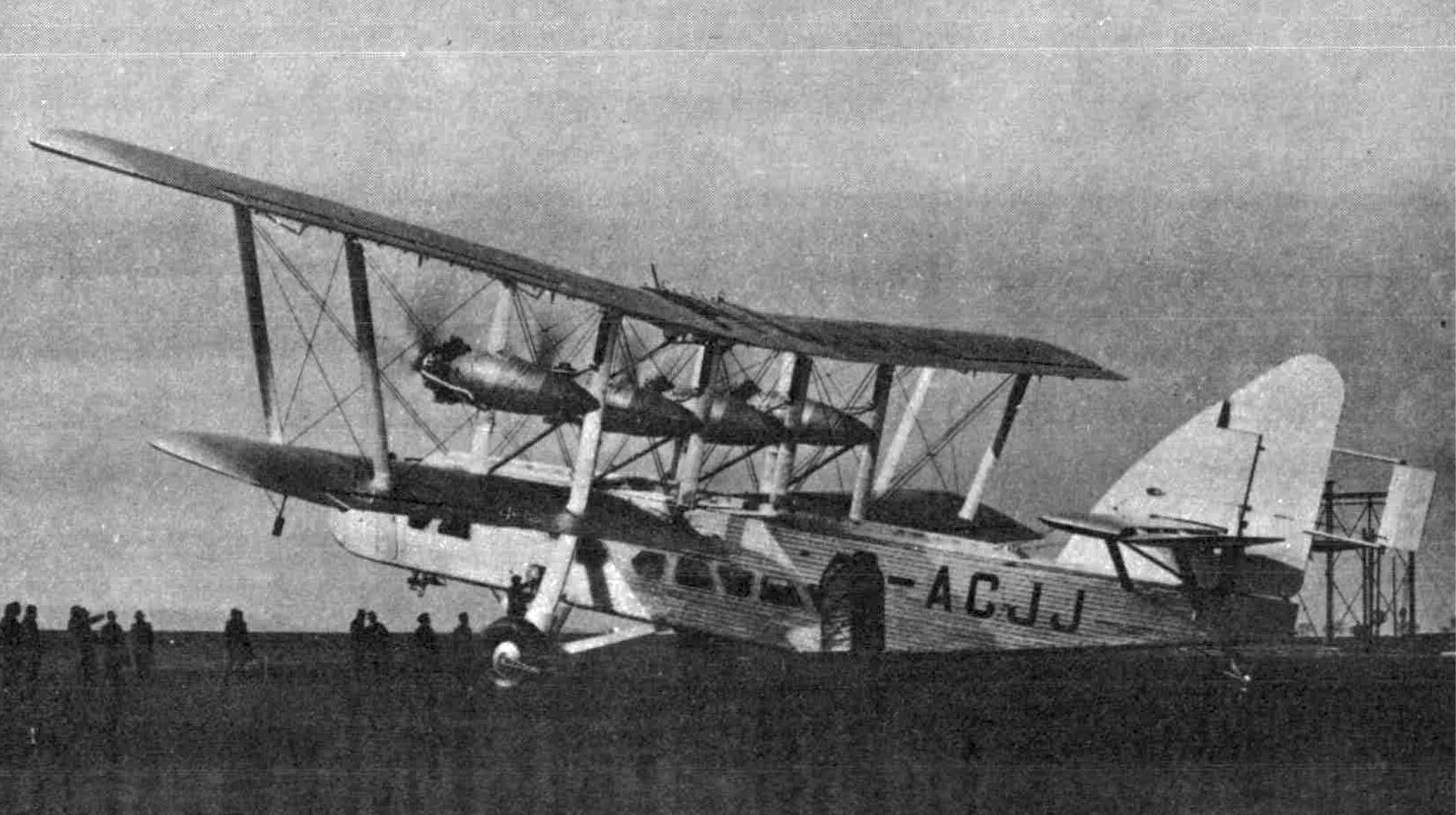
Scylla with distinctive Flettner type tab visible on the rudder

The Short L.17 Scylla was a British four-engined 39-seat biplane airliner designed and built by Short Brothers at the request of Imperial Airways to supplement the Handley Page H.P.42 fleet already in service after Handley Page quoted an excessive price for two additional H.P.42s. They were ordered in 1933.

Imperial Airways used the Scylla for scheduled flights from London to Paris and other European cities. Two aircraft were built, Scylla (G-ACJJ) and Syrinx (G-ACJK). Both served with the airline, until its merger into BOAC in 1939, when both were taken out of service the following year, Scylla after being wrecked and Syrinx being scrapped.

== Design and development ==
The Scylla was a land-based development of the Short Kent (S.17) flying boat which used the Kent's flying surfaces on a new fuselage. It was an all-metal biplane with a wingspan of 113 ft (34 m) powered originally by four Bristol Jupiter XFBM radial engines mounted on vertical struts between the upper and lower planes. The square-section fuselage was mounted below the lower wing while the tail had a single fin and rudder with a horizontal stabilizer mounted mid way up. The Scylla was originally fitted with a Flettner-type trim tab mounted on arms extended out from the rudder's trailing edge to reduce control forces. An experimental servo tab mounted on the trailing edge of the rudder was also tested, on G-ACJJ Scylla which led to a patent application submitted jointly by Shorts and Dudley Lloyd Parkes on 7 August 1936.

The main undercarriage had one fixed wheel on each side, mounted on three diagonally-braced struts, one to the upper and two to the lower edge of the fuselage; there was a single tailwheel. Ailerons were fitted to both upper and lower wings.

The engine nacelles were designed to receive Bristol Jupiter, Pegasus or Perseus engines without modification, This later enabled the two inboard Jupiters of G-ACJK Syrinx to be easily replaced with Perseus IIL sleeve valve engines, to test their performance in airline conditions. Syrinx was fitted with four Pegasus XC engines when it was rebuilt after it had been severely damaged when blown over by crosswinds while taxiing at Brussels airport.

== Operators ==
United Kingdom

- Imperial Airways

== Specifications ==
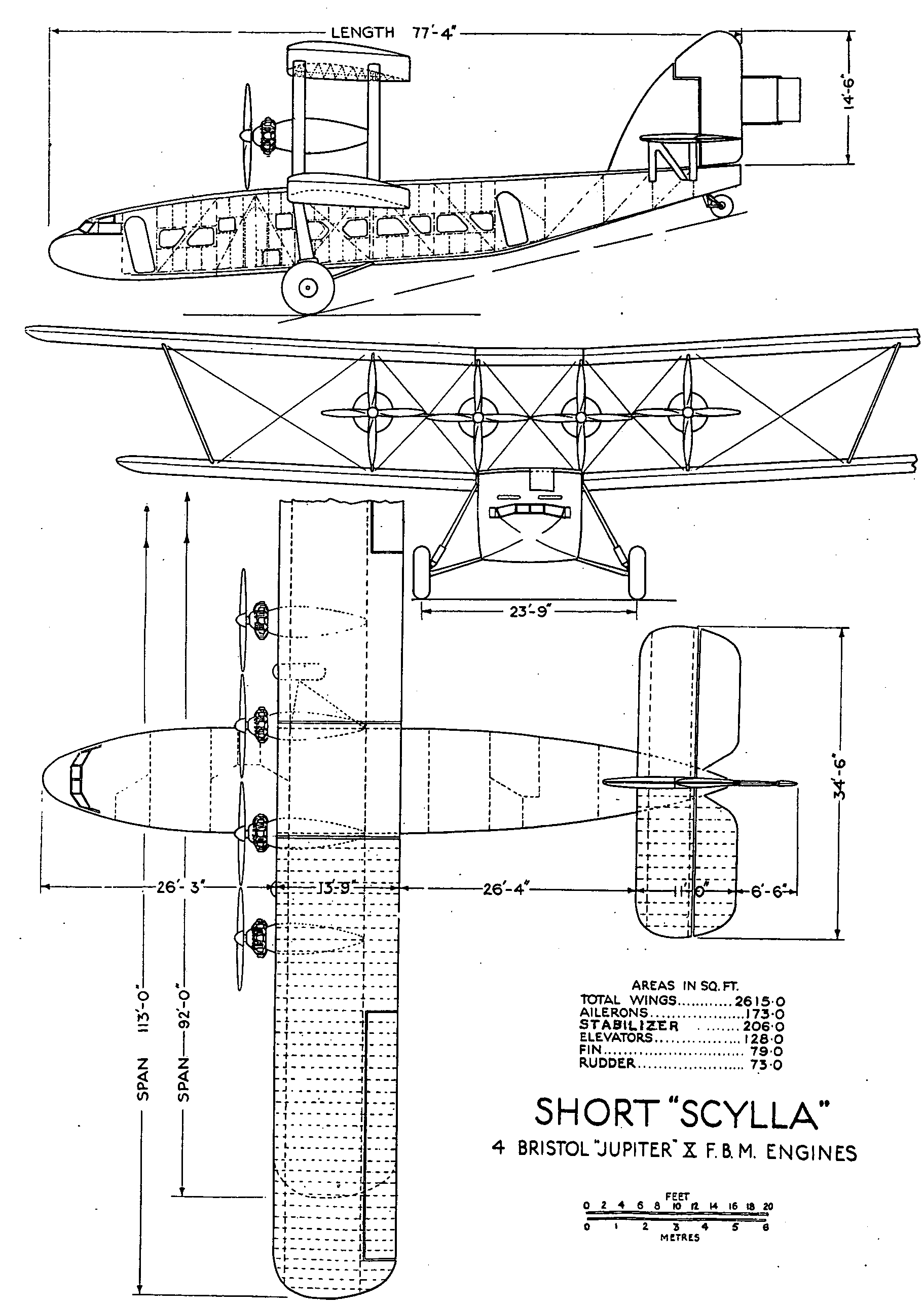
Short Scylla 3-view drawing from NACA-AC-190

Data from

General characteristics

- Crew: four
- Capacity: 39 passengers
- Length: 83 ft 10 in (25.55 m)
- Wingspan: 113 ft 0 in (34.44 m)
- Height: 31 ft 7 in (9.63 m)
- Wing area: 2,615 sq ft (242.9 m^{2})
- Empty weight: 22,650 lb (10,274 kg)
- Gross weight: 33,500 lb (15,195 kg)
- Powerplant: 4 × Bristol Jupiter XFBM nine-cylinder air-cooled radial engines, 555 hp (414 kW) each

- Other engine configurations included:

- Two 595 hp (444 kW) Jupiter XFBM radials (outer pair) and two 540 hp (400 kW) Bristol Perseus IIL sleeve valve radial engines (inner pair)
- Four 660 hp (490 kW) Pegasus XC radial engines

- Propellers: 4-bladed Fixed pitch wooden propeller

Performance

- Maximum speed: 137 mph (220 km/h, 119 kn)
- Cruise speed: 105 mph (169 km/h, 91 kn)

== See also ==
Related development

- Short Calcutta
- Short Kent

Related lists

- List of civil aircraft

== Bibliography ==
- Barnes, C. H.; James, D. N. (1989). Shorts Aircraft since 1900. London: Putnam. ISBN 0851778194.
- Cassidy, Brian (2004). "Flying Empires: Short 'C' class Empire flying boats" (PDF). Queens Parade Press.
- Gunston, Bill, ed. (1980). The Illustrated Encyclopedia of Propeller Airliners. London: Phoebus. ISBN 0711200629.
- Jackson, A. J. (1988). British Civil Aircraft 1919-1972: Volume III. London: Putnam. ISBN 0851778186.
- "Century-of-Flight.net: Short Scylla".
- "Short L17 Scylla". Imperial Airways project.
