= Hambling =

Hambling is a surname. Notable people with the surname include:

- Arthur Hambling (1888–1952), English actor
- Gerry Hambling (1926–2013), English film editor
- Maggi Hambling (born 1945), English painter and sculptor
- Robert Hambling, Australian film editor and music video director

== See also ==
- Hambling baronets
