= Cairo–Baghdad air route =

- Founder: Royal Air Force
- Purpose: Airmail
- Date: 23 June 1921
- Location: Defunct
- Airlines: Imperial Airways

The Cairo–Baghdad Air Route was an airmail route established by the Royal Air Force following a conference of British military and civil officials held in Cairo in March 1921. The aim was to create an air link between Egypt, Mandate Palestine and British Mandate of Mesopotamia (Iraq), which were under British control following the end of World War I. The western end of the route was the airfield at Heliopolis, on the outskirts of Cairo. The eastern end was at Hinaidi airfield, just south of Baghdad. It was intended the route would eventually extend to India and perhaps even to Australia.

In 1921 A L Holt was involved with creating the track across the Syrian desert from Baghdad to the eastern edge of the basalt desert in Jordan, which was to act as a guide track for the pilots of the Cairo – Baghdad air route.

Two cachets as used on early RAF carried mail

The route was opened on 23 June 1921 and the first mail from Baghdad destined for London was carried on 28 July 1921 arriving there on 9 August. On 4 August mail was despatched left London arriving in Baghdad on 17 August. The aircraft used were RAF Vickers Vernons, twin-engined biplanes were capable of carrying up to seven passengers and mail, but, for longer endurance, usually carried a smaller load. Initially the price of mail was 1 shilling an ounce, but by December it had been reduced to 6d per ounce and as the route became established this was further reduced to 3d (old pence).

The route was 866 miles long but actually between 860 and 870 miles and in the Vernons took an average time of just over twelve hours, excluding stops. The route consisted of two sections. The Western third was about 330 miles from Heliopolis for which five hours of fuel was carried. This section was mostly over the well populated coastal plains between the Nile and the Dead Sea, where there were plenty of landmarks by which to steer. The Eastern section (540 miles) was over the Jordanian and Iraqi deserts, uninhabited except for nomadic tribes and with few landmarks. A visible track over this part of the route was laid across the ground by the wheels of an armoured car driven for this purpose, or by a plough pulled by a Fordson tractor, depending upon the nature of the terrain. 26 emergency landing grounds were made in the desert, several of which included spare tanks of fuel.

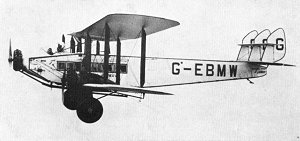
Imperial Airways de Havilland Hercules G-EBMW was used on the route

In 1926 Imperial Airways took over the route from the RAF. Using three-engined de Havilland Hercules aircraft of greater range than the Vernons, the route was extended first to Basra and then to Karachi in India, a distance of 2,500 miles, as part of an air passenger service.

== See also ==
- Handley Page Hinaidi

== Sources ==
- The Baghdad Air Mail, Roderick Hill, Edward Arnold and Co, London 1929. (Republished 2005 by Tempus/Nonesuch, ISBN 1-84588-009-9)
- British Air Policy between the Wars 1918 – 1939, H Montgomery Hyde, Heinemann, London 1976, SBN 434 47983 7
