= A. L. Holt =

British explorer

A. L. Holt MBE, MC
- Born: 1896
- Died: 1971 (aged 74–75)
- Military career
- Allegiance: British
- Rank: Major
- Unit: Royal Engineers
- Other work: Explorer

Major A. L. Holt, MBE, MC (1896–1971) was a British military officer and explorer.

In the 1920s while a member of the Royal Engineers, Holt led a number of motorised expeditions through the deserts of Arabia, the first time such long journeys had been undertaken with such a large number of vehicles.

In 1921 Holt was involved in creating a track across the Syrian Desert from Baghdad to the eastern edge of the Harrat al-Sham in Jordan, which was to act as a guide track for the pilots of the Cairo – Baghdad air route. In 1923 Holt took Rose Wilder Lane, journalist B.D. MacDonald and Holt's wife by car across the same desert.

Holt travelled on occasion with St. John Philby and Gerard Leachman.

In 1923 he proposed a route for a trans-Arabian railway which he had personally surveyed in 1922 by automobile. He writes,

I have taken a convoy of Fords 350 miles in the desert without touching water. The extraordinary advantage of this in reconnaissance needs no emphasis.

The railway was never built.
