= 1929 Jask Imperial Airways de Havilland Hercules crash =

1929 plane crash at Jask Airport, Hormozgan, Iran

Jask Imperial Airways de Havilland Hercules crash
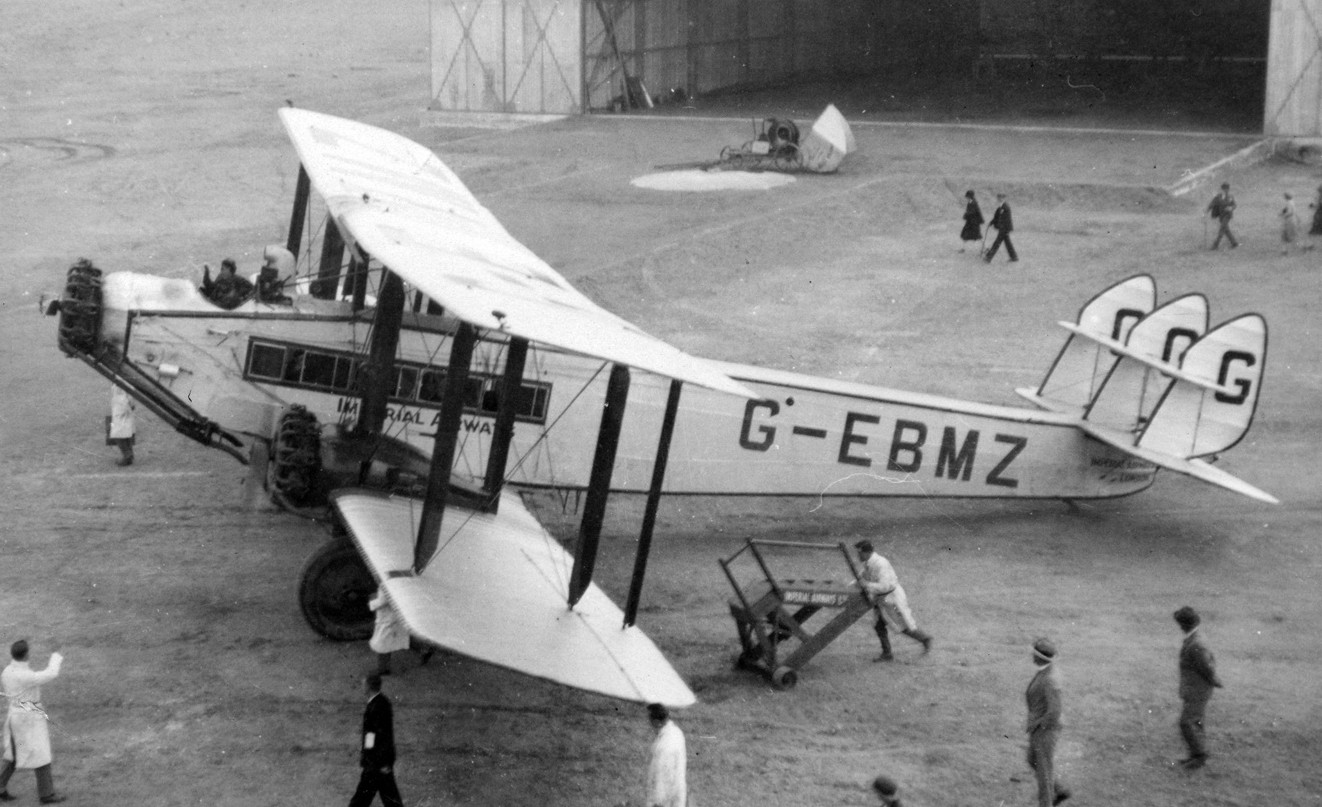
- G-EBMZ "City Of Jerusalem", the de Havilland Hercules involved in the accident.

Accident
- Date: 6 September 1929
- Summary: Pilot error, stall, loss of control
- Site: Jask Airport, Jask, Iran; 25°39′13″N 057°47′57″E

Aircraft
- Aircraft type: de Havilland DH.66 Hercules
- Aircraft name: City of Jerusalem
- Operator: Imperial Airways
- Registration: G-EBMZ
- Passengers: 1
- Crew: 4
- Fatalities: 3
- Injuries: 2
- Survivors: 2

On 6 September 1929 a de Havilland Hercules three-engined biplane of Imperial Airways crashed on landing at Jask Airport, near the town of Jask in Iran on the Gulf of Oman. The aircraft was carrying mail from the United Kingdom to India. The pilot, a mechanic and a passenger were killed. (Note: One of those onboard, a Mr J Court was variously described as a Mechanic or Spare Mechanic or a member of the Imperial Airways Staff and is described as either a passenger or crew.)

== Aircraft ==
The aircraft was a de Havilland Hercules three-engined biplane, registered in the United Kingdom as G-EBMZ and delivered new to Imperial Airways in 1927. It was named City of Jerusalem by the airline.

== Accident ==
The City of Jerusalem was carrying mail from the United Kingdom to India. While attempting a night landing at Jask the pilot misjudged the aircraft's altitude and it stalled and crashed. The landing gear was destroyed and the port wings were badly damaged. Flares were fitted to the wingtips and had been ignited to provide illumination for the night landing. The port wing had been forced backwards in the crash until it lay alongside the fuselage; the burning flare set fire to fuel spilled from the damaged fuel tanks. The pilot, a mechanic and a passenger were killed, the chief mechanic and wireless operator were seriously injured.

== Investigation ==
The investigation was carried out by the Government of India and the British Air Ministry; the conclusion was that additional precautions were to be adopted, but noted that wing-mounted flares were still regarded as a satisfactory form of emergency landing aid.
