= West Australian Airways =

Airline in Western Australia

| IATA | ICAO | Call sign |
|---|---|---|
| unk | unk | unk |
- Founded: 1921: As Western Australian Airways; 1926: Renamed West Australian Airways
- Ceased operations: 1936

West Australian Airways was an Australian airline based in Geraldton, Western Australia. Established by World War I pilot Norman Brearley on 5 December 1921 as Western Australian Airways, it was the first airline in Australia to establish a scheduled air service. The first service left Geraldton on 2 November 1922. On 12 June 1936, West Australian Airways was purchased by Adelaide Airways for £A25,000, equivalent to A$2.7 million in 2022. In July that year, it became part of Australian National Airways.

== History ==
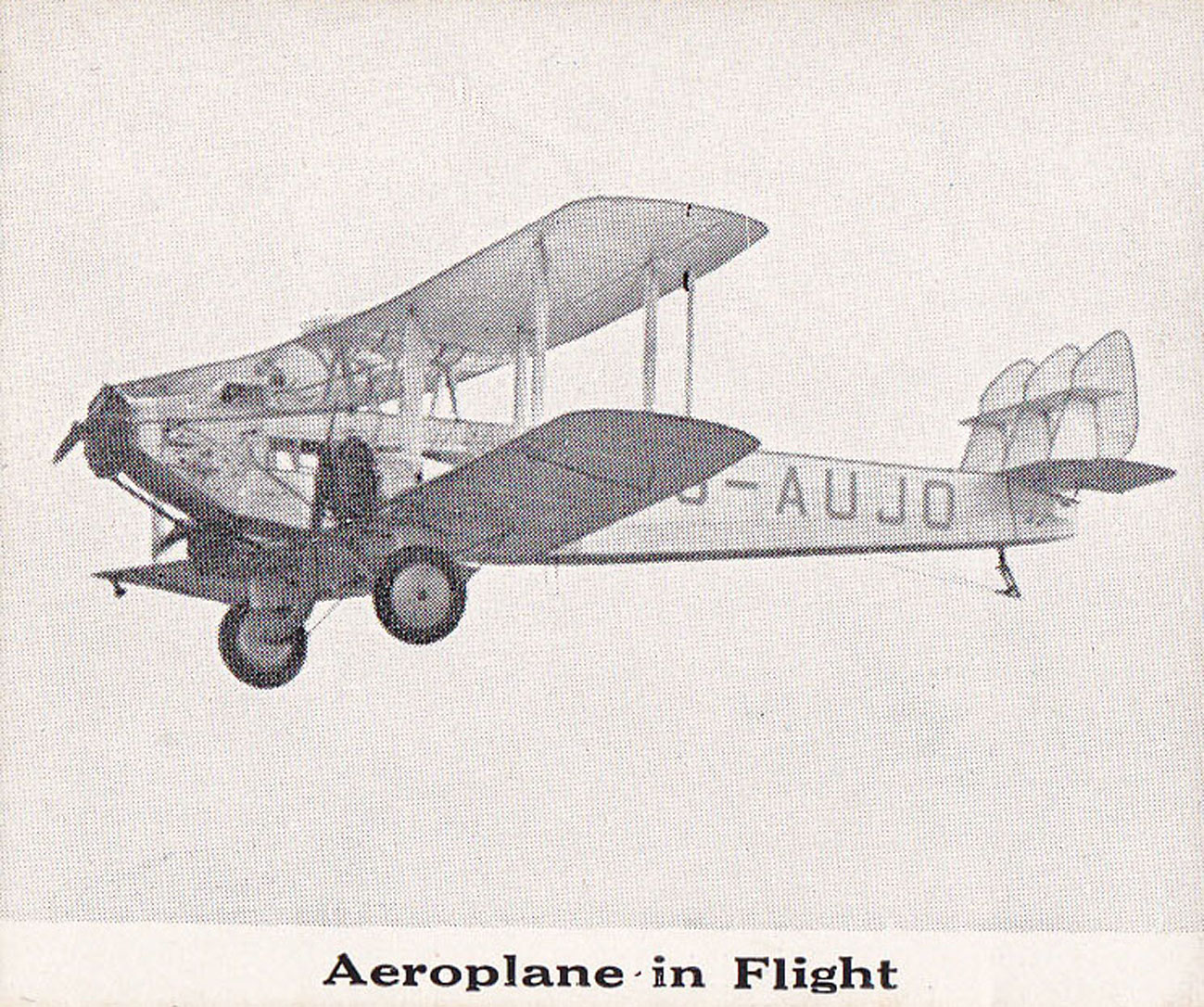
de Havilland Hercules used for first interstate airmail flight

Following World War I, Norman Brearley, who had served with the Royal Flying Corps, returned to Australia in 1919. He brought with him two Avro 504J aircraft. In May 1921, the federal government advertised for tenders for a subsidised air-mail and passenger contract, operating a weekly service between Geraldton and Derby. Brearley submitted multiple submissions and on 2 August 1921, was advised that one of his tenders had been accepted. Brearley then set about hiring five pilots; Val Abbott, Arthur Blake, Bob Fawcett, Charles Kingsford Smith and Leonard Taplin.

On 5 December 1921, on the first flight as an airline, Ted Broad and Bob Fawcett in the Bristol Tourer G-AUDI crashed 130 kilometres (81 mi) north of Geraldton. Brearley suspended flight operations until 21 February 1922.

On 3 December 1926, Western Australian Airways changed its name to West Australian Airways, though for the majority of its existence it was usually referred to as simply Airways. On 2 July 1928, Australia's first interstate airmail contract, between Perth and Adelaide, was awarded to West Australian Airways, for five years. Services began on 26 May 1929. The service used four new DH-66 Hercules aircraft with space for 16 passengers and a cruising speed of 176 kilometres per hour (109 mph). A hot luncheon was provided at Ceduna, dinner at the airline-owned hostel at Forrest and catering at Kalgoorlie.

On 19 April 1934, the federal government awarded the five-year Perth – Daly Waters route contract to MacRobertson Miller Aviation Co. This decision left West Australian Airways with only the now unsubsidised Perth–Adelaide route. In April 1936, Adelaide Airways Ltd offered to purchase West Australian Airways and on 12 June the purchase was finalised for £A 25,000. On 1 July, Adelaide Airways and West Australian Airways became part of the new Australian National Airways.

== See also ==
- List of defunct airlines of Australia
- Aviation in Australia
- MacRobertson Miller Airlines
