= Short Kent =

British four-engined biplane flying boat airliner

S.17 Kent
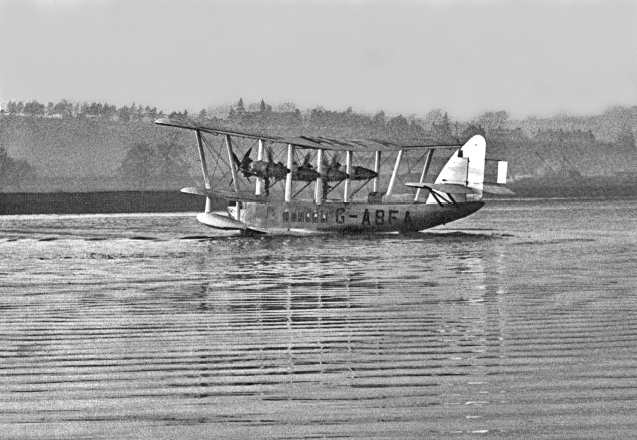

General information
- Type: Biplane flying boat airliner
- Manufacturer: Short Brothers
- Primary user: Imperial Airways
- Number built: 3

History
- Manufactured: 1930-1931
- Introduction date: 1931
- First flight: 24 February 1931
- Retired: 1938
- Developed from: Short Calcutta
- Variant: Short Scylla

The Short S.17 Kent was a British four-engined 15-seat biplane luxury flying boat airliner, designed and built by Shorts to meet a requirement from Imperial Airways for an aircraft with greater range than the Short Calcutta. The new aircraft was to have sufficient range to fly the stage from Mirabella, Crete, to Alexandria in Egypt without the need for refuelling stops in Italian colonial territory due to a political row which had led the Italian Government to ban British aircraft from its ports.

Three aircraft were built, each receiving its own name: Scipio, Sylvanus and Satyrus; they were referred to collectively within Imperial Airlines as the Scipio Class flying boats. Each had an aircrew of three (two pilots and a radio operator/navigator) and a steward to prepare meals and light refreshments for the passengers.

== Design and development ==
The Short Kent flying boat was essentially an enlarged, four-engined version of the Calcutta, with the same passenger carrying capacity but with an increased payload for mail and fuel. It was powered by four Bristol Jupiter XFBM radial engines mounted on vertical struts between the upper and lower planes.

The wings were constructed using corrugated duralumin box spars and tubular rib assemblies, with a fabric covering and Frise ailerons on the upper and lower wings. Duralumin walkways were provided to allow ready access to the engines for maintenance purposes. The tail unit consisted of braced monoplane horizontal and vertical stabilizers; the tailplane was fitted with Flettner-type servo tabs for trimming on the Short Scylla which had the same wings and tail as the Kent.

The anodised duralumin fuselage was mounted below the lower wing, with the planing bottom of the hull made of stainless steel (as on the Singapore II) with a transverse main step. The use of stainless steel reduced the frequency of land inspections of the hull. The bimetallic corrosion problems experienced on the Singapore II hull had been solved; Short Brothers became the first company to master the technique of building seaplane floats and flying boat hulls in this combination of metals.

A quick-release hook (controlled by the pilots) was provided, which enabled the captain to start, warm up and (when required) run all four engines up to full power for takeoff while the aircraft was still attached to the mooring buoy.

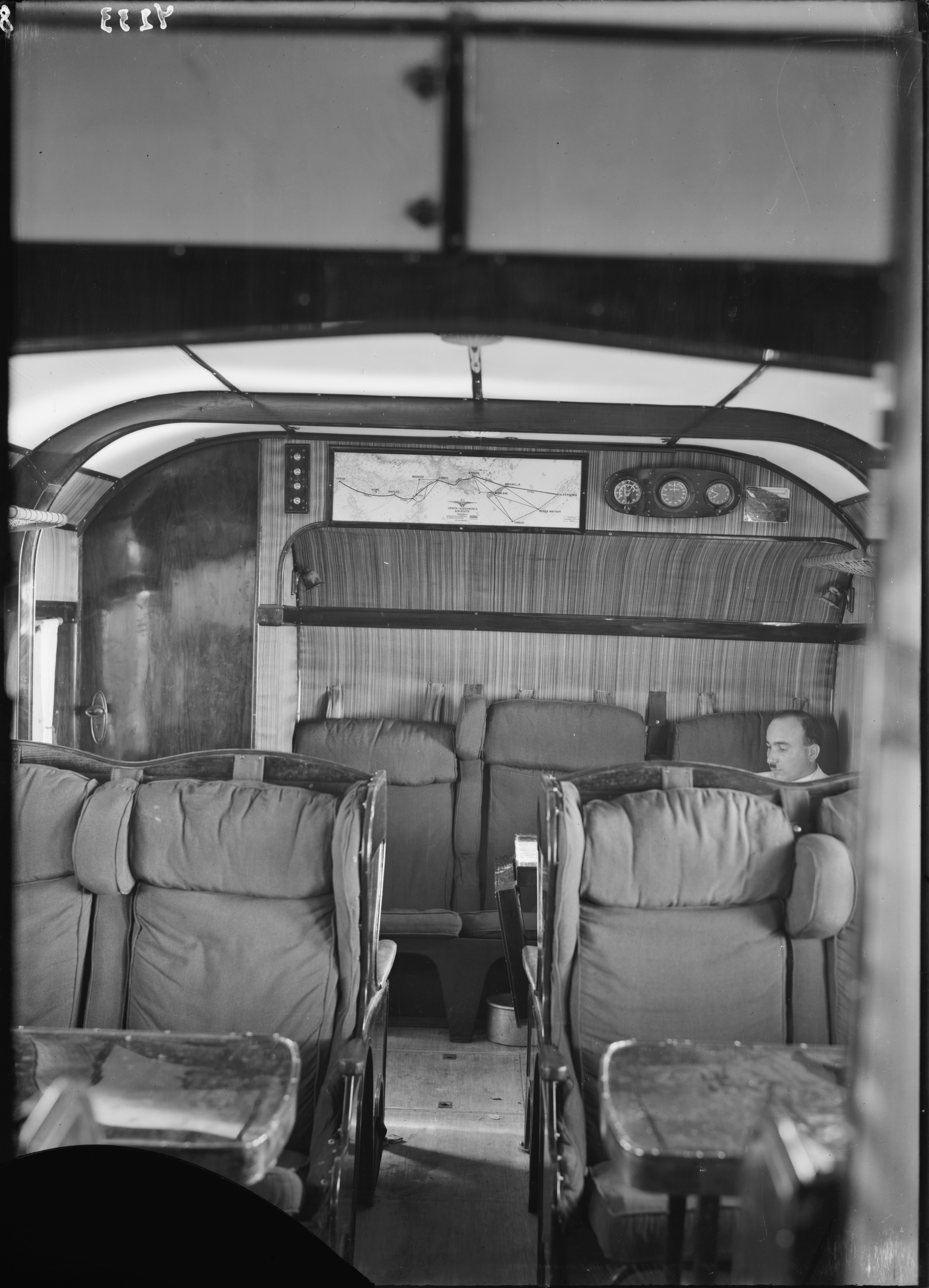
Passenger cabin of the Satyrus

Maximum comfort was required for passengers and crew: the Kent's passenger cabin was 8 ft 6 in (2.59 m) wide and 14 ft (4.27 m) long. The seating was arranged in four rows of facing pairs, with a centre aisle, Pullman-style. The steward's pantry, situated on the port side aft of the passenger cabin, was equipped with twin-burner oil stoves on which stewards (and the valets of valued passengers) could cook meals in flight. The toilet and washroom were opposite the pantry; the mail and freight compartment was further aft.

Special attention was paid to sound levels in the passenger cabin and crew's stations; accordingly the engines were fitted with exhaust collector rings and long tailpipes, to reduce exhaust noise inside the hull.

The cockpit, for two pilots, was fully enclosed (unlike that of the Calcutta's) with a separate Radio Officer's station directly aft of the cockpit.

== Service history ==
In October 1930, Short Brothers started building the first of the three S.17 Kent flying boats (G-ABFA, named Scipio). It was launched and flown on 24 February 1931 by Shorts' Chief Test Pilot J. Lankester Parker and was in service in the Mediterranean in May of that year. The second (G-ABFB, named Sylvanus) was launched on 31 March 1931; the third Kent (G-ABFC, Satyrus) was launched on 30 April 1931 and flown for the first time on 2 May 1931.

Imperial Airways used the Kent aircraft on the Mediterranean stages of its routes to India and beyond, also using them to survey planned routes to South Africa and Australia.

On 22 August 1936 "Scipio", on its way back from India, flipped over and sank in "Mirabella Harbour" (between the mainland of Crete and the island of Spinalonga) after landing heavily, killing two passengers. Sylvanus was destroyed by fire at Brindisi on 9 November 1935. Only Satyrus survived to be taken out of service and scrapped in June 1938.

In 1933 Imperial Airways placed an order for two landplanes based on the Kent; known initially as the S.17/L and later as the L.17, these became the Short Scylla, of which two were built and given the names "Scylla" and "Syrinx".

== Operators ==
United Kingdom

- Imperial Airways

== Specifications ==
Data from British Civil Aircraft 1919-1972

General characteristics

- Crew: three
- Capacity: 16 passengers
- Length: 78 ft 5 in (23.90 m)
- Wingspan: 113 ft 0 in (34.44 m)
- Height: 28 ft 0 in (8.53 m)
- Wing area: 2,640 sq ft (245 m^{2})
- Empty weight: 20,460 lb (9,280 kg)
- Gross weight: 32,000 lb (14,515 kg)
- Powerplant: 4 × Bristol Jupiter XFBM 9-cylinder air-cooled radial engines, 555 hp (414 kW) each (rated at 4,000 ft (1,200 m))

Performance

- Maximum speed: 137 mph (220 km/h, 119 kn) at 5,000 ft (1,500 m)
- Cruise speed: 105 mph (169 km/h, 91 kn)
- Range: 450 mi (720 km, 390 nmi)
- Service ceiling: 17,500 ft (5,300 m)
- Rate of climb: 840 ft/min (4.3 m/s)

== See also ==
Related development

- Short Calcutta
- Short L.17 Scylla
