= Short S.8 Calcutta =

1928 flying boat airliner model by Short Brothers

S.8 Calcutta
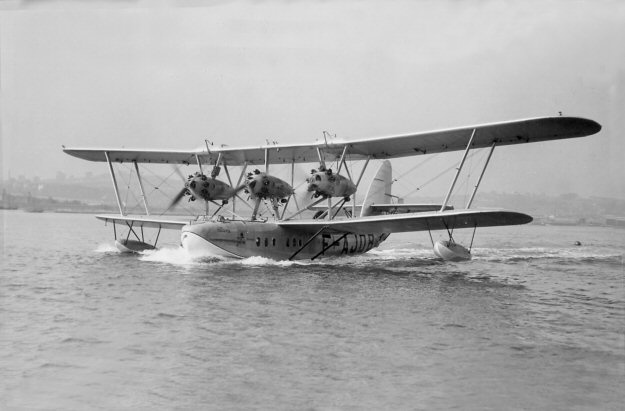
- View shows the pilot in the open cockpit.

General information
- Type: Biplane airliner flying boat
- Manufacturer: Short Brothers
- Primary user: Imperial Airways
- Number built: 7

History
- Introduction date: 1928
- First flight: 14 February 1928
- Developed from: Short Singapore
- Variants: Short Rangoon; Short Kent; Breguet 521

The Short Calcutta or S.8 was a civilian biplane airliner flying boat made by Short Brothers.

== Design and development ==
The Calcutta biplane flying boat originated from an Imperial Airways requirement to service the Mediterranean legs of its services to and from India. Derived from the Short Singapore military flying boat, the Calcutta was noteworthy for being the first British stressed skin, metal-hulled flying boat but was preceded by the German Zeppelin-Lindau Rs.IV. It was equipped with three Bristol Jupiter engines mounted between the wings. The two pilots flew the plane from an open cockpit while the radio operator shared the main cabin with 15 passengers.

== Operational history ==
The S.8 Calcutta made its first flight on 14 February 1928, having been launched the previous day and left at its mooring overnight to assess the hull for signs of leakage. Shorts' Chief Test Pilot, John Lankester Parker was at the controls, with Major Herbert G. Brackley of Imperial Airways as co-pilot. On 15 March 1928, this aircraft (registered as G-EBVG) was delivered by Parker and Brackley to the Marine Aircraft Experimental Establishment, Felixstowe, for its airworthiness and sea handling checks; these were successfully completed on 27 July of the same year and the aircraft was flown back to Shorts on the same day. G-EBVG was handed over to Imperial Airways on 9 August 1928.

The S.8 Calcutta was introduced in 1928 and was used by Imperial Airways flying the Mediterranean-to-Karachi leg of the Britain-to-India route.

A total of seven aircraft were built. A military version of the Calcutta, originally known as the Calcutta (Service type), was built as the Short Rangoon. In 1924, a Calcutta was purchased by the French Breguet Company from which they developed a military version for the French Navy known as the Breguet S.8/2, which was similar to the Rangoon version. Four aircraft were built under licence by Breguet at Le Havre. Breguet later developed an improved version, the Breguet 521 Bizerte.

On 1 August 1928, Parker, accompanied by Oswald Short, flew G-EBVG to Westminster, setting it down on the Thames between Vauxhall and Lambeth Bridges; it was moored off the Albert Embankment for three days for inspection by Members of Parliament (including the then Chancellor of the Exchequer, Winston Churchill), members of the House of Lords and others.

== Accidents and incidents ==
The City of Rome (registration G-AADN) made a forced landing in high winds and poor weather in the Ligurian Sea off La Spezia, Italy, during a scheduled passenger flight from Naples International Airport in Naples, Italy, to Genoa Cristoforo Colombo Airport outside Genoa, Italy, on 26 October 1929. It sank during efforts to tow it to shore, killing all seven people on board.

The City of Khartoum (G-AASJ) suffered a catastrophic failure of all three engines shortly before the end of its flight between Crete and Alexandria, Egypt, just after nightfall on 31 December 1935. The pilot was the only survivor; nine passengers and three crew were killed either by the impact with water or by drowning when the aircraft was overwhelmed by heavy waves. An inquiry by the British Air Ministry found that the carburettors had been altered in a way which increased fuel consumption, resulting in the aircraft running out of fuel.

The City of Alexandria (G-EBVG) was destroyed in a storm while moored at Mirabella, Crete, during a night stop on 28 December 1936.

The remaining two airliners, City of Athens (G-EBVH) AND City of Salonika (G-AATZ) became obsolete and were withdrawn in 1937.

== Operators ==
United Kingdom

- Imperial Airways

== Specifications ==
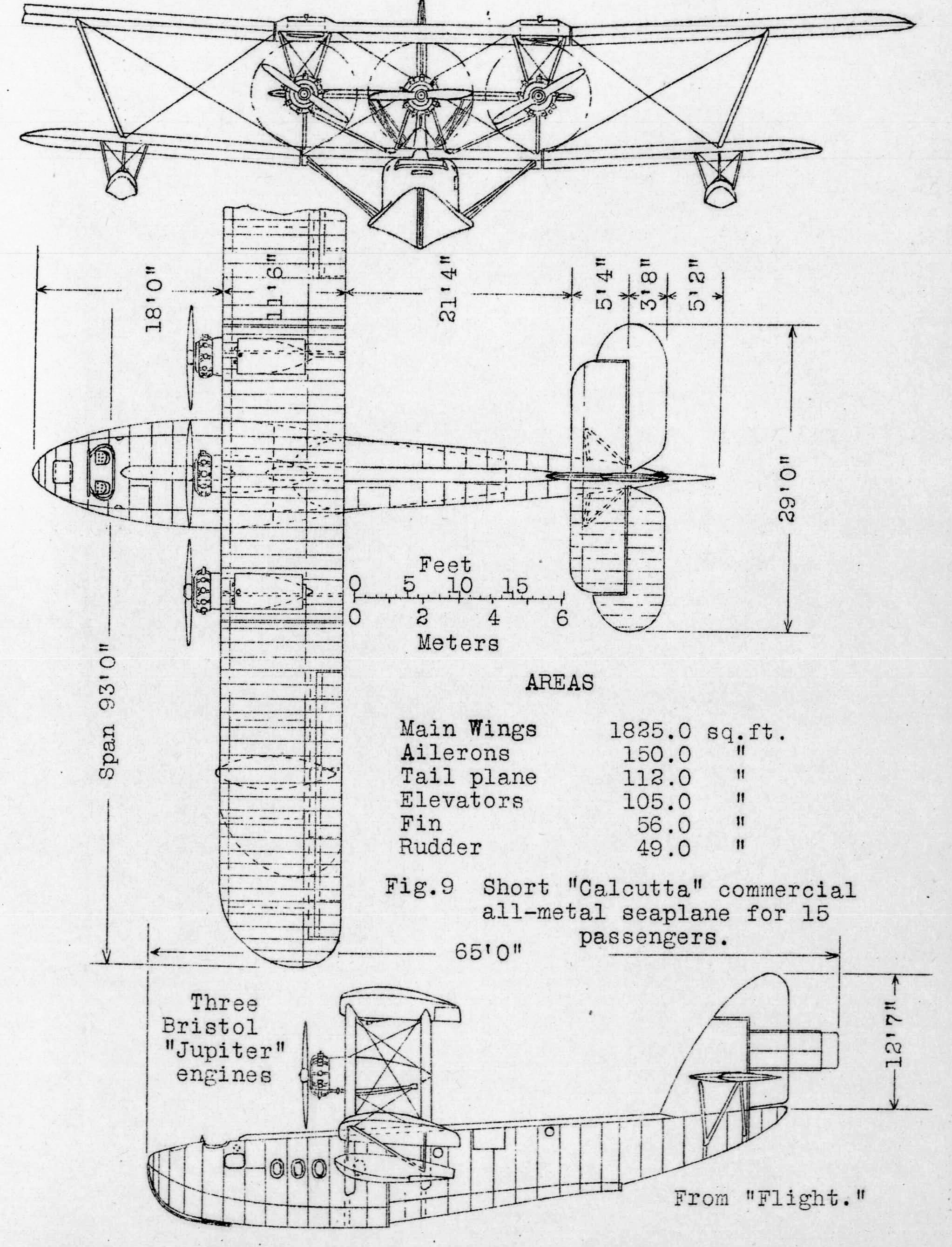
Short Calcutta 3-view drawing from NACA Aircraft Circular No.68

Data from British Civil Aircraft 1919-1972:Volume III

General characteristics

- Crew: 3
- Capacity: 15 passengers
- Length: 66 ft 9 in (20.35 m)
- Wingspan: 93 ft 0 in (28.35 m)
- Height: 23 ft 9 in (7.24 m)
- Wing area: 1,825 sq ft (169.5 m^{2})
- Empty weight: 13,845 lb (6,280 kg)
- Max takeoff weight: 22,500 lb (10,206 kg)
- Fuel capacity: 480 imp gal (580 US gal; 2,200 L)
- Powerplant: 3 × Bristol Jupiter IXF 9-cylinder radial engine, 540 hp (400 kW) each

Performance

- Maximum speed: 118 mph (190 km/h, 103 kn)
- Cruise speed: 97 mph (156 km/h, 84 kn)
- Range: 650 mi (1,050 km, 560 nmi)
- Service ceiling: 13,500 ft (4,100 m)
- Rate of climb: 750 ft/min (3.8 m/s)

== See also ==
Related development

- Short Cromarty
- Short S.2
- Short Singapore
- Saunders Severn
- Short Rangoon
- Short Kent
- Kawanishi H3K
- Breguet 521 Bizerte

== Bibliography ==
- Barnes, C.H. (1967). Shorts Aircraft since 1900. London: Putnam.
- Barnes, C. H.; James, D. N. (1989). Shorts Aircraft since 1900. Putnam: Putnam. ISBN 0-85177-819-4.
- Bousquet, Gérard (2013). French Flying Boats of WW II. Sandomierz, Poland: Stratus. ISBN 978-83-63678-06-7.
- The Illustrated Encyclopedia of Aircraft (Part Work 1982-1985). London: Orbis Publishing, 1985.
- Jackson, A. J. (1988). British Civil Aircraft 1919-1972: Volume III. London: Putnam. ISBN 0-85177-818-6.
- Lacaze, Henri (2016). Les avions Louis Breguet Paris [The Aircraft of Louis Breguet, Paris] (in French). Vol. 2: le règne du monoplan. Le Vigen, France. ISBN 978-2-914017-89-3.
