= Hambling baronets =

Baronetcy in the Baronetage of the United Kingdom

The Hambling Baronetcy, of Yoxford in the County of Suffolk, is a title in the Baronetage of the United Kingdom. It was created on 27 February 1924 for Sir Herbert Hambling, Kt., Deputy Chairman of Barclays Bank and a Financial Member of the Ministry of Munitions from 1914 to 1919.

== Hambling baronets, of Yoxford (1924) ==
- Sir (Henry) Herbert Hambling, 1st Baronet (1857–1932)
- Sir (Herbert) Guy Musgrave Hambling, 2nd Baronet (1883–1966)
- Sir (Herbert) Hugh Hambling, 3rd Baronet (3 August 1919 – 6 May 2010)
- Sir (Herbert) Peter Hugh Hambling, 4th Baronet (born 6 September 1953)

The heir apparent is the present holder's eldest son Colin Hugh Hambling (born 1991).

== Arms ==
Coat of arms of Hambling baronets
Crest A falcon supporting with the dexter claw a distaff Proper and charged on the body with a bezant. Escutcheon Argent a sword erect Sable between two flaunches Azure each charged with a hank of cotton of the field. Motto Discern & Decide
