= Bristol Type 92 =

Type 92

General information
- Type: Research
- National origin: United Kingdom
- Manufacturer: Bristol Aeroplane Co. Ltd.
- Designer: Frank Barnwell
- Number built: 1

History
- First flight: 13 November 1925
- Retired: 1928

The Bristol Type 92, sometimes known as the Laboratory biplane, was an aircraft built by the Bristol Aeroplane Company to address the differences between wind tunnel cowling models and full scale cowling for radial engines and was designed as a scaled-up version of a wind tunnel model aircraft. One was built and flew in the mid-1920s.

== Development ==
In the development of the Bristol Badger in 1919, Bristol's chief designer Frank Barnwell had noted discrepancies between wind tunnel model tests and full-size aircraft, particularly in the failure to predict the Badger's lateral instability. He had responded by building the Badger X which had standard Badger wings combined with a very simple fuselage, intended to look like a scaled-up wind tunnel model for comparison. The Badger went on to become a testbed for Bristol's Jupiter radial engine in a variety of cowlings. Once again, it was difficult to extrapolate from wind tunnel measurements on cowling aerodynamics and engine cooling to the full scale, so that the cooling behaviour of cowlings that were aerodynamically efficient was hard to predict. Cooling difficulties were experienced with the Badger and later Jupiter-powered Bristol types like the Bullfinch and Ten-seater.

Barnwell's response was again to design a full-scale aircraft which had the simplifications of a typical wind tunnel model, to which could be fitted any of several cowlings over the Jupiter engine; the Type 92 was the result. It was a two-bay biplane without stagger or sweep on the equal span, square-tipped wings. These and the tail unit, which was also very rectangular and simple, were fabric-covered steel strip and tube structures. Part of the Type 92's odd appearance came from the wish to minimise wing-fuselage aerodynamic interactions. To achieve this, the vertical gap between the wings was large: at 9 ft (2.7 m) it was 25% of the span. The undercarriage had a wide track and was a single axle arrangement mounted below the ends of the inner interplane struts.

The fuselage was also simple, the structural part being a plywood-covered box girder about 2 ft (61 cm) square from the nose to aft of the second cockpit, where it tapered in plan only to an edge at the tail. Two streamlined pylons joined the wings to the box, above and below, carrying the fuselage at mid gap. For the aerodynamic investigations, the untapered part of the fuselage could be contained in circular fairings of different diameters; originally a range of five sizes was planned, but to reduce cost only the smallest (3 ft (91 cm)) and largest (5 ft (150 cm)) were flown. Since the diameter of the Jupiter was about 4 ft 7 in (1.40 m), the cylinder heads were well exposed with the smaller fairing and enclosed by the larger.

== Operational history ==
Powered by a Jupiter V engine, the Type 92 first flew from Filton on 13 November 1925. It was ungainly in the air, was never registered nor flown far from Filton, but it was in use for more than two years, mostly with the 3 ft (0.91 m) fairing. The larger fairing was fitted in 1928, but not long after, the undercarriage was damaged in a heavy landing and the Type 92 did not fly again.

By the end of the 1920s, the problem of cowling radial engines was beginning to be mastered, though it is not clear how much the Type 92 contributed to the solution. In 1929, the Townend ring appeared, improving the airflow but open enough not to impede cooling; in 1928-9, NACA was releasing and applying the results of very successful tests on closely cowled engines in the 20 ft (6.1 m) diameter Propeller Research Tunnel (PRT). The PRT's ability to test full scale cowlings meant that they could be developed under ground-based laboratory conditions, rather than flying them on a laboratory aircraft, and the difficult problems of trying to scale low Reynolds number model data to realistic values were avoided.

== Specifications ==
Data from Barnes 1970, p. 196

General characteristics

- Crew: two
- Length: 29 ft 4 in (8.94 m)
- Wingspan: 36 ft 0 in (10.97 m)
- Height: 13 ft 0 in (3.96 m)
- Wing area: 432 sq ft (40.13 m^{2})
- Empty weight: 2,200 lb (998 kg)
- Gross weight: 3,400 lb (1,542 kg)
- Powerplant: 1 × Bristol Jupiter VI nine-cylinder air cooled radial , 450 hp (335 kW)

Performance

- Maximum speed: 132 mph (212 km/h, 115 kn)
- Range: 4,924 mi (7,925 km, 4,279 nmi)
- Service ceiling: 26,000 ft (7,900 m)
