= Boulton Paul Partridge =

Biplane fighter

Partridge
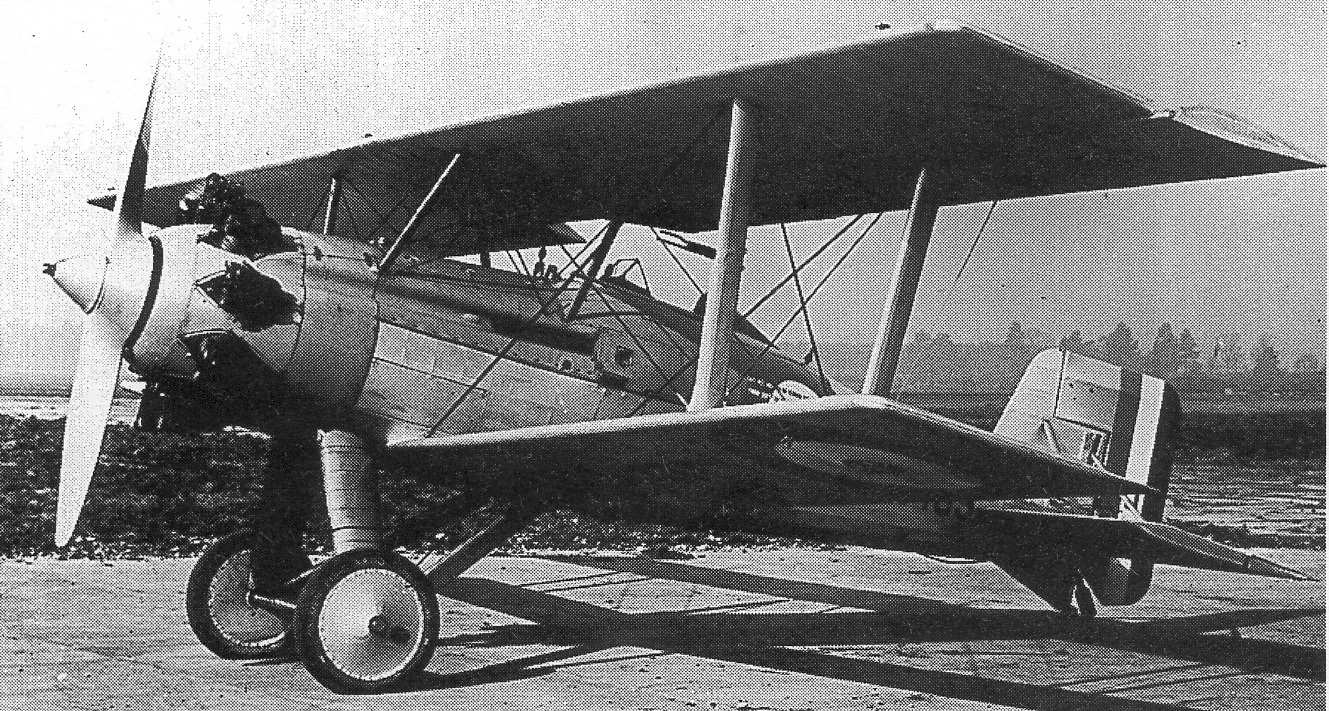

General information
- Type: Single seat fighter
- National origin: United Kingdom
- Manufacturer: Boulton & Paul Ltd
- Designer: John North
- Number built: 1

History
- First flight: early 1928

The Boulton & Paul P.33 Partridge was a single seat single-engined biplane fighter designed to an Air Ministry specification. One prototype was ordered and built for trials in 1928, but it was not put into production.

== Design and development ==
When Air Ministry specification F.9/26 was issued in 1926, calling for a replacement for the RAF's numerous Siskin and Gamecock fighters, many manufacturers responded and nine were rewarded with prototype contracts. Boulton & Paul, who had never built a production fighter aircraft of their own design and had only designed one single-engined fighter before (the Bobolink) was one of the successful tenderers with their P.33 Partridge. The company was an early adopter of metal airframe construction and the Partridge was built this way, with many of its structural components common to the RAF's Boulton Paul Sidestrand bomber.

The Partridge was a single bay biplane with the unswept constant chord square tipped wings characteristic of Boulton & Paul at this time. There was slight stagger and only the lower wing, smaller in span and chord, had dihedral. The interplane struts leaned outwards markedly and the centre section struts more so. Initially there were ailerons only on the upper wings, but soon they were added to the lower wing with a noticeable vertical interconnecting rigid link. Like the rest of the aircraft the wings were fabric covered.

The fuselage had an oval cross section. A large spinner blended smoothly into the engine cowling, though the nine cylinder heads of the 440 hp (328 kW) Bristol Jupiter VII engine protruded without further shrouding; a Townend ring was discussed but not fitted. Two Vickers machine guns were mounted on the fuselage immediately behind the engine and firing through the propeller and between the cylinder heads. The maximum fuselage diameter was just behind the wing at the single cockpit, giving the aircraft a slightly humped appearance. The pilot had a clear forward view under the upper wing and a trailing edge cut-out helped his upward view. The fin and the strut braced tailplanes were both rather rectangular and low aspect ratio. Both the rudder and elevators were horn balanced, the latter with balance surfaces extending beyond the tailplane. The undercarriage had a single axle and was mounted on vee struts. There was a faired tail skid.

The Partridge first flew in early in 1928 and appeared at the Hendon RAF display that July. Competitive trials between the contestants for F.9/26 began in January at RAF Martlesham Heath. The Hawker Hawfinch and the eventual winner, the Bristol Bulldog stood out from the others in terms of handling. These two and the Partridge had similar performance figures, with the Bulldog 7 mph (11 km/h) faster than the Partridge but having a lower service ceiling. The major failure of the Partridge was its poor longitudinal stability and control, which led to heavy stick forces and made aerobatics difficult. No further orders were placed. Some modifications were made to the original machine during the trials, notably an enlarged cockpit to assist a pilot who was baling out, and this variation became known as the Mk II. Boulton & Paul had always intended the Partridge to be powered by the new but unavailable Bristol Mercury and the designation Mk III was reserved for this unbuilt version.

== Specifications ==
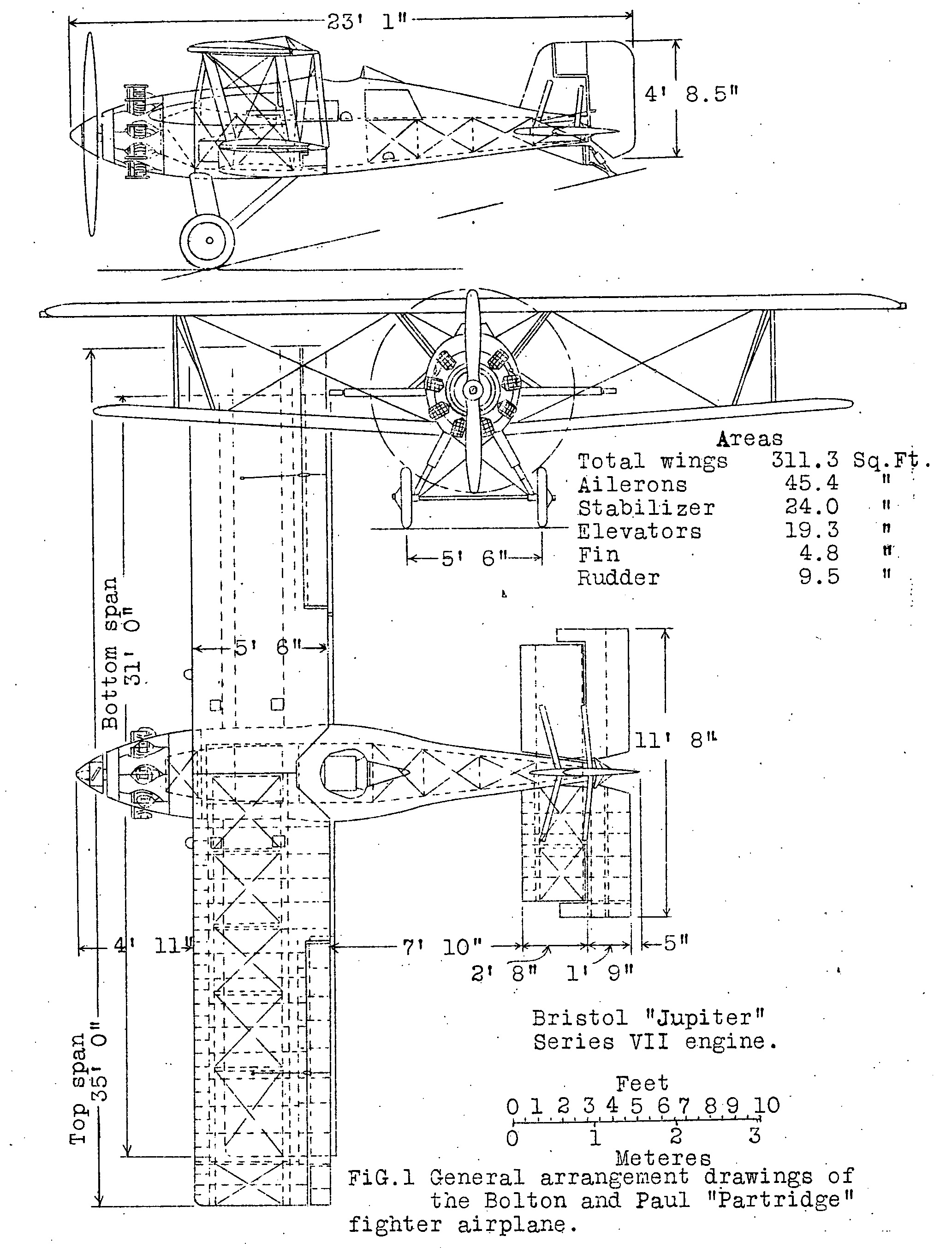
Boulton Paul Partridge 3-view drawing from NACA Aircraft Circular No.90

Data from Brew.

General characteristics

- Crew: 1
- Length: 23 ft 1 in (7.04 m)
- Upper wingspan: 35 ft 0 in (10.67 m)
- Lower wingspan: 31 ft 0 in (9.45 m)
- Height: 11 ft 0 in (3.35 m)
- Wing area: 311 sq ft (28.9 m^{2})
- Empty weight: 2,021 lb (917 kg)
- Gross weight: 3,097 lb (1,405 kg)
- Powerplant: 1 × Bristol Jupiter VII 9-cylinder air-cooled radial engine, 440 hp (330 kW)

Performance

- Maximum speed: 167 mph (269 km/h, 145 kn) at 10,000 ft (3,000 m)
- Service ceiling: 28,950 ft (8,820 m)
- Time to altitude: 6 min 30 s to 10,000 ft (3,000 m)

Armament

- Guns: 2 × 0.303 (7.7 mm) nose mounted Vickers machine guns
