= Type 79 =

Type 79 may refer to:

- Type 69/79 Chinese tank
- Type 79 100 mm naval gun
- Type 79 Jyu-MAT
- Type 79 rifle, a Chinese clone of the Dragunov sniper rifle
- Type 79 submachine gun
- Bristol Ten-seater, variant Type 79
- Type 79 radar, the Royal Navy's first operational radar
