= Type 92 =

Type 92 may refer to:

== Weapons ==
- Type 92 machine gun
- Type 92 Heavy Machine Gun
- 7.7mm Type 92 machine-gun cartridge
- Type 92 Battalion Gun
- Type 92 10 cm Cannon
- Type 92 torpedo
- Type 92 Handgun

== Armored cars ==
- Type 92 variant of the WZ551 armored personnel carrier
- Type 92 Jyu-Sokosha armored car

== Airplanes ==
- Kawasaki Type 92 biplane
- Bristol Type 92 biplane
- Mitsubishi 2MR8 reconnaissance aircraft
- Mitsubishi Ki-20 heavy bomber

== Other ==
- The NSB Class 92 diesel railway multiple unit
