= Short S.6 Sturgeon =

Prototype single-engined biplane naval reconnaissance aircraft

Sturgeon

General information
- Type: Prototype naval reconnaissance aircraft
- National origin: United Kingdom
- Manufacturer: Short Brothers
- Number built: 2

History
- First flight: 22 June 1927

The Short S.6 Sturgeon was a prototype single-engined biplane naval reconnaissance aircraft, built to an Air Ministry specification but mostly intended as a demonstrator of the corrosion resistance of duralumin aircraft structures. Two were made.

== Design and development ==
Following the all-metal Silver Streak of 1920, Short Brothers produced a series of military aircraft with duralumin monocoque fuselages and wings which were at first duralumin covered, then fabric. The last of this series was the Short S.6 Sturgeon, a three-seat fleet reconnaissance aircraft designed to meet Air Ministry specification 1/24. The Air Ministry ordered two prototypes without raising hopes of series production. Nonetheless, Shorts were keen to demonstrate once again the corrosion resistance of treated duralumin.

The Sturgeon was a singled-engined, three-seat single-bay biplane, with wings of mild sweep. They had parallel chord and equal span, but the lower one had a slightly smaller chord than the upper, giving the appearance of stagger though the trailing edges were in line. Another consequence of the difference in chord was that the front steel interplane struts leant slightly forwards, whilst the rear one was upright. Apart from their fabric covering the wings were entirely duralumin structures. There were push rod connected ailerons on both top and bottom wings. The Sturgeon was a ship-board aircraft and so its wings folded to save space. A thickened centre section held fuel tanks and was supported by two sets of roughly N-shaped struts to the upper fuselage. A wide, V-shape cut out in the upper trailing edge went forward to the rear spar to enhance the view from the cockpits, which was helped by the wide interplane gap that put the upper wing well clear of the fuselage. The lower wing was also braced near its root by a pair of struts from each wing spar, fore and aft, to a common point on the fuselage above the leading edge of the wing.

The fuselage was built from a pair of duralumin monocoques, bolted together. Each was constructed using Shorts' established method of plate riveted to oval, L-section frames and with longitudinal stiffeners. The Sturgeon was powered by an uncowled Bristol Jupiter VI radial engine, driving a two-bladed propeller and with exhausts leading back over the lower wing. There were three open cockpits, one behind the other. The pilot sat in front, behind the leading edge with the navigator cum bomb-aimer close behind him. The latter's position was just at the wing cut-out; he also had a bombsight hatch in the floor. A little further back was the radio operator/rear gunner, clear of the trailing edge. The fuselage diameter decreased to the tail, where a squat fin carried a tall, horn balanced rudder which extended down to the bottom of the fuselage. The tailplane was strut supported from below and sat on the fin just above the fuselage; it was straight edged and carried unbalanced, split elevators. One problem in adapting the monocoque method to a service aircraft was that the numerous openings and attachment brackets all needed local reinforcement, leading to a considerable weight gain.

Though the Sturgeon was constructed as a landplane, it did all of its flying on floats. These were long and joined to each other with a pair of transverse horizontal struts. There were three further struts per float to the fuselage:one from the forward part rearward to the engine bulkhead and two from a common point further aft to the two wing spars, joining the lower wing struts from below.

The first of the two Sturgeons made its maiden flight on 22 June 1927 in the hands of John Lankester Parker. Some extension of the wing root fillets followed early flights; by January 1928 both aircraft were flying. Despite the higher than expected weight, the seaplanes performed well on the water and in the air. As Shorts had intended, they did demonstrate the resistance of duralumin aircraft to the elements; before its delivery to the Marine Aircraft Experimental Establishment at Felixstowe, the second Sturgeon had been moored out on the Medway, near Shorts' Rochester base for three weeks in February weather, protected only by cockpit and engine covers. Their final fate is not known.

== Specifications (seaplane) ==
Data from Barnes & James 1989, p. 216

General characteristics

- Crew: 3
- Length: 32 ft 6 in (9.91 m)
- Wingspan: 45 ft 11 in (14.00 m)
- Wing area: 650 sq ft (60 m^{2})
- Gross weight: 6,213 lb (2,818 kg)
- Powerplant: 1 × Bristol Jupiter VI 9-cylinder radial, 520 hp (390 kW)

Performance

- Maximum speed: 115 mph (185 km/h, 100 kn)

Armament

- Guns: 1× 0.303 in (7.7 mm) Vickers machine gun firing forward from blister on the port side of the engine and 1× 0.303 in (7.7 mm) Lewis gun on Scarff ring in rear cockpit

== Sources ==
- Barnes, C.H.; James, D. N. (1989). Shorts Aircraft since 1900. London: Putnam Publishing. ISBN 0-87021-662-7.
