= Boulton Paul P.32 =

British three-engine biplane

P.32
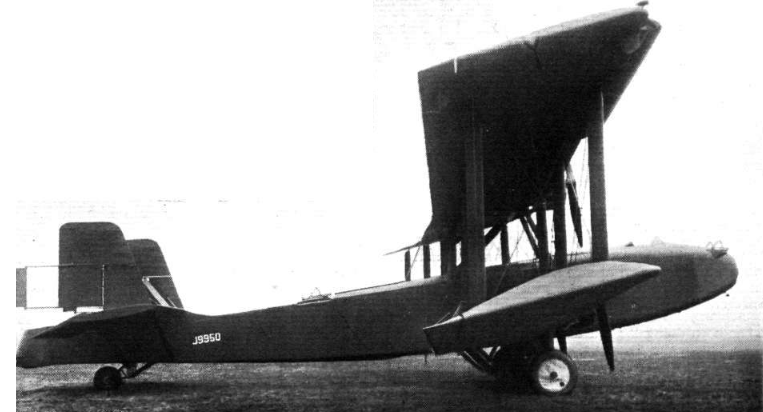

General information
- Type: Long range night bomber
- National origin: United Kingdom
- Manufacturer: Boulton & Paul Ltd
- Designer: John North
- Number built: 1

History
- First flight: 23 October 1931

The sole Boulton & Paul P.32 was a British three-engined biplane built to an Air Ministry specification for a long range night bomber. A lack of engine availability slowed construction and by the time it went for tests the thinking on bomber types had moved on.

== Design and development ==
The Air Ministry specification B.22/27 of 1927 called for a three-engined long range night bomber. Boulton & Paul tendered the P.32 and obtained an order for one prototype. de Havilland also received a prototype order for their DH.72, an aircraft of similar size and layout. Both were twin finned three bay biplanes with two engines on the lower wings and one on the upper centre section. The centre engine position was driven by the specification's requirement for a clear view from a bomb aimer's position in the nose.

The P.32 was a metal framed aircraft, using steel for the main members and duralumin elsewhere. Its unstaggered, foldable wings were straight edged with constant chord and rectangular tips, a Boulton & Paul characteristic seen also in, for example the Sidestrand. Both wings carried ailerons, but only the lower one had dihedral. Two of the uncowled three 550 hp (410 kW) Bristol Jupiter XF radial engines were mounted on the top of the lower wing just within the inner bay, their three-bladed propellers close to the fuselage sides. The third engine was similarly mounted on the upper wing, above the fuselage; the wide interplane gap just gave airscrew clearance. These engines were replaced with 575 hp (429 kW) Jupiter XFBMs, enclosed in Townend rings and driving four bladed airscrews as soon as these medium supercharged models became available.

The square section, slab sided fuselage held either four or five crew, though more seats The specification called for a gunner/bomb aimer in the nose. In the P.32 he could use the bombsight when sitting facing forward and, by rotating his seat, take up his third role as navigator at a chart table. There was a walkway aft, which passed in turn the pilot's and second pilot's open cockpits in tandem on the port side, the wireless/camera operator's internal position near the leading edge, the dorsal gunner's cockpit and the tail gunner's station in the extreme, slightly drooped tail. The second pilot was optional; he might be an instructor or a relief. The dorsal gun could be manned either by the wireless operator or the tail gunner. Each of the three gun positions had a Lewis gun on a Scarff ring. Bombs were held in a recessed but not enclosed bay below the fuselage; more could be mounted below the inner wing.

The monoplane horizontal stabiliser carried servo assisted elevators and a pair of fins with horn balanced rudders. These were also servo assisted, with the servo surfaces mounted well behind the rudders' trailing edges on outriggers. The main undercarriage was unusual in that on either side pairs of wheels were fitted on a long axle so that the inner one was close to the fuselage and the outer one beyond the engine and inner bay. The P.32 was initially fitted with a pair of tailskids, soon replaced with a tailwheel with a little faired leg.

Like its de Havilland competitor, the P.32's completion was delayed by a series of design changes requested by the Air Ministry but especially by the unavailability of engines from Bristol. The Bristol Mercury Vs originally specified were never fitted. It first flew at Mousehold Heath on 23 October 1931, joining the DH.72 for evaluation by the Aeroplane and Armament Experimental Establishment (A&AEE) at RAF Martlesham Heath that November. It appeared at the Hendon display in 1932, painted in the standard dull green, but it seems the Ministry saw no future for this class of intermediate weight bombers, for none were ordered and no performance figures from Martlesham tests have survived for either the P.32 or the DH.72.

== Specifications ==
Data from

General characteristics

- Crew: 4–5
- Length: 69 ft 0 in (21.03 m)
- Wingspan: 100 ft 0 in (30.48 m)
- Height: 21 ft 0 in (6.40 m)
- Wing area: 2,090 sq ft (194 m^{2})
- Gross weight: 22,700 lb (10,297 kg)
- Powerplant: 3 × Bristol Jupiter XFBM 9-cylinder radial engines, 575 hp (429 kW) each

Armament

- Guns: 3×Lewis guns on Scarff rings in nose, dorsal and tail positions
- Bombs:
  - 4× 550 lb (250 kg) or 520 lb (240 kg) bombs or 6× 250 lb (110 kg) bombs in semi-recessed bomb bay and
  - 6× 120 lb (54 kg) bombs under wings

== See also ==
Aircraft of comparable role, configuration, and era

- de Havilland DH.72
