= Bristol Jupiter Fighter =

British fighter (1924 - 1934)

Jupiter Fighter
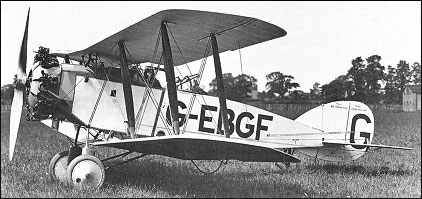

General information
- Type: Fighter/Trainer
- Manufacturer: Bristol Aeroplane Company
- Number built: 26

History
- Introduction date: 1924
- First flight: June 1923
- Retired: 1934
- Developed from: Bristol F.2 Fighter

The Bristol Type 76 Jupiter Fighter and Type 89 Trainer were derivatives of the British fighter of the First World War (the F.2 Fighter), powered by Bristol Jupiter radial engines. While unsuccessful as a fighter, it was used as an advanced trainer aircraft between 1924 and 1933.

== Design and development ==
In order to demonstrate their new Jupiter engine in an inexpensive yet relatively high performance aircraft, the Bristol Aeroplane Company authorised the conversion of three war-surplus F.2 airframes to use the Jupiter, to create the Type 76 Jupiter Fighter, which it was also hoped to sell as a fighter to foreign air forces.

The first of these three aircraft flew in June 1923. While the engine installation proved satisfactory, as the Type 76 had the same fuel capacity as the F.2, the increased fuel consumption of the Jupiter compared with the F.2's original Rolls-Royce Falcon meant that the aircraft had inadequate range for use as a fighter, while the slipstream over the observer's cockpit meant that the observer could not use his .303 in (7.7 mm) Lewis Gun. Because of these flaws, no more Type 76s were built after the initial three.

While unsuitable as a fighter, the success of the engine installation of the Jupiter Fighter resulted in the decision to produce an advanced trainer version, to supplement the Siddeley Puma-engined Bristol Tourers already in use in this role. The result of this combination was the Type 89 Trainer, a total of 23 of which were produced.

== Operational history ==
While the first Jupiter Fighter was evaluated at Martlesham Heath and found wanting, being lost on 23 November 1923 when the engine seized at high altitude, the second was sent to Sweden for evaluation, where it coped excellently with the extreme cold of the Swedish winter, with the Jupiter, using normal fuels and winter motor oil, operating without trouble in temperatures which normally caused engine oil to freeze in hours. The second Type 76 was therefore purchased by the Swedish Air Force, who operated it from May 1924 until 1935, when it was sold to a private buyer, finally being written off in 1936. The final Type 76 was used as a testbed for a high compression version of the Jupiter intended for use at high altitudes, which was fitted with a bi-fuel system to allow use of alcohol at low altitudes, then switching to normal petrol once the aircraft had reached sufficient altitude to prevent premature detonation (Engine knocking). This system was rejected in favour of supercharging.

The Jupiter-powered advanced trainers entered service with the Bristol-operated Reserve Flying School at Filton in 1924. They were also used by the Reserve Flying School at Renfrew operated by William Beardmore and Company, with the Beardmore-owned aircraft being powered by Jupiter VI engines, while the Filton-based aircraft were powered by surplus Jupiter IV engines, as an economy measure. They remained in use at Renfrew until 1928, and at Filton until 1933, when they were replaced by Hawker Hart trainers and scrapped.

== Variants ==
Type 76
Prototype Bristol Jupiter Fighter. One built.

Type 76B
Second prototype Jupiter Fighter - sold to Sweden, otherwise known as Swedish Fighter

Type 76A
Third Jupiter Fighter - used for testing experimental bi-fuel Jupiter. Later converted to Type 89

Type 89
Jupiter-powered advanced trainer. Nine built.

Type 89A
Modified trainer with new, plywood-covered monocoque fuselage. 15 built (including one built at Renfrew from spare parts and salvaged components from crashed aircraft)

== Operators ==
Sweden

- Swedish Air Force

United Kingdom

- Filton Reserve Flying School
- Renfrew Reserve Flying School

== Specifications (Type 89) ==
Data from British Civil Aircraft since 1919 Volume 1

General characteristics

- Crew: 2
- Length: 25 ft 0 in (7.62 m)
- Wingspan: 39 ft 3 in (11.96 m)
- Height: 9 ft 0 in (2.74 m)
- Wing area: 405 sq ft (37.6 m^{2})
- Empty weight: 2,326 lb (1,055 kg)
- Gross weight: 3,250 lb (1,474 kg)
- Powerplant: 1 × Bristol Jupiter IV 9-cylinder air-cooled radial piston engine, 320 hp (240 kW) (de-rated)
- Propellers: 2-bladed fixed-pitch propeller

Performance

- Maximum speed: 110 mph (180 km/h, 96 kn)
- Cruise speed: 94 mph (151 km/h, 82 kn)
- Range: 340 mi (550 km, 300 nmi)
- Service ceiling: 22,150 ft (6,750 m) (Jupiter Fighter)
- Wing loading: 8.02 lb/sq ft (39.2 kg/m^{2})
- Power/mass: 0.098 hp/lb (0.161 kW/kg)
