= Yakovlev AIR-7 =

AIR-7
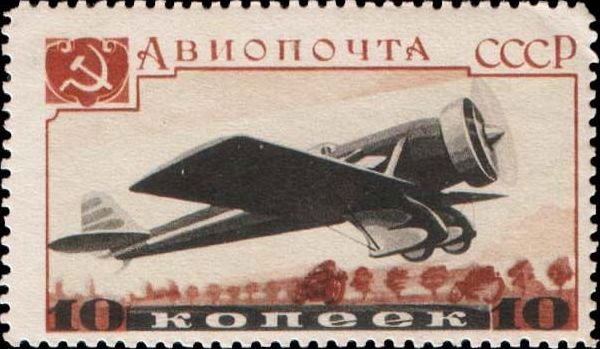

General information
- Type: Sport aircraft
- National origin: Soviet Union
- Manufacturer: Yakovlev
- Designer: Alexander Sergeyevich Yakovlev
- Number built: 1

History
- First flight: 19 November 1932

The Yakovlev AIR-7 was a prototype Soviet high performance light aircraft of the 1930s. It was a two-seat single-engined monoplane, which demonstrated excellent performance during testing. After the prototype almost crashed as a result of flutter, its designer, Alexander Sergeyevich Yakovlev suffered temporary disgrace and no production followed.

== Design and development ==
In April 1931, Alexander Sergeyevich Yakovlev, freshly graduated from the air force academy, was assigned as an engineering supervisor to State Aviation Factory No 39 (GAZ-39) where the designer Nikolai Nikolaevich Polikarpov worked as an NKVD prisoner. (While the factory included an "Internal Prison" which housed Polikarpov and many other designers, Yakovlev was a normal employee at the factory and not a prisoner). GAZ-39 specialised in production of Polikarpov's I-5 fighter, a biplane powered by a license-built Bristol Jupiter engine and Yakovlev realised that a monoplane light aircraft designed around the Jupiter engine of the I-5 and carefully streamlined could reach a higher speed than the I-5 while carrying a passenger.

Despite disapproval from the management of GAZ-39, Yakovlev received funding from Osoaviakhim, the Soviet paramilitary sports society, and assembled a small team within the factory to design and build the new aircraft, the AIR-7. (Note: Early Yakovlev designed aircraft were designated AIR in honour of Alexei Rykov, the Chairman of the Council of People's Commissars)

The resulting aircraft was a carefully streamlined two-seat tractor low-wing monoplane of mixed construction. Its fuselage was built of welded mild steel tubing, with dural panelling forward of the cockpit and fabric covering aft, and accommodated the pilot and passenger in tandem under an enclosed canopy. The wood and fabric wing was braced with cables and overwing steel struts to the fuselage, enabling a thinner wing to be used. The aircraft was fitted with a fixed conventional landing gear, with the mainwheels enclosed in trouser fairings to reduce drag, with a sprung metal tailskid. Powerplant was a single Shvetsov M-22, a license-built Bristol Jupiter radial engine enclosed by a Townend ring, driving a two-bladed propeller.

== Operational history ==
The AIR-7 made its maiden flight on 19 November 1932. It reached a speed of 335 kilometres per hour (208 mph), a Soviet airspeed record, on its second flight the next day, despite carrying Yakovlev as a passenger. On 23 November, (Note: While Gordon et al. state that this accident occurred in November 1932, and that the aircraft was afterwards modified and flown again, other references state that the accident happened in early 1934, after the aircraft was modified, and that it never flew again.) the AIR-7 was being demonstrated in front of senior officers of the Soviet Air Forces when its starboard aileron broke off in flight, apparently the result of flutter, and the test pilot made a forced landing. Yakovlev took responsibility for the accident, stating that an error had been made in calculating the strength of the aileron hinge. The commission investigating the accident, which refused to listen to any evidence from Yakovlev, concluded that Yakovlev should be prohibited from carrying out design work and should not receive an award for which he had been recommended. He and his team were sacked from OKB-39. Yakovlev eventually used his connections in the Communist Party to gain permission to restart aircraft design work, setting up what became the Yakovlev OKB in a derelict Moscow bed factory in 1934.

The AIR-7 was repaired after the accident, fitted with strengthened aileron hinges and modified undercarriage fairings. So modified, it set a new national speed record of 332 kilometres per hour (206 mph) on 25 September 1933.

== Specifications ==
Data from OKB Yakovlev: A History of the Design Bureau and its Aircraft

General characteristics

- Crew: one
- Capacity: one passenger
- Length: 7.80 m (25 ft 7 in)
- Wingspan: 11.00 m (36 ft 1 in)
- Height: 3.10 m (10 ft 2 in)
- Wing area: 19.40 m^{2} (208.8 sq ft)
- Airfoil: Göttingen-436
- Empty weight: 900 kg (1,984 lb)
- Gross weight: 1,400 kg (3,086 lb)
- Powerplant: 1 × Shvetsov M-22 9-cylinder air-cooled radial engine, 360 kW (480 hp)

Performance

- Maximum speed: 332 km/h (206 mph, 179 kn)
- Range: 270 km (170 mi, 150 nmi) (normal range)
- Ferry range: 1,300 km (810 mi, 700 nmi) (maximum range)
- Service ceiling: 5,800 m (19,000 ft)
- Time to altitude: 3 min to 1,000 m (3,300 ft)
