= Short Springbok =

Two-seat, all-metal reconnaissance biplane

Springbok I / II / Chamois
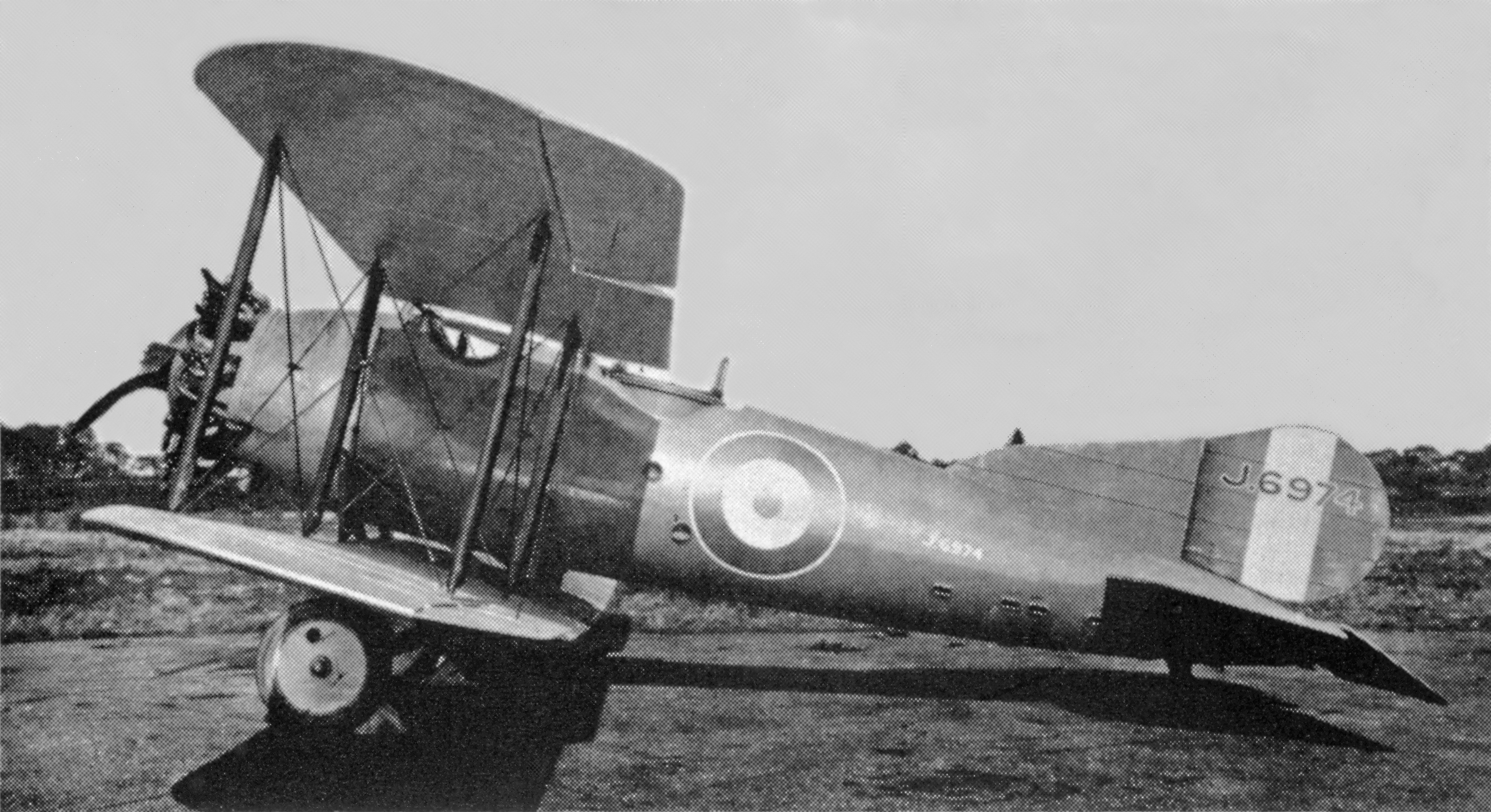
- Springbok I prototype (J6974), Martlesham Heath 1923

General information
- Type: Two-seater biplane
- Manufacturer: Short Brothers
- Designer: Oswald Short
- Primary user: Aeroplane and Armament Experimental Establishment (A&AEE), Martlesham Heath
- Number built: 2 (S.3 Springbok I); 3 (S.3b Springbok II); 1 (S.3b Chamois)

History
- First flight: S.3 (Springbok I): 19 April 1923; S.3a (Springbok II): 25 March 1925; S.3b (Chamois): 14 March 1927

The Short Springbok was a two-seat, all-metal reconnaissance biplane produced for the British Air Ministry in the 1920s. Altogether, six aircraft of the Springbok design were built but none entered service with the armed forces.

== Design ==
The Springbok fuselage was of streamlined monocoque construction, mounted onto the lower wing and almost filling the gap between the upper and lower wings. The wings were single-bay, of unequal span and unequal chord, constructed of steel spars with an aluminum (S.3/3a Springbok) / fabric covering (S.3b Chamois). The ailerons were on the upper wing only. The crew of two sat in tandem open cockpits, with a cutout in the upper mainplane for the pilot's head; the observer/gunner sat behind the pilot, just behind the upper wing. The tail unit comprised a braced monoplane tail near the fuselage top with a single fin and rudder. The undercarriage was of the cross-axle type, situated under the nose and complemented by a tailskid at the rear.

== History ==
=== Springbok ===
The Springbok traces its history from the pioneering, all-metal Short Silver Streak, which was exhibited at the Olympia Aero Show in 1920. The Air Ministry had purchased the Silver Streak and subjected it to structural tests for two years at R.A.E., Farnborough. When in due course the Air Ministry issued a "Bristol Fighter-replacement" Specification 19/21, Short Brothers contracted to deliver two S.3 Springbok I two-seat reconnaissance biplanes (J6974 and J6975). On 30 November 1923, the second of the two prototypes, J6975, crashed near Martlesham when it spun in shortly after takeoff, killing the pilot. The cause was diagnosed as rudder blanking during spinning and a new wing design was prepared for the Springbok Mk. II, of which six examples – later reduced to three – were ordered in 1924.

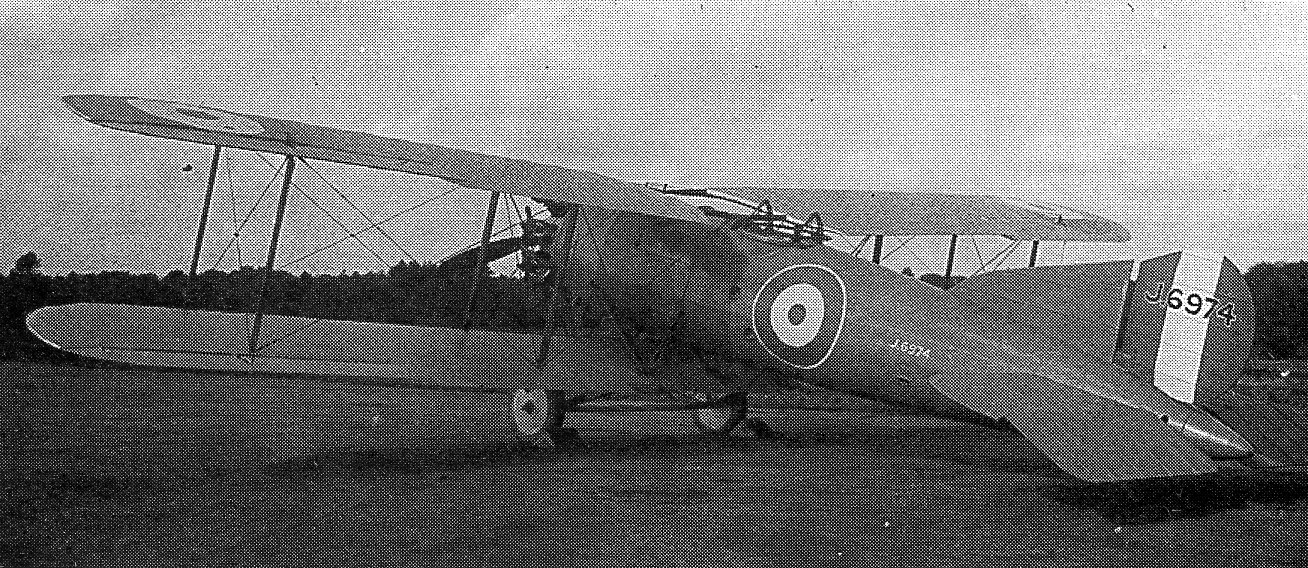
Springbok at Martlesham with fabric-covered wings

Powered by a 400 hp Bristol Jupiter IV radial engine, the S.3 Springbok I was an all-metal aircraft, with a duralumin monocoque fuselage and two-bay, equal-span wings. The strength/weight factor of the mainplanes was disappointing and the Air Ministry ordered three more Springboks with lighter, fabric-covered wings attached directly to the lower fuselage and a redesigned tail assembly. The first of these S.3a Springbok IIs (numbered J7295-J7297) was flown by Shorts' Chief Test Pilot J. Lankester Parker at the Isle of Grain on 25 March 1925.

=== Chamois ===
The S.3b Chamois was produced in response to Specification 30/24 (as was the Vickers Vespa), which while still intended to replace the Bristol Fighter, was intended for the army cooperation role. It was decided to modify the first Springbok II (J7295) to meet the new specification. The fuselage and Jupiter IV engine ware retained, but new single-bay wings were provided. These fabric-covered wings had steel box spars rather than the tubular spars used by the Springbok, while the upper wings used a thicker airfoil section (RAF 32) which allowed the fuel tanks to be housed completely Within the wings. A single fixed forward-firing Vickers machine gun was operated by the pilot, while a flexibly mounted Lewis gun was provided for the observer. Four 20 lb (9.1 kg) or two 112 lb (51 kg) bombs could be carried on underwing racks.

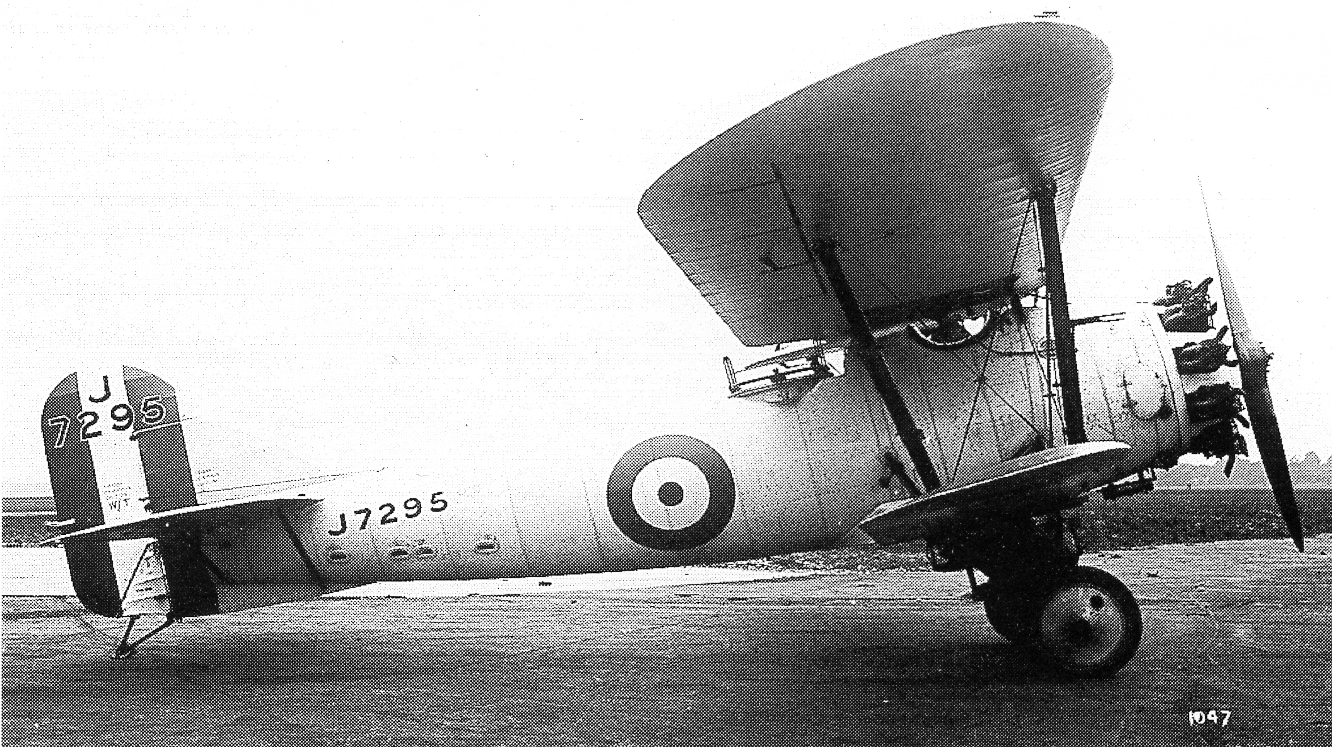
Short Chamois

The Chamois' first flight took place at Lympne Aerodrome on 14 March 1927, also flown by Lankester Parker. It was delivered to the Aeroplane and Armament Experimental Establishment (A&AEE) at Martlesham Heath, on 27 April 1927 for testing by 22 Squadron, the RAF unit responsible for test flying for the A&AEE, although the competition for Specification 30/24 had already been decided and the Armstrong Whitworth Atlas ordered into production. While it was noted that the aircraft was easy to maintain, testing revealed several major problems, with a very poor view from the cockpit and poor directional control, particularly at low speeds. The aircraft was also reported to be very noisy, with the monocoque fuselage being described as acting like a "kettle drum". The testing concluded that the Chamois was unsuitable for use as an Army Cooperation Aircraft or for other service use, and the Chamois was scrapped following completion of testing at Martlesham.

== Operators ==
United Kingdom

- Aeroplane and Armament Experimental Establishment (A&AEE)

== Specifications (Springbok I) ==
Data from Shorts Aircraft since 1900

General characteristics

- Crew: 2
- Length: 26 ft 11 in (8.20 m)
- Wingspan: 42 ft 0 in (12.80 m)
- Wing area: 463 sq ft (43.0 m^{2})
- Gross weight: 4,080 lb (1,851 kg)
- Powerplant: 1 × Bristol Jupiter IV air-cooled 9-cylinder radial engine, 425 hp (317 kW)

Performance

- Maximum speed: 121 mph (195 km/h, 105 kn)

Armament

- Guns:
  - 1× fixed, forward-firing .303 in (7.7mm) Vickers machine gun
  - 2× .303 in (7.7mm) Lewis guns on scarff ring in rear cockpit

== See also ==
Related development

- Short Silver Streak

Related lists

- List of aircraft of the Royal Air Force
