= Denhaut Hy.479 =

Hy.479
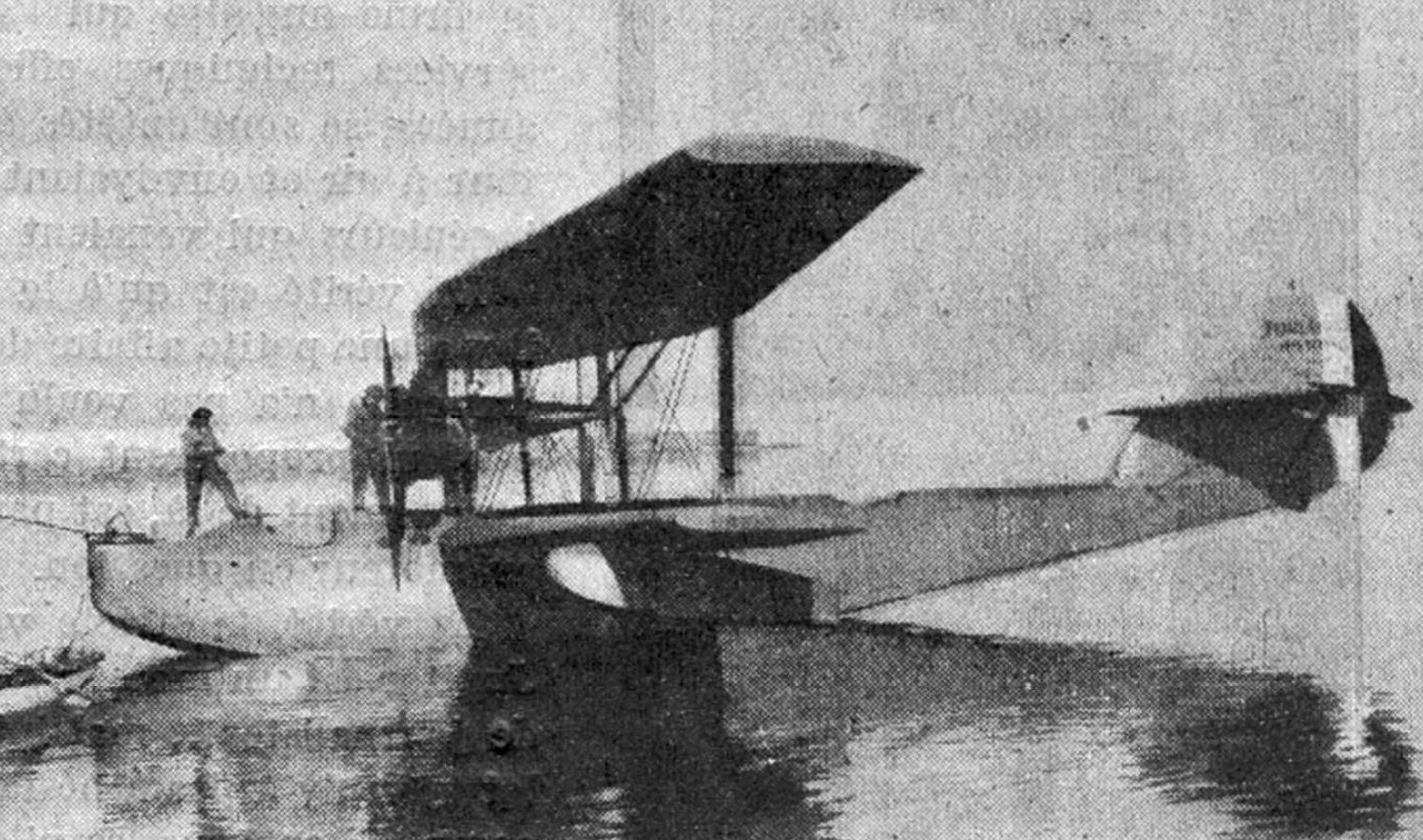

General information
- Type: Military or commercial amphibian flying boat
- National origin: France
- Manufacturer: France-Aviation
- Designer: François Denhaut
- Number built: 1

History
- First flight: late 1926

The Denhaut Hy.479 was a French flying boat flown in 1926 and intended to be suitable for commercial or military applications. Only one, in military configuration, was built and was sometimes known as the France-Aviation Denhaut.

== Design and development ==
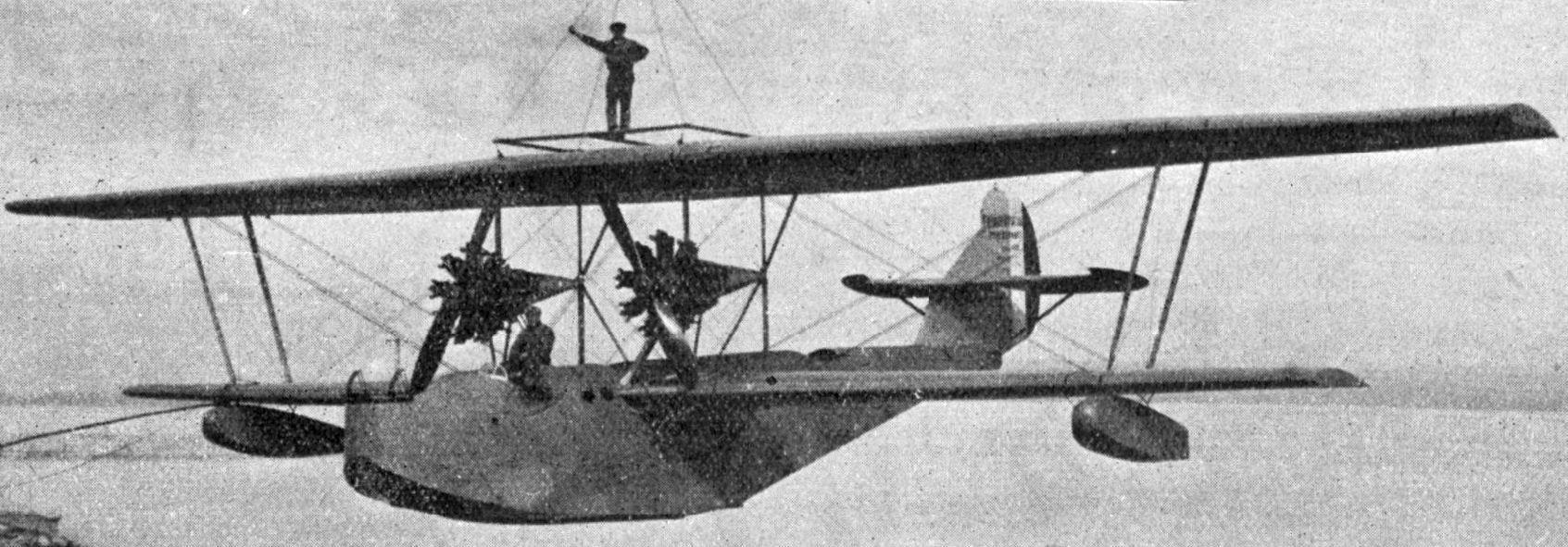
Denhaut Hy.479 photo from L'Aérophile December,1926

The Hy.479 was an unequal span, single bay biplane with thick section wings. The longer upper wing was in three parts, with a short, almost rectangular centre section and trapezoidal outer panels. The lower wings were attached to the upper hull and were swept with constant chord, then straight-tapered to the squared tips. The top surface of the upper wing was flat but deceasing thickness provided some dihedral; the lower wing carried dihedral on both surfaces. Ailerons, which covered over half the span. were only fitted on the upper wing.

Structurally the wings were wooden, with two spars and plywood-covered leading edges; elsewhere the covering was fabric. The wings were braced together on each side by a pair of parallel, outward-leaning interplane struts. Below these, steeply angled stabilizing floats were attached close to the lower wing underside with short struts. To minimise hangar space, the outer wings could be folded back alongside the hull.

The Hy.479 was powered by a pair of 280 kW (380 hp) Gnome & Rhône 9A Jupiter nine-cylinder radial engines strut-mounted midway between the wings immediately below the end of the upper centre-section, placing them as close together as the propellers allowed. The engines were uncowled, though their accessories were placed behind them under conical fairings.

Its hull was deep, with steep sides and a shallow V-section bottom without steps. It was compartmented, double- and triple-planked below the waterline and plywood covered above. The pilots sat side by side in an open cockpit ahead of the propellers, protected by a generous windscreen. In the military configured first and only prototype there were machine gunners positions in the rounded nose and midway between the wings and tail. The Denhaut had a large, triangular fin, with a deep, curved, balanced rudder. Its delta plan tailplane was mounted halfway up the fin, braced on each side with a single strut to the lower hull, and carried balanced elevators with a cut-out for rudder movement.

The Hy.479 could be easily configured as an amphibian, with mainwheels on V-struts hinged on extensions of the engine struts and inner V-struts braced to the lower hull. With the inner struts disconnected, the wheels could be raised outwards to the wing underside.

The date of the Hy.479's first flight is not known but trials were under way in early December 1926, flown from Étang de Berre. Flight characteristics, including single-engined performance, were reported to be good; allowing the aircraft to go to Saint Raphaël for official tests in January 1927. After a minor accident when a crane cable failed, development was stopped as Denhaut withdrew from the project, possibly due to Aeronavale's preference for tandem engines (reducing problems of asymmetric thrust during engine failure / differential throttle settings).

The proposed passenger version with an internal cabin was not built.

== Specifications (Hy.479) ==
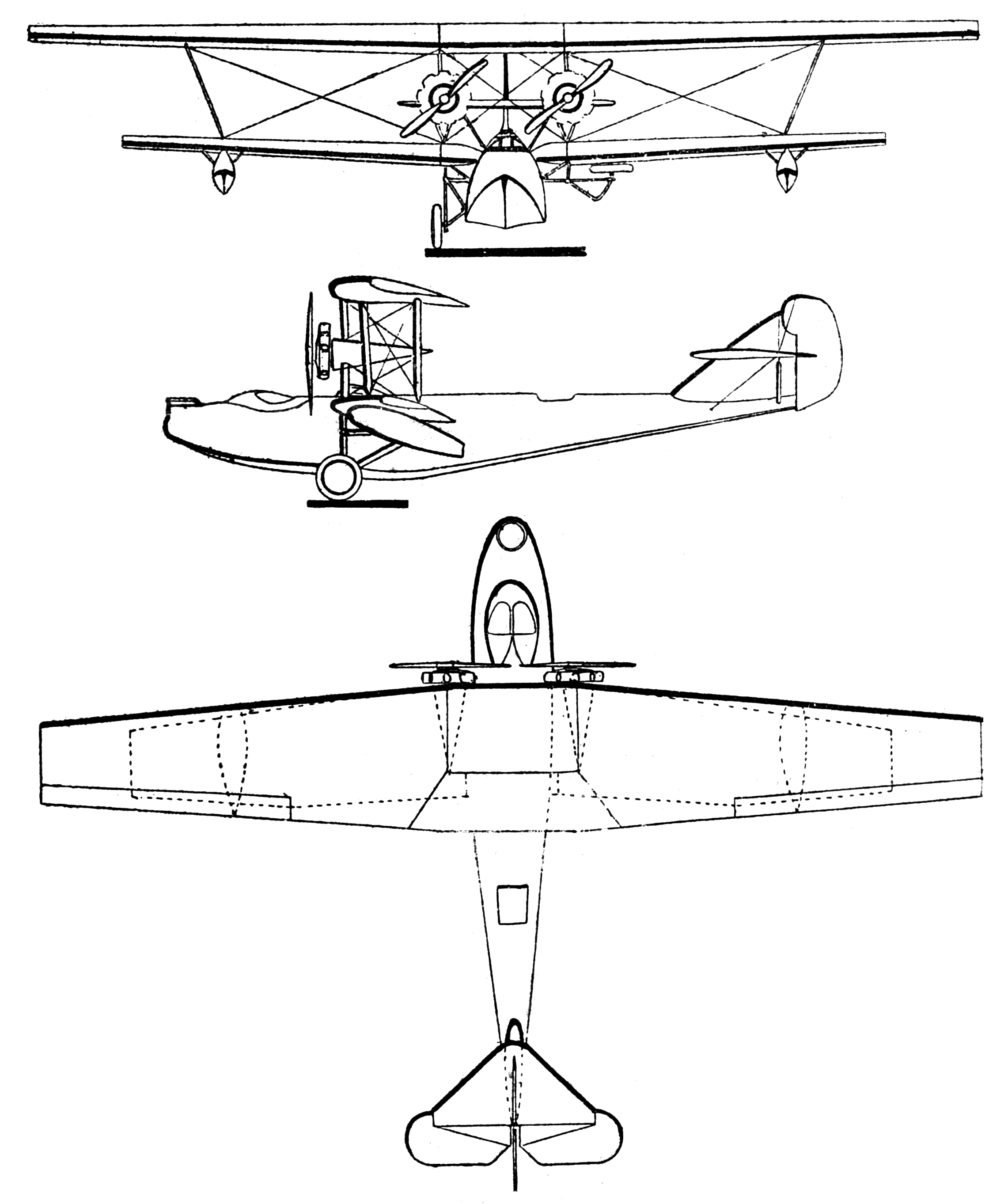
France-Aviation Denhaut 3-view drawing from Les Ailes December 9, 1926

Data from Les Ailes, December 1926

General characteristics

- Length: 17.20 m (56 ft 5 in)
- Upper wingspan: 24 m (78 ft 9 in)
- Lower wingspan: 19.30 m (63 ft 4 in)
- Height: 5.10 m (16 ft 9 in)
- Wing area: 116 m^{2} (1,250 sq ft)
- Empty weight: 3,220 kg (7,099 lb)
- Gross weight: 5,220 kg (11,508 lb) with wheels
- Powerplant: 2 × Gnome & Rhône 9A Jupiter 9-cylinder radial, 280 kW (380 hp) each
- Propellers: 2-bladed

Performance

- Maximum speed: 170 km/h (110 mph, 92 kn) at ground level
- Cruise speed: 150 km/h (93 mph, 81 kn)
- Stall speed: 85 km/h (53 mph, 46 kn) minimum speed
- Range: 1,200 km (750 mi, 650 nmi)
- Time to altitude: 6 min to 1,000 m (3,300 ft)
- Take-off time: 30 s
