= Vickers Vellore =

Large biplane designed as a freight and mail carrier

Vellore / Vellox
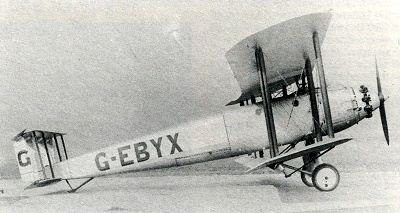
- Vickers Vellore

General information
- Type: mail and freight carrier
- National origin: United Kingdom
- Manufacturer: Vickers
- Number built: 3 Vellore and 1 Vellox

History
- First flight: 17 May 1928

The Vickers Vellore was a large biplane designed as a freight and mail carrier, in single-engined and twin-engined versions, which saw limited use as freighters and long-range experimental aircraft. A final variant with a broader fuselage, the Vellox, was completed as an airliner.

== Development ==
The Vickers Vellore, named after the Indian city of Vellore, was a response to Air Ministry specification 34/24, which called for a civil mail and freight carrier. It was a very large single-engined two-bay biplane, metal framed and fabric covered. The wings were of equal span with a slight stagger and sweep and braced with parallel interplane struts. Both upper and lower wings carried balanced ailerons. There were gaps both above and below the fuselage, whose diameter increased behind the radial engine. The crew sat side by side in an open cockpit just in front of the wings, giving an excellent view. Behind them was the cargo hold, with the fuselage tapering towards the biplane tailplane which was fitted with balanced elevators. There were four slender finless rudders, roughly equally spaced between the two tailplanes. The undercarriage was a simple fixed split-axle arrangement, plus a sprung tailskid.

The Vellore I, fitted with a 515 hp (384 kW) Bristol Jupiter IX, flew for the first time on 17 May 1928. It appeared at the RAF Hendon display in June that year, then went on to RAF Martlesham Heath for tests in October. These it passed with flying colours, its performance better than predicted and it demonstrated good reliability. In early 1929 the Vellore was fitted with an Armstrong Siddeley Jaguar VI and extra fuel tanks in the freight compartment for a flight to Australia. Leaving Lympne on 18 March 1929 with a full 5,000 lb (2,300 kg) load including the extra fuel, the Vellore II (or Jaguar-Vellore) made Benghazi in stages before engine trouble caused a forced landing. After spares arrived, the flight continued until the engine malfunctioned again over the Timor Sea, and the Vellore was wrecked in trees near the Cape Don lighthouse at the western extremity of the Cobourg Peninsula on the Australian mainland. The two Australian crew were unhurt.

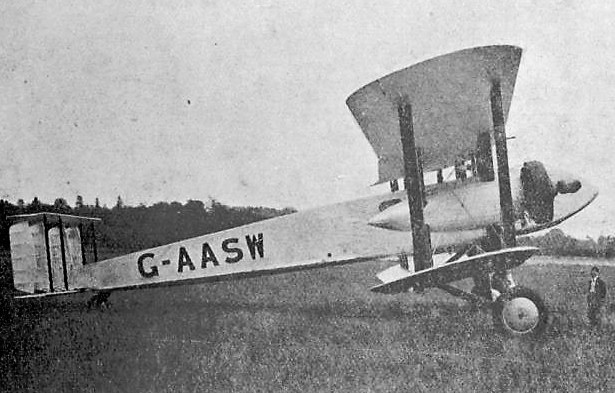
The twin-engine Vickers Vellore III, from Annuaire de L'Aéronautique 1931

The Vellore III was a twin-engined development that was fitted with a pair of 525 hp (391 kW) Jupiter XIFs with Townend rings and mounted in nacelles cowlings midway between the wings.

The lower wing was slightly decreased in span so the outboard interplane struts leaned outwards. The other alteration was to the main undercarriage, which was now mounted under the engines, providing a wide track . The Vellore III could also be operated as a seaplane with single-step floats replacing the wheels. A second twin-engined Vellore was built, differing only in having slightly higher compression Jupiter IX engines and eventually known as the Vellore IV. This aircraft was in use until early 1935, transporting troops and stores between Martlesham and nearby Orfordness.

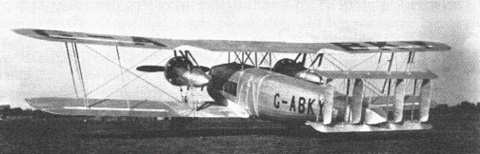
Vellox on the ground

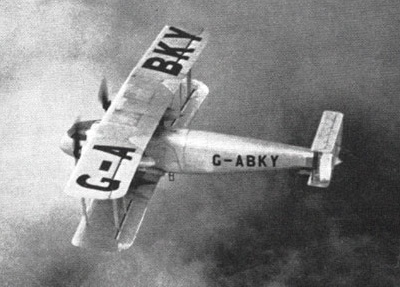
Vellox in flight

The last aircraft of the series was based on a partially completed third twin-engined Vellore airframe, fitted with a new, broader fuselage with an enclosed cockpit, and cabin windows for the passenger compartment, and was powered by 600 hp (450 kW) Bristol Pegasus IM3 radials. This variant was renamed the Vickers Vellox, flying for the first time on 23 January 1934 in the hands of Mutt Summers.

== Operational history ==
Vickers had hoped to sell the Vellox as a ten-passenger airliner and the new fuselage had five windows per side in front of large starboard side freight doors at the wing trailing edge, but the sole example was used by Imperial Airways as a freighter, mailplane, and for testing Lorenz beam. The Vellox crashed shortly after takeoff from Croydon Airport in August 1936 due to a loss of power possibly as a result of a fuel problem. The crew of two pilots and two wireless operators was killed.

== Variants ==
Vellore I (Type 134)
Jupiter-powered single-engine freighter, one built.
Vellore II/Jaguar-Vellore (Type 166)
Jaguar IV-powered single-engine freighter for Australia flight, one converted from Vellore I.
Vellore III (Type 172)
Jupiter XIF-powered twin-engine freighter, one built.
Vellore IV (Type 173)
Jupiter XIF-powered twin-engine mailplane, one built.
Vellox (Type 212)
Pegasus-powered twin-engined airliner, one built.

== Specifications (Vellore III) ==
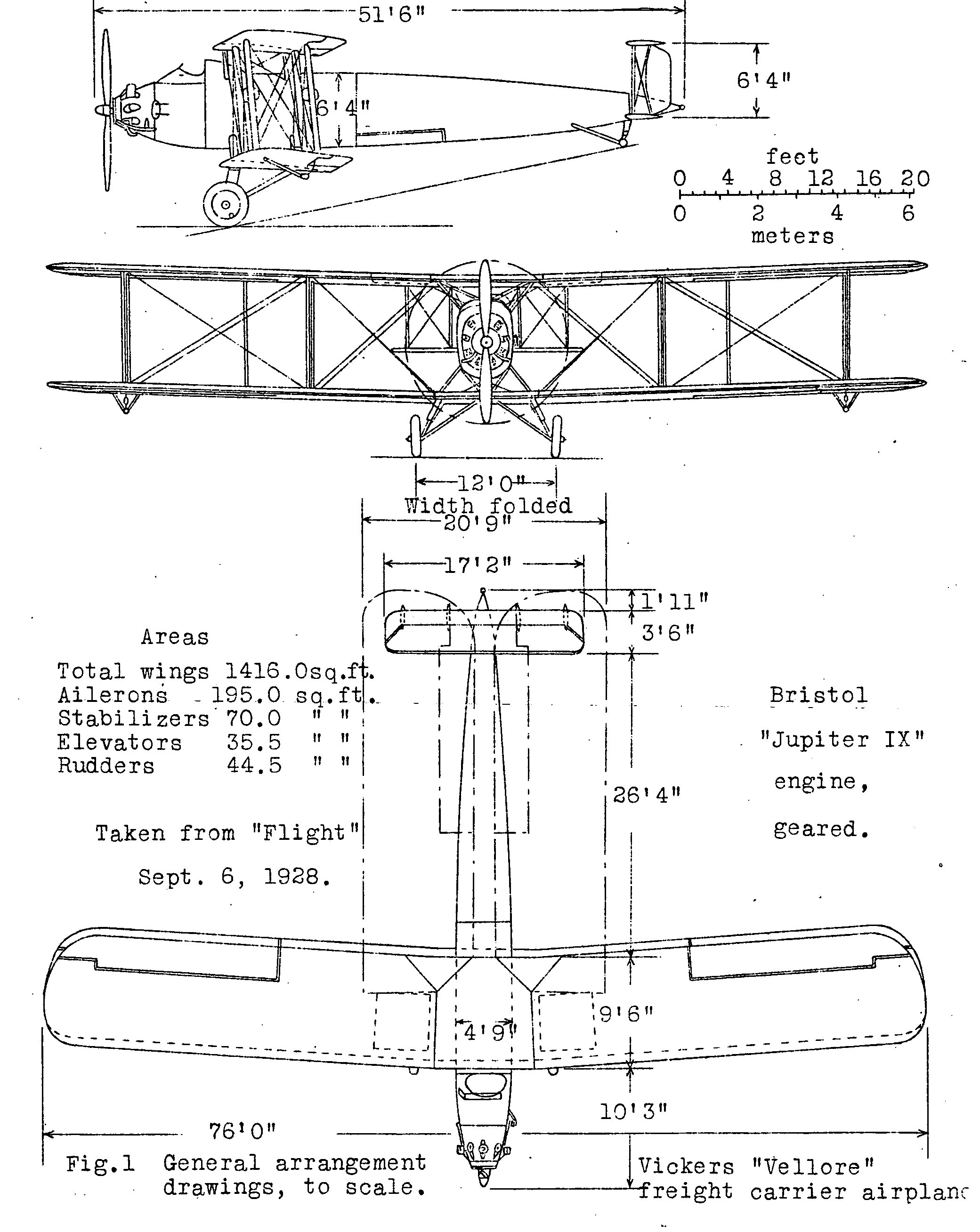
Vickers Vellore 3-view drawing from NACA Aircraft Circular No.83

Data from

General characteristics

- Crew: 2
- Capacity: 1,000 lb (450 kg) mail
- Length: 48 ft 0 in (14.63 m)
- Wingspan: 76 ft 0 in (23.16 m)
- Height: 16 ft 3 in (4.95 m)
- Wing area: 1,373 sq ft (127.6 m^{2})
- Empty weight: 7,925 lb (3,595 kg)
- Gross weight: 13,000 lb (5,897 kg)
- Powerplant: 2 × Bristol Jupiter XIF nine-cylinder radial engines, 525 hp (391 kW) each

Performance

- Maximum speed: 127 mph (204 km/h, 110 kn) at sea level
- Range: 300 mi (480 km, 260 nmi)
- Rate of climb: 850 ft/min (4.3 m/s)
- Time to altitude: 7 min to 5,000 ft (1,500 m)
