= De Havilland DH.72 =

British three-engined biplane bomber

DH.72
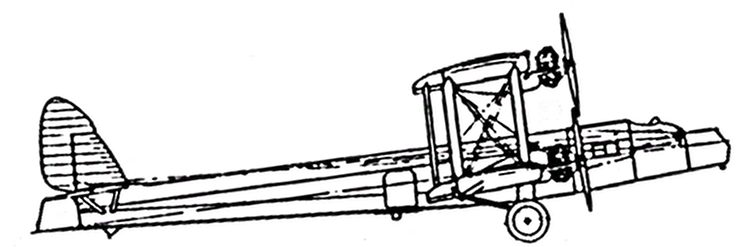

General information
- Type: Heavy night bomber
- National origin: United Kingdom
- Manufacturer: de Havilland Aircraft Co, Ltd.
- Number built: 1

History
- First flight: 27 July 1931

The de Havilland DH.72 was a large British three-engined biplane bomber, designed as a Vickers Virginia replacement. It did not go into production.

== Development ==
Air Ministry specification B.22/27 was for a Vickers Virginia night bomber replacement and de Havilland obtained an order for a single prototype. The DH.72 was begun as a scaled-up and militarized version of their successful Hercules three-engined biplane airliner. It took a long time to build – about three years – partly because the contract called for duralumin clad wings and de Havilland were not familiar with metal construction methods, and partly because the Air Ministry required a nose gunner's position, which required the central engine of the Hercules to be moved to the upper wing. The aircraft was completed by Gloster's at Brockworth, with whom de Havilland had a military aircraft manufacturing agreement, fitted with three 595 hp (444 kW) Bristol Jupiter XFS radial engines.

Like the Hercules, the DH.72 had unswept, unstaggered parallel chord wings of equal span. The new aircraft's span, though, was 19.5% bigger and the wings were of three rather than two-bay construction. There were ailerons on both wings and slots on the upper ones. To provide clearance for the propeller of the central engine, the upper wing was high above the fuselage; the lower wing was attached about one third the way up the fuselage side. The outer engines were mounted on the upper side of the lower wing, just inboard of the first interplane struts. Below them were pairs of well-spaced wheels forming a widetrack undercarriage. These were braced to the fuselage, leaving a clear underside for the fitting of bomb racks. Unlike the Hercules, the DH.72 had a monoplane tail unit but retained the twin fins. Rudder and elevators were balanced, the horns of the latter projecting well beyond the fixed surfaces. The elevators were split and the rear gunner sat between them in the extreme tail. The fuselage was flat-sided, with a door just aft of the wings and an internal cabin with a pair of windows just forward of the propellers. The pilots' open cockpit was well forward, with the front gunner below them in the nose.

The DH.72 first flew on 27 July 1931, and visited RAE Farnborough in mid-November before going on to competitive trials at RAF Martlesham Heath. There, one of its competitors was the Boulton Paul P.32. Neither aircraft received a production order and only one DH.72 was built.

== Specifications ==
Data from Jackson 1978, pp. 282–3

General characteristics

- Crew: 5
- Wingspan: 95 ft 0 in (28.96 m)
- Wing area: 1,930 sq ft (179.3 m^{2})
- Gross weight: 21,462 lb (9,735 kg)
- Powerplant: 3 × Bristol Jupiter XFS supercharged 9-cylinder radial , 595 hp (444 kW) each

Armament

- Provision for 2× .303 in Lewis guns in nose and tail gunners positions
- 2,500 lb (1,140 kg) bombs on external racks
