= Short Silver Streak =

Silver Streak
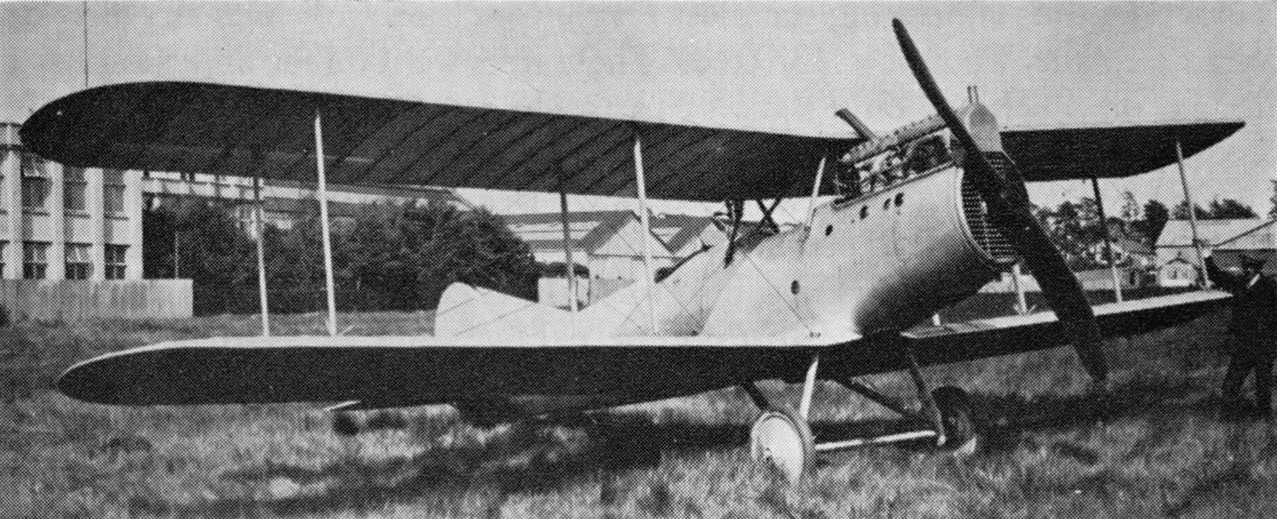

General information
- Type: Experimental all-metal biplane
- National origin: United Kingdom
- Manufacturer: Short Brothers
- Number built: 1

History
- First flight: August 20, 1920

The Short Silver Streak was the first British all-metal aircraft. It was designed and built by Short Brothers at Rochester, Kent, England. Although Flight magazine claimed that it was the first instance of stressed skin construction in the world, it was preceded by a number of Dornier designs, including the Dornier-Zeppelin D.I, which was ordered into production.

== Development ==
The Silver Streak was a single-seat biplane with a semi-monocoque duralumin fuselage and duralumin-covered wings. The wing skin was not stressed. The Silver Streak had a conventional landing gear and was powered by a 240 hp (180 kW) Siddeley Puma engine. The Silver Streak was exhibited in July 1920 at the Olympia in London. Registered G-EARQ, it was first flown at Grain on 20 August 1920 by test pilot J. L. Parker. It was later modified as a two-seater and delivered to the Air Ministry in February 1921 for both flight and static testing. The Air Ministry issued a specification for a two-seat reconnaissance biplane and Shorts produced the Springbok based on the Silver Streak.

== Specifications ==
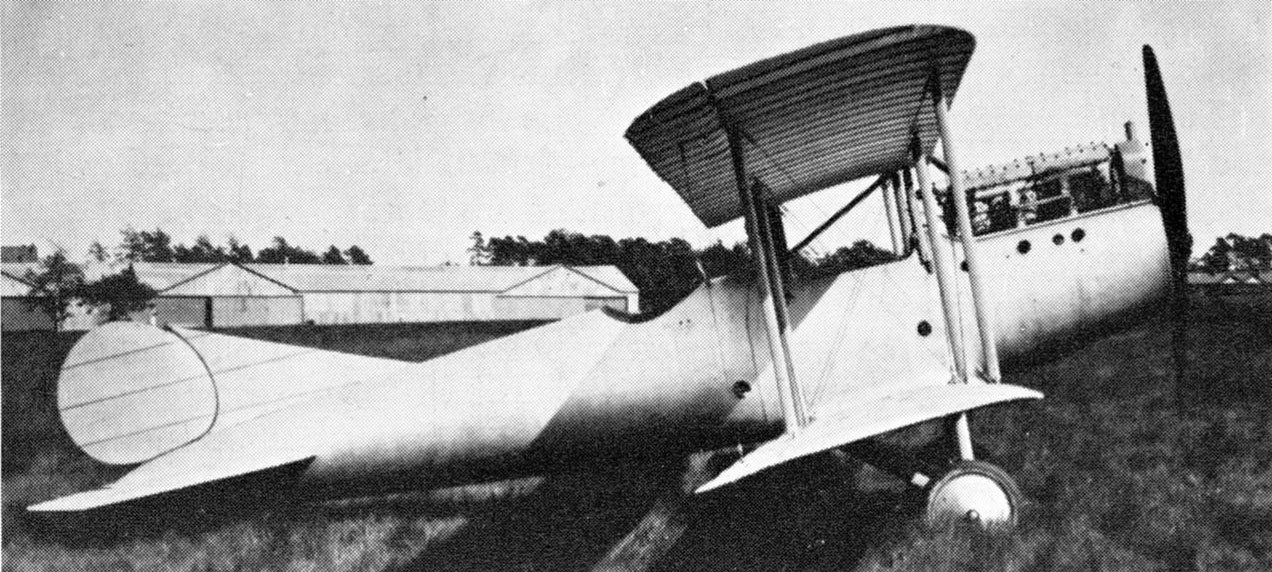
The Silver Streak at Farnborough in February 1921

Data from Jackson.

General characteristics

- Crew: one (later two)
- Length: 26 ft 6 in (8.08 m)
- Wingspan: 37 ft 6 in (11.43 m)
- Wing area: 370 sq ft (34 m^{2})
- Empty weight: 1,865 lb (846 kg)
- Gross weight: 2,870 lb (1,302 kg)
- Powerplant: 1 × Siddeley Puma 6-cylinder water-cooled inline piston engine, 230 hp (170 kW)

Performance

- Maximum speed: 120 mph (190 km/h, 100 kn)
- Cruise speed: 90 mph (140 km/h, 78 kn)
- Range: 450 mi (720 km, 390 nmi)

== See also ==
Related development

- Short Springbok
- Short S.1 Cockle
- Short S.2
