= Hawker Hawfinch =

British single-engined biplane fighter

Hawfinch
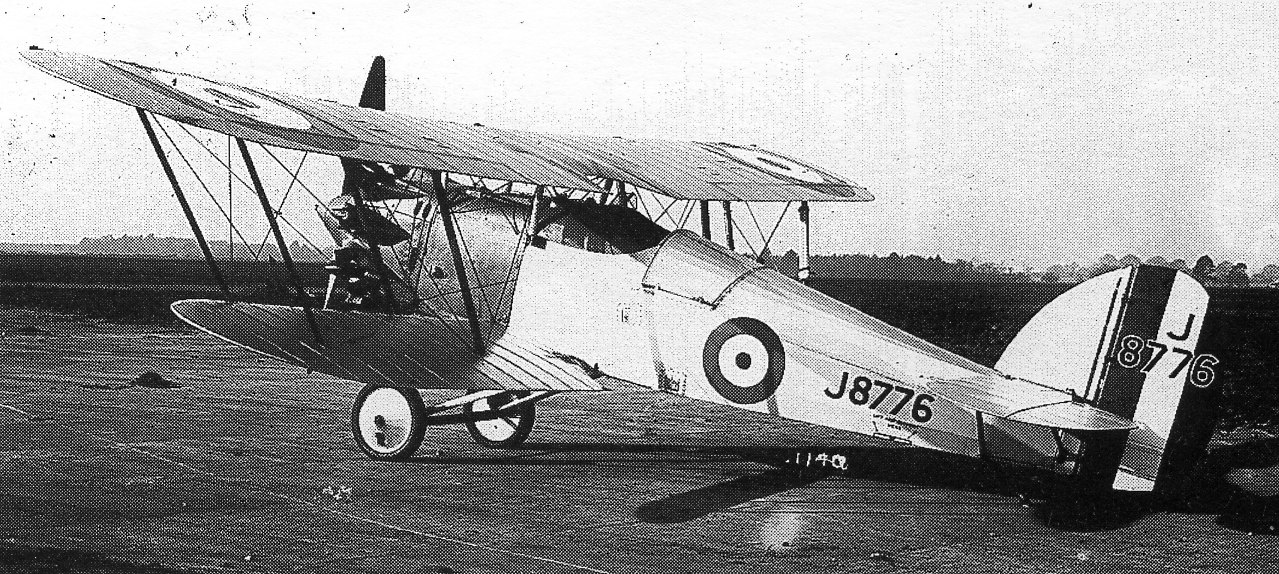

General information
- Type: Fighter
- Manufacturer: Hawker Aircraft
- Designer: Sydney Camm
- Status: Prototype only
- Number built: One

History
- First flight: March 1927

The Hawker Hawfinch was a British single-engined biplane fighter of the 1920s. It was unsuccessful, with the Bristol Bulldog being selected instead.

== Development ==
The Hawker Hawfinch fighter aircraft was designed in 1925 as a replacement for both the Armstrong-Whitworth Siskin and the Gloster Gamecock fighters. It participated in the competition to meet Specification F9/26, together with other aircraft manufacturers, that included nine different designs, of which five were built. The Hawfinch first flew in March 1927. The Bristol Bulldog and the Hawfinch were considered to be the best of the aircraft evaluated, and were selected for more detailed evaluation. The contract was finally awarded to the Bristol Bulldog, because of its slightly higher maximum speed as well as being easier to maintain. After the completion of the competition, the prototype Hawfinch was used for experimental purposes, being tested with single-bay wings and with a twin-float undercarriage.

Only one prototype was built.

== Description ==
The Hawfinch was a two-bay biplane with staggered wings. The structure was the patented Hawker metal tube & "fishplate" system, with fabric covering. It was the first all-metal fighter to be built by Hawker. The powerplant was initially a Bristol Jupiter VI engine, but this was changed to a Jupiter VII (450 hp/336 kW) before the performance trials. The armament consisted of two Vickers machine guns synchronised to fire through the propeller.

== Specifications (Hawfinch (Jupiter VII)) ==
Data from

General characteristics

- Crew: 1
- Length: 23 ft 8 in (7.21 m)
- Wingspan: 33 ft 6 in (10.21 m)
- Height: 9 ft 4 in (2.84 m)
- Wing area: 294 sq ft (27.3 m^{2})
- Empty weight: 1,925 lb (873 kg)
- Gross weight: 2,910 lb (1,320 kg)
- Powerplant: 1 × Bristol Jupiter VII 9-cylinder radial engine, 450 hp (340 kW)

Performance

- Maximum speed: 171 mph (275 km/h, 149 kn) at 9,800 ft (3,000 m)
- Service ceiling: 24,000 ft (7,300 m)
- Time to altitude: 7 min 40 s to 10,000 ft (3,000 m)

Armament

- Guns: 2 × 0.303 in (7.7 mm) Vickers machine guns
- Bombs: Provision for 4 × 20 lb (9 kg) bombs
