= Bristol Badger =

British fighter plane of First World War

Badger
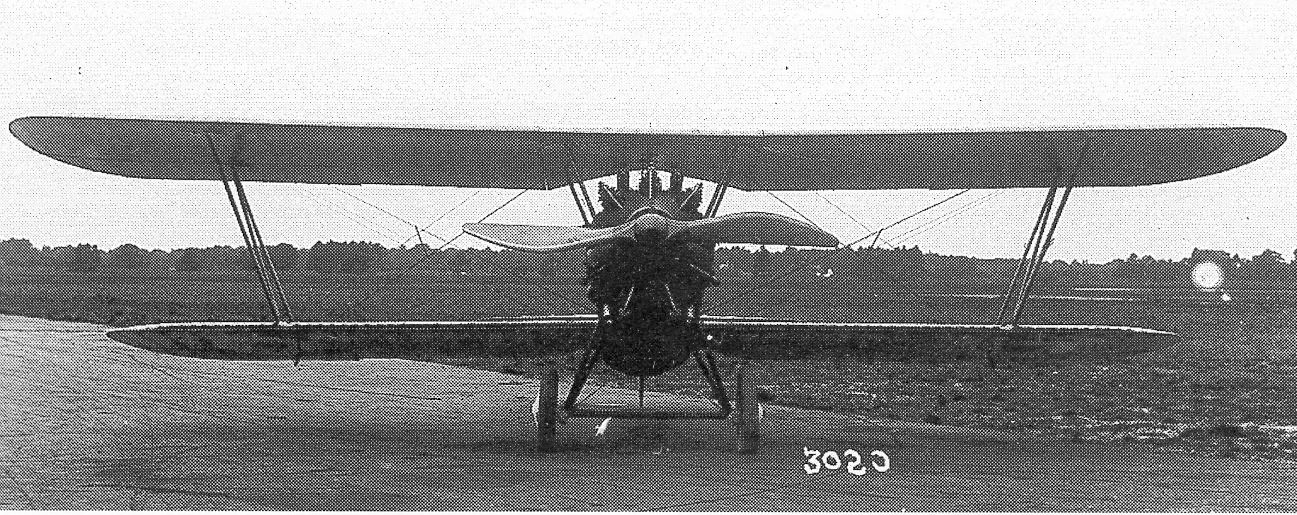

General information
- Type: Fighter-reconnaissance
- National origin: United Kingdom
- Manufacturer: The British & Colonial Aeroplane Co. Ltd
- Designer: Frank Barnwell
- Number built: 5

History
- First flight: 4 February 1919

The Bristol Badger was designed to meet a British need for a two-seat fighter-reconnaissance aeroplane at the end of the First World War. Three Badgers were delivered to the Air Board to develop air-cooled radial engines, particularly that which became the Bristol Jupiter; two other Badgers were also built.

== Development ==
The Bristol Badger had its roots in the Type 22 F.2C, a proposed upgrade of the Bristol F.2B using a 200 hp (150 kW) Salmson radial (Type 22), a 300 hp (220 kW) ABC Dragonfly radial (Type 22A), or a 230 hp (170 kW) Bentley B.R.2 rotary (Type 22B). The Type 23 Badger was a new design using the Dragonfly engine, drawn up at the end of 1917 to meet a two-seat fighter-reconnaissance role and owing a good deal to the Bristol Scout F. It was a single-bay biplane with strongly staggered, unswept and unequal-span wings. The pilot and observer sat in tandem, the pilot in front under the upper-wing trailing edge and the observer behind with a ring-mounted 0.303 in (7.7 mm) Lewis Gun. At first, the Badger had almost no fixed fin. Construction was the usual for the era fabric covered wood-and-fabric. The undercarriage was a single axle plus tailskid arrangement.

During the design process, it became clear that the Dragonfly engine was proving unreliable and Bristol looked to a new nine-cylinder, 400 hp (300 kW) radial produced by Brazil Straker and known then as the Cosmos Jupiter as a possible alternative. Later, this engine became the Bristol Jupiter.

Bristol was awarded a contract to build three Badgers, two powered by the Dragonfly and one (the second) by a Jupiter. The first Badger flew on 4 February 1919 but crashed on this first flight with fuel supply problems. It was rebuilt with a larger rudder and delivered to the Air Board eleven days later. The second, Jupiter-engined Badger, flew on 24 May but was re-engined with a Dragonfly and was purchased by the Air Board in September. It had full armament and a fixed, rounded fin, introduced to cope with the heavier Jupiter engine. The Badger proved to have a lateral stability problem, an adverse yaw effect caused by aileron drag, and because of this the third machine was not accepted by the Air Board. These first three examples were designated Badger I.

Despite the instability, and without having received a Jupiter-powered Badger, the Air Board were sufficiently encouraged by this engine's promise to order a fourth, fully armed Badger with this powerplant. After some testing the rudder was modified with a horn balance and larger ailerons were fitted. This aircraft was the sole Badger II and was loaned by the Air Board to Bristol for the development of the Jupiter and its cowling during 1920–1.

The lateral stability problems of the Badger worried its designer Frank Barnwell, because a 1/10 scale model had been carefully tested in the NPL wind tunnel without showing any problems. Scaling from model to full size was a problem because the Reynolds numbers reached in the atmospheric pressure wind tunnels of the time were much lower than those encountered in full-size flight. Flight tunnel tests also often involved the use of simplified aircraft models, with no attempt made to model the fuselage shape in detail. Using a spare set of Badger wings and empennage, Barnwell designed a new single-seat flat-sided and very simple fuselage made from plywood on a wooden frame for a fifth and final Badger, the Badger X. This first flew on 13 May 1919 and was Bristol's first civil registered aircraft, initially as K110, then G-EABU, but was never able to provide the intended comparative data with tunnel models, crashing on 22 May.

== Specifications (Badger II) ==
Data from Barnes 1964, pp. 137

General characteristics

- Crew: two
- Length: 23 ft 8 in (7.21 m)
- Wingspan: 36 ft 9 in (11.20 m)
- Height: 9 ft 1 in (2.77 m)
- Wing area: 357 sq ft (33.2 m^{2})
- Empty weight: 1,950 lb (885 kg)
- Gross weight: 3,153 lb (1,430 kg)
- Powerplant: 1 × Cosmos Jupiter I nine-cylinder air-cooled radial , 400 hp (300 kW)

Performance

- Maximum speed: 142 mph (228 km/h, 123 kn)
- Service ceiling: 20,600 ft (6,280 m)
