= Bristol Bullfinch =

Experimental British military aircraft

Bullfinch
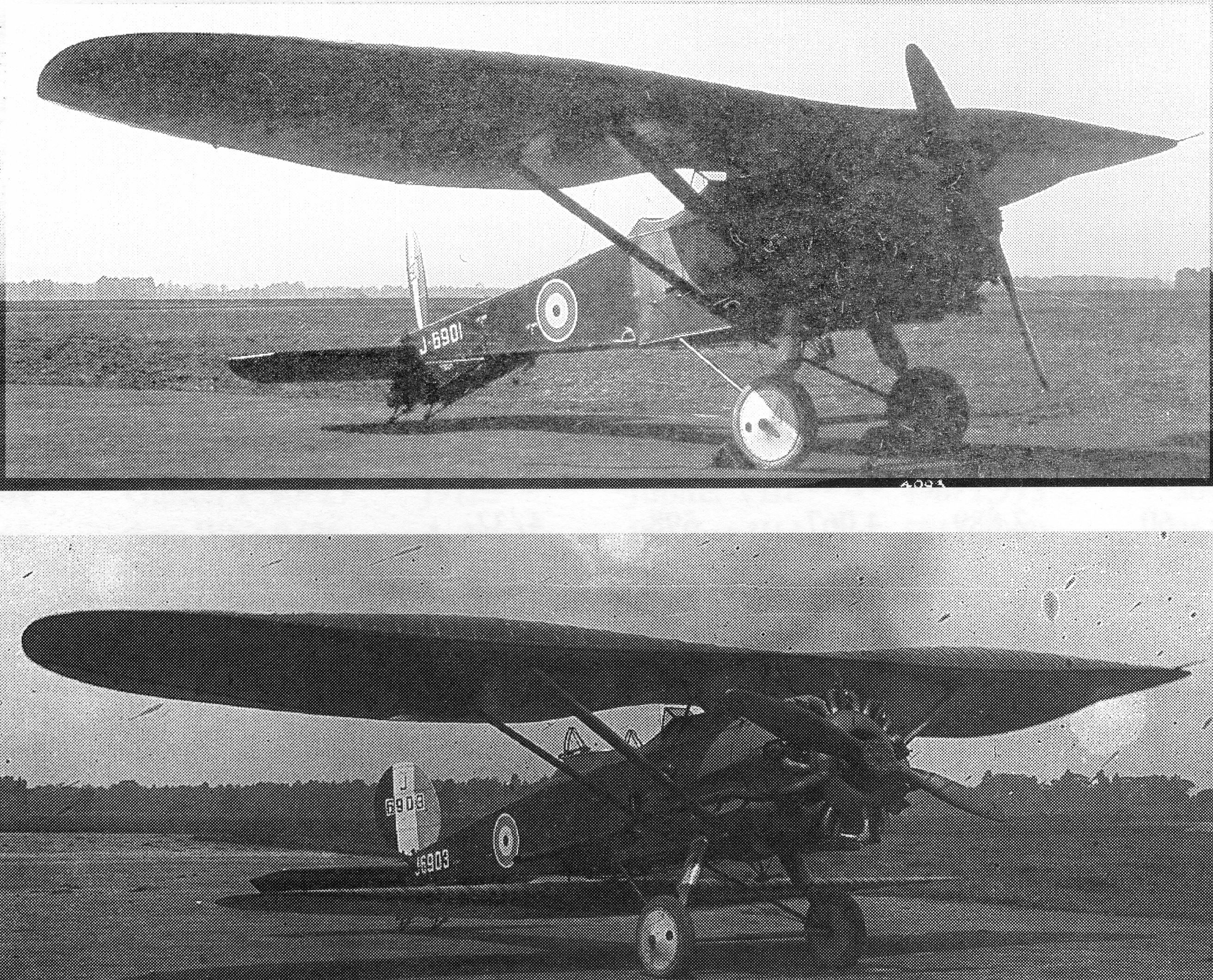
- Bullfinch as single-seat monoplane (top) and as two-seat biplane

General information
- Type: Fighter/Reconnaissance
- Manufacturer: Bristol Aeroplane Company
- Designer: Frank Barnwell
- Number built: 3

History
- First flight: 6 November 1922

The Bristol Bullfinch was an experimental British military aircraft first flown in 1922. Variants were built as both parasol wing monoplanes and biplanes, but both versions proved unsuccessful, and only the three prototypes were built.

== Development ==
The Bullfinch was designed by Frank Barnwell, chief designer of the Bristol Aeroplane Company, as a parasol-wing monoplane single-seat fighter, which was convertible to a two-seat biplane, thus meeting the requirements of the Royal Air Force for both a single-seat interceptor fighter and a two-seat reconnaissance-fighter. The potential cost savings associated with this concept, which was planned to be powered by the Jupiter engine, the rights to which Bristol had just acquired from the bankrupt Cosmos Engineering, interested the Air Ministry, who wrote a specification (Specification 2/21) around Barnwell's proposed design, and ordered three prototypes in June 1921.

The Bullfinch monoplane, or Type 52 Bullfinch Mk I, was a cantilever parasol monoplane with a welded steel tube fuselage. The wing was in two halves, joined at the aircraft centreline, with each half tapering from maximum thickness at half span to both the wing root and tips. The wing was wooden on the prototypes, but was planned to be of metal construction for any subsequent production aircraft. To produce the two-seat fighter-reconnaissance version, the Type 53 Bullfinch Mk II, an extra fuselage bay was added aft of the pilot containing a cockpit for the observer, and a cantilever bottom wing attached which compensated for the shift in centre of gravity resulting from the weight of the observer and the lengthened fuselage.

The first prototype, a Type 52 monoplane, flew on 6 November 1922, with the second prototype, also a monoplane, flying in May 1923. After first flying as a monoplane, the third prototype was converted to the biplane configuration, flying in that configuration on 17 March 1924. While the single-seater demonstrated reasonable performance, the two-seater was overweight, and proved incapable of carrying the required military load. No further production occurred.

== Variants ==
Type 52 Bullfinch Mk I
Single-seat parasol monoplane. Two built.

Type 53 Bullfinch Mk II
Two-seat biplane derivative. One built

== Operators ==
United Kingdom

- Royal Air Force

== Specifications (Bullfinch I) ==
Data from Bristol Aircraft Since 1910

General characteristics

- Crew: one (Bullfinch II): two
- Length: 24 ft 5 in (7.44 m) (Bullfinch II): 27 ft 6 in (8.38 m)
- Wingspan: 38 ft 5 in (11.71 m)
- Height: 10 ft 9 in (3.28 m)
- Wing area: 267 sq ft (24.8 m^{2}) (Bullfinch II): 391 sq ft (36.33 m^{2})
- Empty weight: 2,175 lb (987 kg) (Bullfinch II): 2,495 lb (1,131.7 kg)
- Gross weight: 3,205 lb (1,454 kg) (Bullfinch II): 4,088 lb (1,854.3 kg)
- Powerplant: 1 × Bristol Jupiter III or IV 9-cyl. air-cooled radial piston engine, 425 hp (317 kW)

Performance

- Maximum speed: 135 mph (217 km/h, 117 kn) at 15,000 ft (4,600 m)
  (Bullfinch II): 120 mph (100 kn; 190 km/h) at 15,000 ft (4,600 m)
- Endurance: 4 hours
- Service ceiling: 22,000 ft (6,700 m) (Bullfinch II): 18,000 ft (5,500 m)
- Wing loading: 12 lb/sq ft (59 kg/m^{2}) (Bullfinch II): 10.5 lb/sqft (51.27 kg/m^{2})

Armament

- 2 × fixed, forward-firing .303 in (7.7 mm) Vickers machine guns.
  (Bullfinch II): 1 × .303 in (7.7 mm) Lewis Gun on a Scarff ring in the rear cockpit.
