= Bristol Ten-seater =

British biplanes

Ten-seater/Brandon
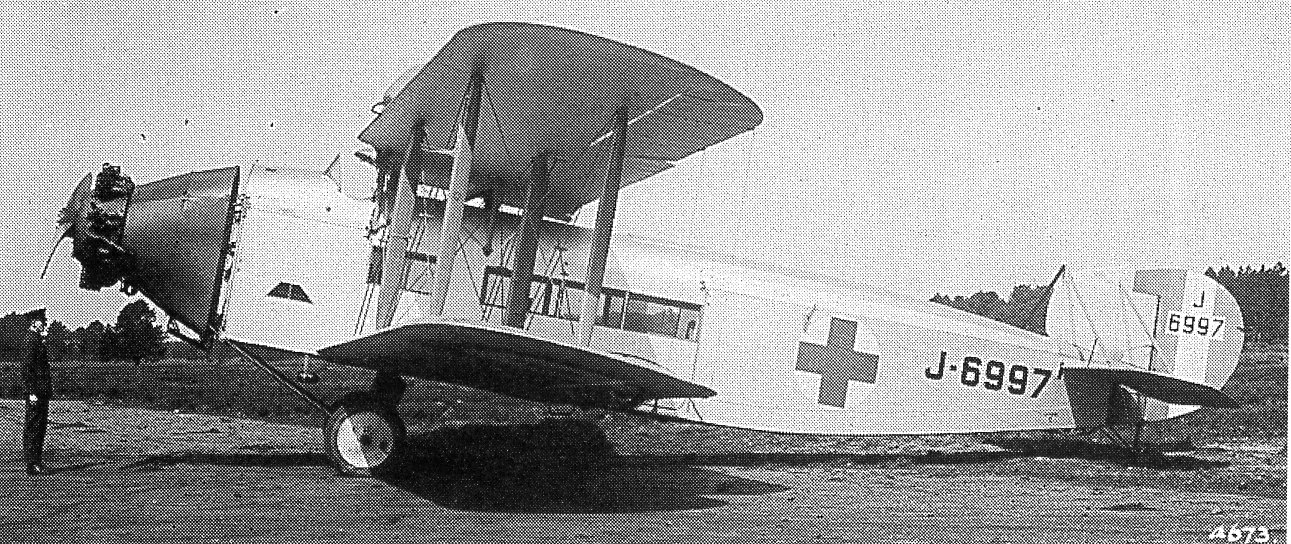

General information
- Type: Transport
- Manufacturer: Bristol Aeroplane Company
- Designer: Frank Barnwell
- Number built: 3

History
- Introduction date: 1922
- First flight: 21 June 1921
- Retired: 1926

The Bristol Ten-seater and Bristol Brandon were British single-engine biplane transport aircraft built by the Bristol Aeroplane Company in the early 1920s. Only three were built, two of which were used as civil transports and one of which (the Bristol Brandon) served with the Royal Air Force.

== Design and development ==
In 1919 and 1920, Frank Barnwell, chief designer of the Bristol Aeroplane Company, considered designs for a commercial transport aircraft, ranging from single-engine, three-seat aircraft to four-engine aircraft carrying ten passengers, none of which were built. Early in 1921, the British government decided to provide subsidies for approved airlines, so Bristol's management authorised Barnwell to proceed with a design for a single-engined transport aircraft. It was intended to be powered by a Bristol Jupiter engine, but this had not yet been type-approved, so the initial prototype was fitted with a Napier Lion engine instead.

The Lion-engined prototype, the Bristol Type 62, or Bristol Ten-seater, with the registration G-EAWY first flew on 21 June 1921. The Ten-seater was a large, two-bay biplane, with a cabin for nine passengers and a forward cockpit for the single pilot.

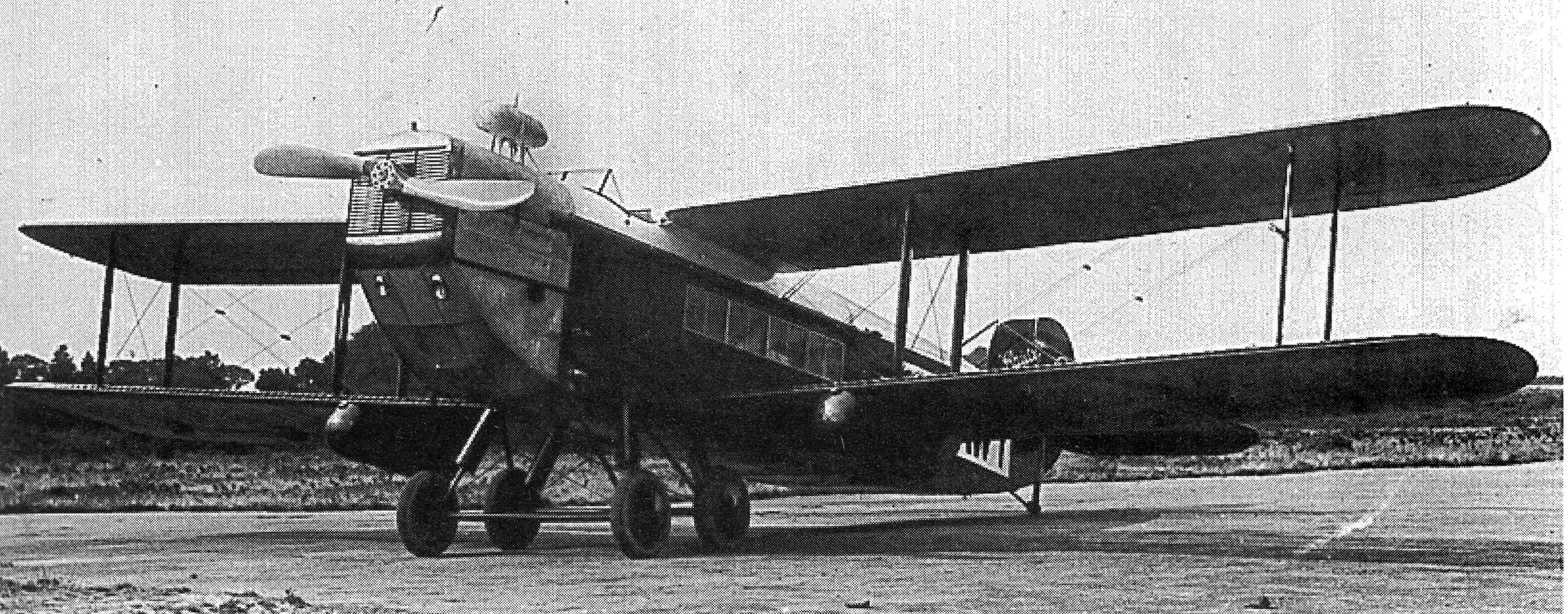
Ten-seater in 1921

The second aircraft, the Bristol Type 75 was powered by the preferred Jupiter engine, which was mounted forward of a fireproof bulkhead, with the entire engine installation (or "power-egg") capable of being swung open like a gate to allow easy access to the rear of the engine. The Type 75 was designed to accommodate eight passengers and two crew. This aircraft, registered G-EBEV, first flew in July 1922. A third aircraft, the Bristol Type 79 was ordered by the Air Council to meet a requirement (Specification 32/22) for a single-engined ambulance landplane for the Royal Air Force. It was fitted with wings of greater chord, and had accommodation for three stretchers and an attendant or two stretchers and four sitting patients.

== Operational history ==
The Type 62 had its Certificate of Airworthiness awarded on 14 February 1922 and was transferred to Instone Air Line for service on its London-to-Paris route, carrying both passengers and cargo. It was later transferred to Handley Page Transport Ltd.

The Type 75 received its Certificate of Airworthiness on 16 July 1924. By this time, Instone Air Lines had merged with the other three subsidised British airlines to form Imperial Airways. Imperial had a policy of using only multi-engine aircraft for passenger flights, so the Type 75 was converted into a freighter to carry 1,800 lb (820 kg) of cargo, going into service on the London-Cologne route on 22 July 1924, continuing in service until 1926.

The Type 79 first flew on 19 March 1924 and was delivered to the RAF, who named the aircraft the Bristol Brandon in 1925. It was overweight at full load and did not go into overseas service, being used as an ambulance at RAF Halton together with the Avro Andover.

== Variants ==
Bristol Type 62
First aircraft, powered by 450 hp (340 kW) Napier Lion engine.
Bristol Type 75
Second aircraft, powered by 425 hp ( kW) Bristol Jupiter IV engine.
Bristol Type 79
Third aircraft built as a military transport and air ambulance aircraft for the RAF. Powered by Bristol Jupiter IV engine.

== Operators ==
United Kingdom

- Royal Air Force
- Handley Page Transport
- Imperial Airways
- Instone Air Line

== Specifications (Type 75) ==
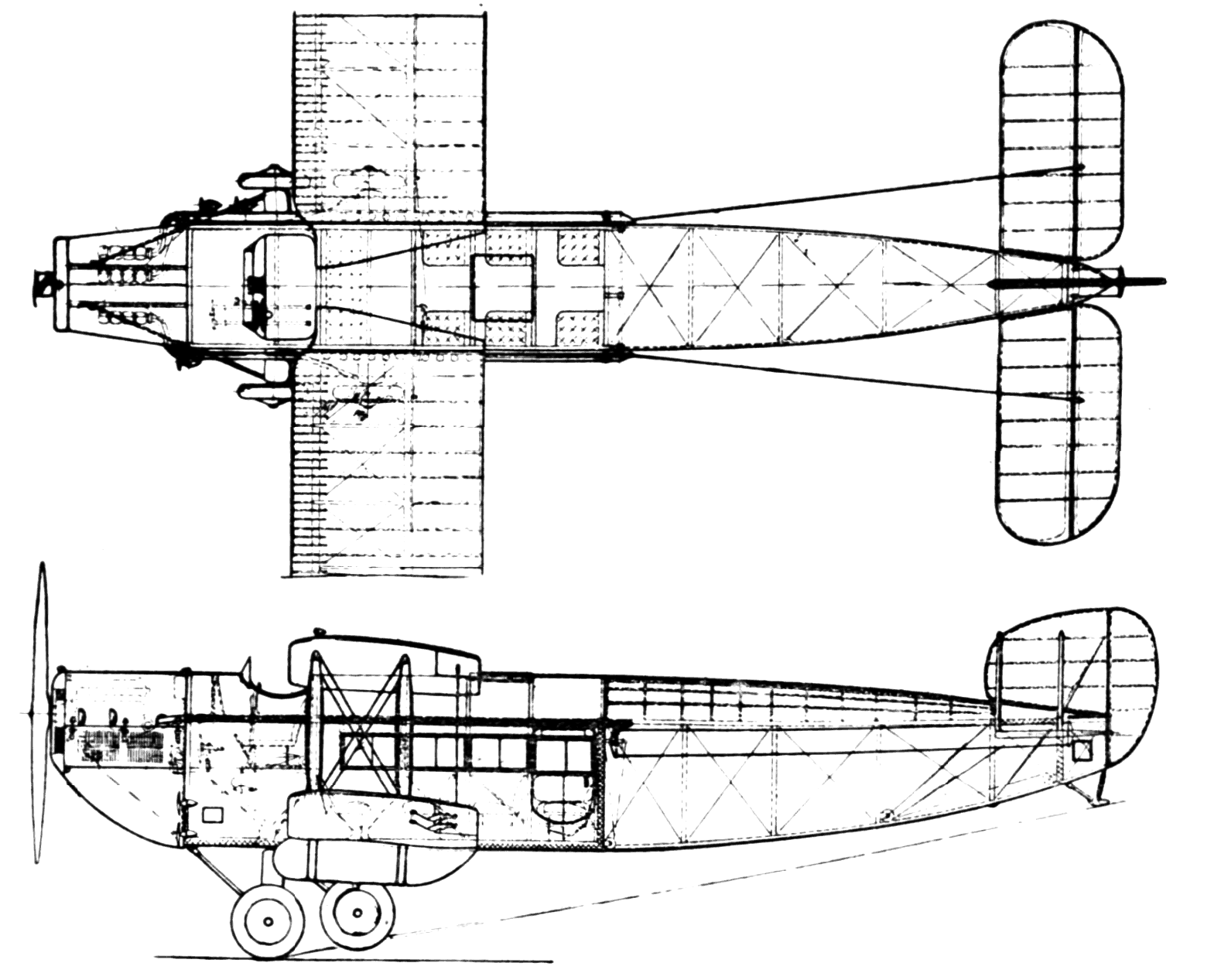
Bristol Ten Seater 2-view .drawing from L'Aéronautique July 1921

Data from Bristol Aircraft Since 1910.

General characteristics

- Crew: 2
- Capacity: 8 passengers / 1,800 lb (816 kg) payload
- Length: 40 ft 6 in (12.34 m)
- Wingspan: 56 ft 0 in (17.07 m)
- Height: 11 ft 0 in (3.35 m)
- Wing area: 700 sq ft (65 m^{2})
- Empty weight: 4,000 lb (1,814 kg)
- Gross weight: 6,755 lb (3,064 kg)
- Powerplant: 1 × Bristol Jupiter IV 8-cylinder air-cooled radial piston engine, 425 hp (317 kW)
- Propellers: 2-bladed fixed-pitch propeller

Performance

- Maximum speed: 110 mph (180 km/h, 96 kn)
- Endurance: 5 hours 30 minutes
- Service ceiling: 8,500 ft (2,600 m)
- Wing loading: 9.65 lb/sq ft (47.1 kg/m^{2})
- Power/mass: 0.063 hp/lb (0.104 kW/kg)

== See also ==
Aircraft of comparable role, configuration, and era

- Avro Andover
- De Havilland DH.18
- De Havilland DH.34
