= 1928 in aviation =

This is a list of aviation-related events from 1928:

== Events ==
- The Soviet Union's first five-year plan (1928–1932) begins, placing a high priority on the construction of new aircraft factories. It begins a rapid expansion of the Soviet aircraft industry.
- The Aeromarine Plane and Motor Company renames itself the Aeromarine-Klemm Corporation and begins to produce the German-designed Klemm aircraft.
- The Douglas Company renames itself the Douglas Aircraft Company.
- The Kawanishi Aircraft Company is founded.
- The Mitsubishi Internal Combustion Engine Company Ltd. changes its name to Mitsubishi Aircraft Company Ltd.
- Italy officially records its production rate for military aircraft at 150 per month, with a capacity to expand to 600 per month in wartime. The Regia Aeronautica (Italian Royal Air Force), meanwhile, determines that it will require a production rate of 900 aircraft per month during a war.
- The United States Coast Guard establishes an Aviation Section at its headquarters.
- Frank Hawks makes a nationwide goodwill tour of the United States for Texaco piloting the custom-built Ford Trimotor Texaco One. He visits more than 150 cities and covers approximately 51,000 miles (82,000 km). An estimated 500,000 people see Texaco One, and Hawks carries 7,200 passengers in the plane without mishap.
- Twenty-three-year-old Karolina Iwaszkiewicz becomes the first woman from Poland to earn a pilot's license.
- At the Langley Memorial Aeronautical Laboratory at Langley Field in Hampton, Virginia, the National Advisory Committee for Aeronautics (NACA) begins the operation of a refrigerated wind tunnel, which gives researchers the ability to study icing on wings and propellers.
- German President Paul von Hindenburg founds the Hindenburg Cup (German: Hindenburg-Pokal) to recognize achievements in powered flight. An additional prize for gliding will be awarded beginning in 1930.

=== January ===
- Hoping to become the first person to fly a small, open-cockpit plane solo from South Africa to London, Mary, Lady Heath, takes off in an Avro Avian for what she hopes will be a three-week trip. Instead, the trip will take three months, and she will not arrive in London until May.
- To advertise Texaco, Frank Hawks flies a Texas delegation in the custom-built Ford Trimotor Texaco One from Houston, Texas, to Mexico City, Mexico. The first goodwill trade extension air tour from the United States to Mexico, the flight receives widespread coverage in American and Mexican newspapers.
- January 6–8 – United States Marine Corps First Lieutenant Christian Schilt makes ten flights in an O2U Corsair to evacuate wounded Marines from an airfield hacked out of the jungle at the village of Quilali, Nicaragua, which is besieged by the guerrilla forces of Augusto César Sandino. Schilt will receive the Medal of Honor for the flights.
- January 10 – John Moncrieff and George Hood disappear while attempting the first trans-Tasman Sea flight between Australia and New Zealand in the Ryan B-1 Brougham Aotearoa (registration G-AUNZ). No trace of them or their aircraft ever is found. Theirs is the first aircraft ever to disappear without trace in or near New Zealand.
- January 15 – The United States Department of Commerce's Aeronautics Branch (predecessor of the Federal Aviation Administration) publishes a list of newly licensed pilots that includes James Herman Banning as the holder of a limited commercial license. He is the first known African American to receive a United States Government pilot license.
- January 16 – Pan American Airways (the future Pan American World Airways) begins scheduled passenger service between Key West, Florida, and Havana, Cuba, its first scheduled international passenger service. It had begun regular air mail service on the route in October 1927.
- January 24
  - French aviator Antoine Paillard breaks the international speed record for an airplane carrying a 1,000 kg (2,205 lb) payload, reaching 218.427 km/h (135.724 mph) in the Bernard 18T Ingénieur Hubert at Istres, France.
  - Witnessed by Henry Ford, Harry J. Brooks, chief test pilot of the Stout Metal Airplane Division of the Ford Motor Company, takes off from Ford Airport in Dearborn, Michigan, in the third prototype of the Ford Flivver in an attempt to set a new record for an unrefueled flight by a C-class airplane — i.e., an airplane that weighs between 200 and 400 kg (441 and 882 lb) — by flying nonstop to Miami, Florida. He falls short of that goal, landing at Asheville, North Carolina.
- January 26 – Veteran movie actor Earl Metcalfe is killed during a flying lesson when he falls or jumps from a plane at an altitude of 2,000 feet (610 meters) over Burbank, California, when it goes into a double roll.
- January 31 – An issue of Domestic Air News — an official publication of the United States Department of Commerce's Aeronautics Branch (the predecessor of the Federal Aviation Administration) — reports an early instance of airplane noise nuisance in the United States in which a poultry farm proprietor in Garrettsville, Ohio, has complained to the Postmaster General of the United States that low-flying airplanes are disrupting egg production at the farm. The Postmaster General had forwarded the proprieter's letter to National Air Transport, the private company operating the New York City-to-Chicago air mail route, suggesting it make a special effort to maintain altitude over Garrettsville.

=== February ===
- The United States Department of Commerce's Aeronautics Branch (predecessor of the Federal Aviation Administration) completes the second of two series of flight tests — both conducted on the New York City-to-Cleveland, Ohio, airway — of a practical radio navigation beacon system. It had begun the first series of flight tests in July 1927.
- February 3 – New York City decides to build its first municipal airport.
- February 7–22 – Australian aviator Bert Hinkler makes the first solo flight from England to Australia, flying from Croydon to Darwin in an Avro Avian. His flight sets a new time world record for an England-to-Australia flight of just under 15½ days, smashing the previous record of 28 days. He then flies on to Bundaberg, Queensland, Australia, arriving there on February 27.
- February 12 – Mary, Lady Heath leaves Cape Town in an Avro Avian in an attempt to make the first solo flight by a woman from South Africa to England. She will arrive in Croydon on May 17.
- February 13 – Charles Lindbergh arrives in St. Louis, Missouri, completing a goodwill tour of Latin America at the controls of the Spirit of St. Louis which started with a nonstop flight from Washington, D.C. to Mexico City on December 13–14, 1927, and included stops elsewhere in Mexico and in Guatemala, British Honduras, El Salvador, Honduras, Nicaragua, Costa Rica, Panama, Colombia, Venezuela, the Virgin Islands, Puerto Rico, the Dominican Republic, Haiti and Cuba.
- February 15 – Aeroput, the flag carrier of the Kingdom of Yugoslavia and Yugoslavia's first civilian airline, makes its first flight, a 2-hour 25-minute trip from Belgrade International Airport in Belgrade to Borongaj Airfield in Zagreb by a Potez 29/2 (registration X-SECD) carrying two pilots and five journalists and news photographers. The airliner makes passes over Zagreb before landing. In the afternoon, the airliner returns to Belgrade, again carrying journalists as passengers.
- February 20 – The Havana Convention on Commercial Aviation is adopted by the delegates to the Sixth International Conference of American States at Havana, Cuba. It governs aeronautical navigation in the Western Hemisphere, including provisions relating to marking of aircraft, landing facilities, prohibited transport, competency of airmen, registration of aircraft, prohibited areas, and the rights of each country to prescribe the route to be followed over its territory by the aircraft of other countries.
- February 21 – Witnessed by Edsel Ford, Harry J. Brooks, chief test pilot of the Stout Metal Airplane Division of the Ford Motor Company, takes off from Ford Airport in Dearborn, Michigan, in the second prototype of the Ford Flivver in a second attempt to set a new record for an unrefueled flight by a C-class airplane — i.e., an airplane that weighs between 200 and 400 kg (441 and 882 lb) — by flying nonstop to Miami, Florida. He lands 200 miles (322 km) short of Miami, landing at Titusville, Florida, but nonetheless sets a distance record of 972 miles (1,564 km).
- February 25
  - Over Villacoublay airfield in Villacoublay, France, French pilot Alfred Fronval sets a world record for consecutive loop-the-loops, completing 1,111 loops in 4 hours 56 minutes.
  - After taking off from Titusville, Florida, to complete his flight to Miami, Florida, Harry J. Brooks is circling over the Atlantic Ocean when his Ford Flivver's engine quits. The plane crashes into the sea off Melbourne, Florida, killing him. The airplane's wreckage washes up on shore, but his body is never found.

=== March ===
- Fourteen months after its liquidation, the French aircraft manufacturer Dewoitine is reestablished as Société Aéronautique Française (or Avions Dewoitine).
- March 1 – The British aircraft carrier HMS Courageous enters service as the world's first aircraft carrier with transverse arresting gear.
- March 5 – de Havilland Canada is established by de Havilland as a Canadian subsidiary.
- March 8 – The Foreign Air Mail Act becomes law in the United States. It expands the role of the United States Post Office Department in international mail by giving it new authority to award contracts for periods of up to ten years for the transportation of mail by air to foreign countries and to U.S. insular areas.
- March 12 – Attempting to set a new world airspeed record, South African pilot Flight Lieutenant Samuel M. "Kinky" Kinkead, commander of the Royal Air Force High Speed Flight and a decorated World War I flying ace, dies when his Supermarine S.5 seaplane, N221, suddenly nose-dives into the Solent off England's Isle of Wight.
- March 26 – The Italian Secretary of State for Air, Italo Balbo, founds the airline Società Aerea Mediterranea (SAM) as an early step toward an Italian Fascist government takeover of all Italian airlines and rationalization of their routes.
- March 30 – Mario de Bernardi sets a new airspeed record of 512.776 km/h (318.624 mph) at Venice, Italy – the first over 300 mph (483 km/h) and the first over 500 km/h (311 mph). He flies a Macchi M.52bis.

=== April ===
- The Imperial Japanese Navy begins to experiment with coordinated torpedo attacks by aircraft and surface ships. It will not abandon the concept as impractical until the mid-1930s.
- April 1 – The Imperial Japanese Navy forms its first seagoing aircraft carrier organization, the First Carrier Division.
- April 3–5 – The French Air Force's Amiot 122 BP2 prototype bomber makes a 10,100 km (6,280 mi; 5,450 nmi) flight from Paris to Timbuktu to Dakar and back to Paris, crossing the Sahara along the way.
- April 12–13 – With the aircraft's owner — the German aviation pioneer Ehrenfried Günther Freiherr von Hünefeld — aboard as a passenger, Deutsche Luft Hansa pilot Hermann Köhl and Irish Air Corps pilot Major James Fitzmaurice fly in a Junkers W.33 named Bremen from Baldonnel Airodrome in the Irish Free State to a crash landing on Greenly Island on the south coast of Labrador in the Dominion of Newfoundland. Although the aviators fall short of their goal of flying nonstop to New York City, they are credited with the first non-stop flight across the Atlantic Ocean from east to west.
- April 14 – In the Breguet 19 G.R. Nungesser-Coli, the French aviators Dieudonné Costes and Joseph Le Brix complete a round-the-world flight they had begun on October 10, 1927, traveling 57,410 km (35,670 mi) with a total flying time of 350 hours, although they have covered the segment between San Francisco, California, and Tokyo, Japan, aboard ship. Their route has taken them from Paris to Senegal, Argentina, Brazil, the United States, Japan, India, Greece, and back to Paris, and has included the first aerial crossing of the South Atlantic Ocean and flights to every country in South America.
- April 15–21 – Australian explorer George Hubert Wilkins and American pilot Carl Ben Eielson make the first flight across the Arctic in a heavier-than-air aircraft, flying from Point Barrow in the Territory of Alaska to Spitsbergen, Norway, in a Lockheed Vega. The 3,540 km (2,200 mi) journey is the first flight over the Arctic from North America to Europe and includes 21 hours in the air and a five-day layover at Deadman's Island (Likholmen) off Spitsbergen's northeast coast.
- April 25 – Floyd Bennett, after whom Floyd Bennett Field will be named, dies in Quebec City of pneumonia, developed during a rescue flight to Greenly Island, in the Strait of Belle Isle northwest of Newfoundland, to save the crew of the German airplane Bremen, which had crash-landed after flying the Atlantic.
- April 27 – Regia Aeronautica (Italian Royal Air Force) General Alessandro Guidoni is killed at Montecelio, Italy, when a new model of parachute he personally is testing fails. In 1937, the town and surrounding comune will be renamed Guidonia Montecelio in his honor.

=== May ===
- Sumitoshi Nakao becomes the first Japanese aviator to save his life by parachute when he bails out of one of two Mitsubishi 1MF2 Hayabusa-type fighter prototypes when it disintegrates during a diving test during official Imperial Japanese Army trials at Tokorozawa. He is uninjured.
- Brothers Thomas Elmer Braniff and Paul Revere Braniff found their first airline, Tulsa-Oklahoma City Airline. It is owned by Paul R. Braniff, Inc.
- The United States Department of Commerce's Aeronautics Branch (the predecessor of the Federal Aviation Administration) establishes a five-member Aircraft Accident Board to investigate and analyze civil aircraft accidents with a view to determining and eliminating their causes.
- May 1
  - Pitcairn Aviation (the future Eastern Air Lines) begins operations along the United States East Coast as a contract airmail-hauler.
  - When a United States Army Air Corps Curtiss O-1B Falcon carrying Thaddeus C. Sweet, a member of the United States House of Representatives representing New York's 32nd Congressional District, lands in a field near Whitney Point, New York, to escape a thunderstorm, it somersaults, killing Sweet. The pilot is uninjured.
- May 3–5 – Imperial Japanese Army Air Corps aircraft see action in China during the Jinan Incident.
- May 11 – The Ryan NYP Spirit of St. Louis, in which Charles Lindbergh had made the first non-stop transatlantic flight in May 1927, goes on display in the Smithsonian Institution′s Arts and Industries Building in Washington, D.C. It will remain there until 1975, when it is removed for cleaning and restoration before going on display in the Smithsonian's new National Air and Space Museum that opens in Washington, D.C., in July 1976.
- May 15 – The Reverend John Flynn founds the Royal Flying Doctor Service at Cloncurry, Queensland, Australia, using a de Havilland DH.50. The service takes medical services to remote parts of the Australian bush.
- May 16 – Transcontinental Air Transport (TAT), one of the ancestors of the future Trans World Airlines (TWA), is founded. It becomes popularly known as the "Lindbergh Line" because of Charles Lindbergh's involvement in it. Unusually for a U.S. airline of the time, TAT emphasizes passenger travel rather than the transportation of air mail.
- May 17
  - Mary, Lady Heath, arrives at Croydon Aerodrome in London, completing a 9,000-mile (14,500-kilometer) flight from South Africa in an Avro Avian, stepping out of the cockpit to greet a cheering crowd wearing a pleated skirt, high heels, a fur coat, and a cloche hat. When she had begun the journey in South Africa in January, she had hoped to complete the flight in three weeks, but various setbacks – including a crash-landing outside Southern Rhodesia after she suffered heat stroke – have led to the trip taking three months. She becomes the first person to fly from South Africa to London solo in a small, open-cockpit plane.
  - During Fleet Problem VIII, the United States Navy aircraft carrier USS Langley (CV-1) launches 35 aircraft off the Hawaiian Islands which carry out a successful simulated surprise "attack" against United States Army defenders in the Territory of Hawaii. It is the first in a series of U.S. Navy exercises experimenting with the use of carrier aircraft in surprise attacks against enemy ports and bases.
  - In an era when mail contracts provided virtually the only profitable form of airline operation in the United States, an amendment to the Air Mail Act of 1925 permits that U.S. air carriers that had operated satisfactorily on air mail routes for at least two years could exchange their mail contracts for "air mail route certificates" for a period not to exceed 10 years. The amendment protects the investments airlines had made in the equipment necessary for carrying out their original mail contracts because the life of that equipment was considerably longer than the life of those contracts.
- May 23 – With Umberto Nobile in command, the Italian airship Italia sets out on her ill-fated third Arctic flight, during which she will fly over the North Pole. Italia will crash on her way back.
- May 25 – Sixty-one Regia Aeronautica (Italian Royal Air Force) seaplanes – 51 Savoia-Marchetti S.59bis and 10 Savoia-Marchetti S.55s – led by General Italo Balbo set out from Orbetello, Italy, on a six-stage, mass-formation flight circuiting the Western Mediterranean. The flight is intended to improve the operational skills of Regia Aeronautica aircrews and ground crewmen, showcase the Italian aviation industry to potential foreign buyers of Italian-made aircraft, and enhance the prestige of Benito Mussolini's Italian Fascist government.
- May 31 – Bound for Brisbane, Australia, in the Fokker F.VIIb/3m Southern Cross, Australian aviators Charles Kingsford Smith and Charles Ulm and their crew of two Americans take off from Oakland, California, heading for Honolulu on the first leg of an attempt to make the first flight across the Pacific Ocean.

=== June ===
- June 2 – Sixty-one Regia Aeronautica (Italian Royal Air Force) seaplanes – 51 Savoia-Marchetti S.59bis and 10 Savoia-Marchetti S.55s – led by General Italo Balbo return to Italy after a six-stage, 1,750-mile (2,818-km) mass-formation flight circuiting the Western Mediterranean. Since departing Italy on May 25, the aircraft have completed the journey in six segments of three or four hours' flying time each. Their stops have included Cagliari, Sardinia; Tortosa, Spain, and Marseille, France.
- June 3 – Italian aviators Arturo Ferrarin and Carlo Del Prete complete a nonstop flight in the Savoia-Marchetti S.64 begun on May 31 during which they have made 51 round trips between Torre Flavia (in Ladispoli) and Anzio. The flight breaks three world records, setting a new world nonstop distance record over a closed circuit of 7,666 kilometers (4,763 miles), a new world endurance record of 58 hours 34 minutes, and a new world record for average speed over a distance of 5,000 kilometers (3,107 miles) of 139 km/h (86 mph).
- June 9 – Piloting the Fokker F.VIIb/3m Southern Cross, Australian aviators Charles Kingsford Smith and Charles Ulm and their crew of two Americans complete the first flight across the Pacific Ocean. They had left Oakland, California, on May 31 and reach Brisbane via Honolulu and Fiji. The nine-day journey includes 83 hours of flight time.
- June 11
  - At the Wasserkuppe, Alexander Lippisch's Ente becomes as part of Opel RAK program by Max Valier and Fritz von Opel the first aircraft to fly under rocket power, completing a 1,500-meter (4,921-foot) circuit of the landing strip.
  - In response to a December 1927 United States-Mexico flight by Charles Lindbergh, Emilio Carranza departs Valbuena Field, Mexico City, Mexico, in The Excelsior-Mexico, a Ryan Brougham B-1, to attempt a non-stop goodwill flight to Washington, D.C. Unable to navigate using U.S. Airmail light beacons because of fog, he instead lands at approximately 3:00 a.m. on June 12 in Mooresville, North Carolina. Carranza departs Mooresville early on the afternoon of June 12 and flies on to Bolling Field in Washington, D.C., where he arrives at about 5:15 p.m. and is greeted by United States Under Secretary of State Robert E. Olds, Mexican Ambassador Manuel C. Tellez, other officials, and spectators. On June 13, he has lunch with President Calvin Coolidge at the Pan American Union Building in Washington, D.C. Later, Carranza flies to Roosevelt Field on Long Island, New York.
- June 17–18 – Aviator Amelia Earhart becomes the first woman to make a successful transatlantic flight, flying as a passenger in a Fokker F.VIIb/3m piloted by Wilmer Stultz from the Dominion of Newfoundland to Wales.
- June 18 – A Latham 47 flying boat carrying Norwegian polar explorer Roald Amundsen and five others on a flight to search for survivors of the Italian airship Italia disappears. Their bodies are never found.
- June 20 – Tulsa-Oklahoma City Airline, the first airline founded by brothers Thomas Elmer Braniff and Paul Revere Braniff, begins operations, using a single, five-passenger Stinson Detroiter to offer service between Oklahoma City, Oklahoma, and Tulsa, Oklahoma.
- June 30
  - The United States Department of Commerce's Aeronautics Branch (predecessor of the Federal Aviation Administration) has issued a total of 47 type certificates to aircraft.
  - The fourth Ford National Reliability Air Tour begins, with contestants taking off from Ford Airport in Dearborn, Michigan, during the airport's "Air Olympics Day." It coincides with the 22nd annual James Gordon Bennett Balloon Race, which begins at the airport the same day as soon as the tour airplanes have departed. Flying a Monocoupe, Phoebe Omlie becomes the first female air tour pilot. The tour cross-markets Ford Motor Company and its Stout Metal Airplane Division and showcases Henry Ford's interest in aviation.
  - Since January 1, there have been 390 civil aviation accidents in the United States, of which 34 have occurred in scheduled flying, 69 in student instruction, 17 in experimental operations, and 270 in other types of flights. Assigned causes blame pilot error for 43.29 percent of the accidents, engine failure for 16.59 percent, weather for 10.23 percent, and airport or terrain for 8.72 percent. The accidents have resulted in 153 fatalities — only six of them in scheduled flights — and 276 injuries.

=== July ===
- July 3–5 – Italian aviators Arturo Ferrarin and Carlo Del Prete set a new nonstop flight distance record, flying a Savoia-Marchetti S.64 from Montecelio, Italy, to Brazil. Departing on July 3 and hoping to reach Rio de Janeiro, they are forced to turn back due to bad weather and attempt to land at Natal, Brazil, but their flight ends in a forced landing on a beach at Touros, Brazil, on July 5 after they remain airborne for 48 hours 14 minutes and cover 8,100 kilometers (5,000 miles) nonstop. The Fédération Aéronautique Internationale recognizes the flight as establishing a new official nonstop distance record of 7,188 kilometers (4,466 miles), the great-circle distance between Montecelio and Natal.
- July 4 – While crossing the English Channel with several other people during a flight from Croydon, England, to Brussels, Belgium, aboard his private Fokker F.VII trimotor, wealthy Belgian financier Alfred Loewenstein excuses himself to visit the lavatory. When he does not return, his secretary investigates and finds the lavatory empty, the aircraft's adjacent entrance door open, and Loewenstein missing from the plane, having jumped or fallen thousands of feet to his death. His body will be discovered in the sea near Boulogne, France, on July 19.
- July 12 – Mexican aviation pioneer Emilio Carranza is killed in the crash of his Ryan Brougham The Mexico Excelsior in the New Jersey Pine Barrens near Tabernacle, New Jersey, when he flies into a thunderstorm during an attempt to fly non-stop from Roosevelt Field on Long Island, New York, to Mexico City, Mexico.*
- July 13 – The Imperial Airways Vickers Vulcan G-EBLB crashes near Purley, Surrey, in the United Kingdom, during a test flight, killing four of the six people on board. After the crash, Imperial Airways ends the practice of allowing airline staff to take "joy rides" during test flights.
- July 27 – Irish-born aviator Mary, Lady Heath, becomes the first woman appointed as a co-pilot with a civil airline, KLM.
- July 28 – The fourth Ford National Reliability Air Tour concludes with the arrival of the contestants at Ford Airport in Dearborn, Michigan. Since departing Dearborn on June 30, the four-week-long tour has followed a 6,304-mile (5,478 nmi; 10,145 km) route with stops at the Indianapolis Speedway in Speedway, Indiana; St. Louis and Springfield, Missouri; Wichita, Kansas; Tulsa, Oklahoma; Fort Worth, Waco, San Antonio, Marfa, and El Paso, Texas; Tucson and Yuma, Arizona; San Diego, Los Angeles, Fresno, San Francisco, and Corning, California; Medford and Portland, Oregon; Tacoma and Spokane, Washington; Missoula, Great Falls, and Froid, Montana; Minot and Fargo, North Dakota; St. Paul, Minnesota; Wausau and Milwaukee, Wisconsin; Chicago, Illinois, and Battle Creek, Michigan. The itinerary had placed the competitors in San Francisco at Mills Field Municipal Airport (the future San Francisco International Airport) while the World War I flying movie Hell's Angels was filming there. John P. Wood wins in the Waco 10 The Baby Ruth. Also among the finishers is Phoebe Omlie — the first female air tour pilot — in a Monocoupe. During the air tour, she becomes the first female aviator to fly across the Rocky Mountains.

=== August ===
- The Daily Mail newspaper fits out a de Havilland DH.61 to use as a mobile press office. It carries its own darkroom and a motorcycle.
- August 1
  - A four-man Spanish Air Force crew led by pilot Major Ramón Franco – brother of future Spanish dictator Francisco Franco – and including copilot/navigator Julio Ruiz de Alda Miqueleiz, takes off from Cádiz, Spain, in the Dornier Do R Superwal ("Super Whale") flying boat Numancia to attempt a 20-stage, 25,000-mile (40,258-km) westward flight around the world, heading for their first stop at the Azores. Mechanical problems force Franco to make an emergency landing on the Gulf of Cádiz off Faro, Portugal, and the attempt is scrubbed.
  - Twenty of the 48 U.S. states still lack aeronautical legislation, and as a first step toward promoting uniform state aeronautical legislation in the states consistent with U.S. Federal law, the United States Department of Commerce's Aeronautics Branch (predecessor of the Federal Aviation Administration) issues a bulletin reviewing the various state statutes and setting forth suggested drafts of required laws.
- August 8 – The Couzinet 27 Arc en Ciel II crashes in France during trials. Its mechanic dies instantly and its pilot dies of his injuries a few days later, leaving only survivor of the crash.
- August 9 – Novice German aviator Friedrich Karl von Koenig-Warthausen sets out in a Klemm Daimler L.20B from Berlin Tempelhof Airport in Berlin intending to fly to Moscow. After arriving there, he will continually extend his journey, ultimately concluding it in Hannover, Germany, in November 1929. Although his 15-month trip includes segments traveled by ship, he will be recognized as the first person to complete a solo flight around the world largely by airplane.
- August 11 – Only a little over five weeks after completing their record-breaking Italy-Brazil flight, Italian aviators Arturo Ferrarin and Carlo Del Prete are injured in the crash during a demonstration flight of a Savoia-Marchetti SM.62 flying boat during ongoing post-flight celebrations in Brazil. Del Prete will die of his injuries on August 16.
- August 19 – The Italian Fascist leader Italo Balbo is given the rank of general of the air force in the Regia Aeronautica (Italian Royal Air Force).
- August 25 – An attempt by the French World War I flying ace Louis Coudouret and two other men to fly from Paris to New York City and make what would have been the first French nonstop transatlantic flight fails when their fuel-laden plane, the Bernard 191GR La France, fails to gain altitude on takeoff from Le Bourget. It narrowly misses trees, telegraph lines, and electric power lines and scrapes its landing gear along the roof of a house before the men dump their reserve fuel, allowing the plane to climb. After circling the airfield for seven minutes, the shaken aviators land safely.

=== September ===
- September 10–11 – Charles Kingsford Smith and crew make the first successful trans-Tasman flight.
- September 12 – The Norwegian whaling ship C. A. Larsen departs Naval Air Station Norfolk, Virginia, bound for Antarctica carrying the four aircraft — the Ford 4-AT-B Trimotor Floyd Bennett, the Fokker Super Universal The Virginia (NC4453), the Fairchild FC-2W2 Stars and Stripes, and a G.A.C. 102 Aristocrat — of Richard E. Byrd's first Antarctic expedition. All but the Aristocrat are destined to operate in Antarctica, and Floyd Bennett will become the first airplane to fly over the South Pole in November 1929.
- September 18
  - Don Juan de la Cierva flies a Cierva C.8 autogyro from Croydon, England, to Le Bourget, France, making the first crossing of the English Channel in a rotary wing aircraft. He makes the 40-kilometer (25-mile) crossing of the Channel in 18 minutes at an altitude of 4,000 feet (1,200 meters).
  - The German dirigible Graf Zeppelin makes its first flight. It will go on to become the most successful rigid airship in history, spending 16,000 hours in the air, flying more than 1 million mi (0.87 million nmi; 1.6 million km), and carrying 13,100 passengers by the time it leaves service in 1937.
  - German aviation pioneer Ehrenfried Günther Freiherr von Hünefeld and Swedish pilot Karl Gunnar Lindner take off from Berlin in the Junkers W 33 Europa in an attempt to fly around the world.
- September 19 – The Packard Motor Car Company flight-tests the first diesel engine to power a heavier-than-air craft.
- September 21 – Von Hünefeld and Lindner arrive at Bushire, Iran, where they meet the German pilot Friedrich Karl von Koenig-Warthausen, who will go on to complete the first solo circumnavigation of the world principally by air.
- September 25 – Over France near Paris, Baron Willy Coppens, Belgium's top scoring fighter ace of World War I, sets a new world parachute record, descending safely from an altitude of 6,000 meters (19,700 feet).
- September 30 – By the end of September, wind tunnel tests of "Cowling No. 10" by the U.S. National Advisory Committee on Aeronautics (NACA) have demonstrated not only that it cools an engine more efficiently than leaving an engine's cylinders open to the air, but also — to the surprise of engineers — that it reduces aerodynamic drag by a factor of 2.6 compared to any other cowling. It will become known as the "NACA cowling." Later tests of the cowling on a United States Army Air Corps Curtiss AT-5A trainer demonstrate that it also could significantly increase an aircraft's maximum speed, in the case of the AT-5A from 118 miles per hour (103 kn; 190 km/h) to 137 or 138 miles per hour (119 or 120 kn; 220 or 222 km/h).

=== October ===
- October 10 – Flying a United States Army Air Corps Engineering Division XCO-5 observation aircraft, St. Clair "Bill" Streett (pilot) and Albert William Stevens (passenger) set an unofficial altitude record for an aircraft carrying a passenger of 11,538 meters (37,854 feet). Temperatures of −61 °C (−78 °F) freeze the controls, preventing Streett from losing altitude or turning off the engine; he waits 20 minutes for the engine to run out of gasoline (petrol), then glides to a deadstick landing.
- October 11 – The dirigible Graf Zeppelin completes a crossing of the Atlantic Ocean in 71 hours.
- October 20 – German aviation pioneer Ehrenfried Günther Freiherr von Hünefeld and Swedish pilot Karl Gunnar Lindner arrive in Tokyo, Japan in the Junkers W 33 Europa two days behind schedule during their attempt to fly around the world. They will abandon their attempt on October 25 before trying to cross the Pacific Ocean because of unfavorable weather and von Hünefeld's declining health. During their journey, which began in Berlin on September 18, they have made stops at Sofia, Bulgaria; Bushire, Iran; Calcutta, India; Hanoi, French Indochina; and Canton and Shanghai, China. The Calcutta-Hanoi leg of their flight had covered 1,200 miles (1,000 nmi; 1,900 km) nonstop.
- October 31 – There are 3,659 pilots holding active licenses in the United States, of which 66.3 percent are transport licenses, 10.5 percent are limited commercial licenses, l.7 percent are industrial licenses, and 21.5 percent are private licenses. A year before, transport pilots had accounted for 85 percent of the total licenses, and their reduced percentage is due to the faster growth of private flying between November 1927 and October 1928.

=== November ===
- The Aeronautical Corporation of America is incorporated at Cincinnati, Ohio. It will change its name to Aeronca Aircraft Corporation in 1941.
- The Washington, D.C., office of the U.S. National Advisory Committee on Aeronautics (NACA) announces to the press that aircraft manufacturers could install the new low-drag NACA cowling as an airplane's standard equipment for about US$25 per aircraft and that the possible annual savings from the aircraft industry's use of the cowling was in excess of US$5 million.
- November 20 – French aviator Antoine Paillard sets a world speed record for an aircraft over a 1,000 km (621 mi) course with a 1,000 kg (2,205 lb) payload, averaging 223.546 km/h (138.905 mph) in a Bernard 191GR.
- November 23 – French aviator Antoine Paillard sets a world speed record for an aircraft over a 100 km (62.1 mi) course with a 2,000 kg (4,409 lb) payload, averaging 223.55 km/h (138.91 mph) in a Bernard 191GR.
- November 24 – María Bernaldo de Quirós becomes the first woman in Spain to be awarded a pilot's licence.

=== December ===
- Australian explorer George Hubert Wilkins and American Carl Ben Eielson take off from Deception Island in a Lockheed Vega and make the first successful airplane flight over Antarctica, flying along the eastern coast of the Antarctic Peninsula. They continue to fly over Antarctica during the Southern Hemisphere summer of 1928–1929, charting several previously unknown islands.
- December 4 – The United States Department of Commerce's Aeronautics Branch (predecessor of the Federal Aviation Administration) issues regulations covering the entry and clearance of aircraft carrying foreign cargo and passengers into the United States. The rules will become effective on February 1, 1929.
- December 6 – North American Aviation Inc. is founded.
- December 12 – Royal Air Force Vickers Victorias evacuate British civilians from Kabul, Afghanistan.
- December 12–14 – The International Civil Aeronautics Conference — suggested by President Calvin Coolidge and authorized by the United States Congress — holds sessions in Washington, D.C., with 325 Americans and 77 official and 39 unofficial delegates from other countries participating. Participants exchange views on problems pertaining to aircraft in international commerce and give presentations on a variety of aviation topics.
- December 15–17 – French aviators Dieudonné Costes and Paul Codos set a world distance record for flight over a closed circuit, flying 8,029 km (4,989 mi).
- December 17 – Participants in the International Civil Aeronautics Conference attend ceremonies at Kill Devil Hills, North Carolina, to commemorate the 25th anniversary of the first flight of the Wright brothers. Orville Wright is the guest of honor.
- December 19 – At Willow Grove, Pennsylvania, Harold Pitcairn flies his first autogyro. It is the first autogyro flight in the United States.
- December 20 – Pilot Carl Ben Eielson carries explorer Hubert Wilkins in the first extended flight over Antarctica, using Lockheed Vega Los Angeles flying from Deception Island. They fly the entire length of Graham Land.
- December 25 – Richard E. Byrd's first Antarctic expedition arrives by ship off the Ross Ice Shelf in Antarctica with three disassembled and crated aircraft — the Ford 4-AT-B Trimotor Floyd Bennett, the Fokker Super Universal The Virginia (NC4453), and the Fairchild FC-2W2 Stars and Stripes — aboard. Days later, the expedition's members begin to set up a base, Little America, on the Ross Ice Shelf, from which they will begin air operations in January 1929 and from which Byrd will make the first flight over the South Pole aboard Floyd Bennett in November 1929.

== First flights ==
- Bellanca CH-200
- Bernard 190
- Blackburn Lincock
- Couzinet 27 Arc en Ciel II
- Curtiss P-5 Superhawk
- Dewoitine D.27
- Eastman E-2 Sea Rover
- Farman F.160
- Farman F.190
- Focke-Wulf S 2
- Focke-Wulf S 24
- Kreider-Reisner Challenger, first version of the Fairchild KR-34
- Kreider-Reisner KR-21-A, first version of the Fairchild 21
- Latécoère 32
- Levasseur PL.8
- Peyret-Abrial A-5 Rapace
- Piaggio P.8
- Pitcairn PA-6 Super Mailwing
- Potez 32
- Potez 33
- Potez 35
- Westland-Hill Pterodactyl Mk. IA
- Yokosuka K2Y
- Mid-1928 – Stinson Junior
- Autumn 1928 – Polikarpov R-5
- Late 1928 – Saunders A.14

=== January ===
- Command-Aire 3C3
- Eberhart XF2G
- January 7 – Polikarpov Po-2
- January 30 – Westland Witch

=== February ===
- February 21 – Polikarpov I-3
- February 24 – Handley Page Hare

=== March ===
- March 5 - Beardmore Inflexible

=== April ===
- Curtiss XP-3A, prototype of the Curtiss P-3 Hawk
- Mitsubishi MC-1

=== May ===
- Kawanishi K-12 Sakura ("Cherry Blossom")
- Mitsubishi 1MF2 Hayabusa
- Sikorsky S-38
- May 7 – Couzinet 10 Arc en Ciel
- May 22 – Blériot 175

=== June ===
- Amiot 110
- Hawker Hart
- June 24 – Boeing XF4B-1, prototype of the Boeing F4B

=== July ===
- Avro 604 Antelope
- July 27 – Boeing 80
- Late July – G.A.C. 102 Aristocrat

=== August ===
- Levasseur PL.7

=== September ===
- Boeing XP-7
- September 18 – LZ 127 Graf Zeppelin

=== October ===
- October 4 – Butler Blackhawk
- October 23 – Cierva C.17

=== November ===
- Cessna CW-6
- Curtiss XF8C-2, prototype of the Curtiss F8C Helldiver, the first United States Navy dive bomber designed as such
- Hawker Tomtit
- November 14 – Fairey Long-Range Monoplane

=== December ===
- December 7 - De Havilland Hawk Moth

== Entered service ==
=== January ===
- Curtiss F8C-1 Falcon with United States Marine Corps Observation Squadrons 8 and 10.
- January 20 – Boeing F2B with the United States Navy

=== May ===
- Junkers G.31 with Deutsche Luft Hansa

=== June ===
- Westland Wapiti with No. 84 Squadron, Royal Air Force

=== August ===
- Boeing F3B with the United States Navy
- Martin T4M with the United States Navy

=== September ===
- September 20 – Boeing 80 with Boeing Air Transport

=== December ===
- Curtiss F7C Seahawk with United States Marine Corps Fighter Squadron 5 (VF-5M)

== Retirements ==
- Stout 2-AT Pullman
- Westland Wizard
