= Gloster Goring =

Single-engined two-seat biplane

Goring
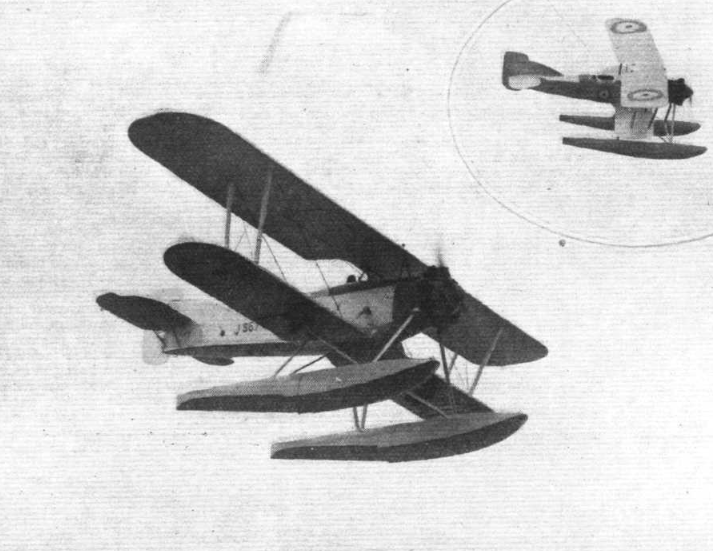

General information
- Type: Torpedo and day bomber
- National origin: United Kingdom
- Manufacturer: Gloster Aircraft Company
- Designer: S.J. Waters
- Number built: 1

History
- First flight: March 1927

The Gloster Goring was a single-engined two-seat biplane designed to meet 1926 Air Ministry specifications for a day/torpedo bomber. It was not put into production and the one aircraft built served later as an engine testbed.

== Development ==
Early in 1926 the Air Ministry issued two specifications, 23/25 for a two-seat day bomber, torpedo bomber and reconnaissance aircraft, followed by 24/25 for a high-altitude bomber. These two specifications brought out prototypes from several makers: the Blackburn Beagle, Handley Page Hare, Hawker Harrier, Vickers Vildebeest and Westland Witch. The Goring was Gloster's submission, aimed, like most of the other machines at both specifications.

The Goring was a single bay biplane with staggered wings of unequal span and slight sweep. They were based on spruce spars with internal wire bracing. The lower wing was angled downwards briefly as it left the fuselage, enabling a shorter-than-usual undercarriage. Short struts ran from the wing joint of this centre section to mid-fuselage. The fuselage was also a wooden structure of rectangular cross-section formed by ash longerons. Wings and fuselage were fabric covered. The pilot sat below the upper wing trailing edge with a cutout for visibility. The gunner sat behind in a second open cockpit fitted with a Scarff ring for a Vickers machine gun. The rear cockpit also allowed the gunner to assume a prone position for bombing. The tailplane was strut braced and the fin was low with a broad chord. Both rudder and elevators had horn balances which projected beyond the fixed surfaces. The standard undercarriage was a simple single axle arrangement, but it could be replaced with a split axle unit to allow the carrying and dropping of torpedoes. In addition the Goring could operate as a seaplane. The floats were accompanied by a rudder enlarged by an extension below the fuselage.

The Goring originally flew in March 1927 with an uncowled direct-drive 425 hp (315 kW) Bristol Jupiter VI. Later in the year this engine was replaced by a geared 460 hp (345 kW) Bristol Jupiter VIII and flew in both land- and seaplane configurations.

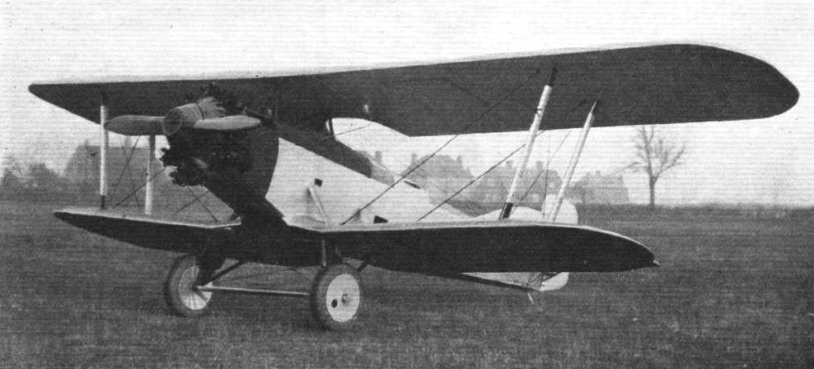
Goring on wheeled undercarriage

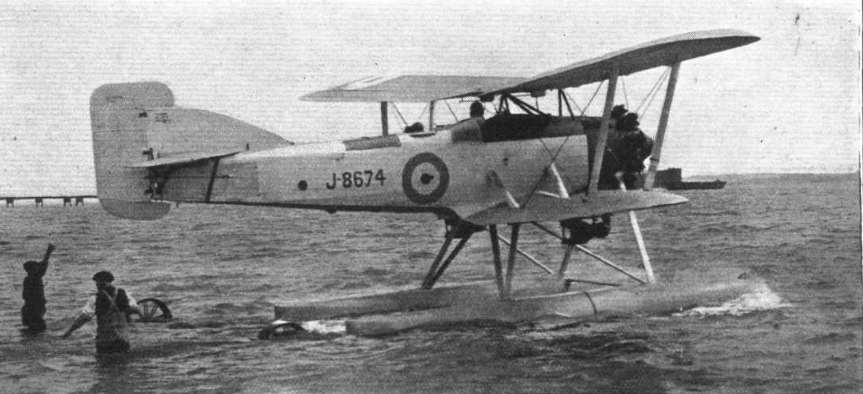
Goring taxying on water

== Operational history ==
At RAF Martlesham Heath in 1928 the Goring powered by the Jupiter VIII competed with the Hare, Harrier and Witch over the 23/25 specification. In the event none of them satisfied the Air Ministry, probably because they had anticipated higher performing aircraft powered by the supercharged Jupiter VII and X variants which had been unavailable owing to development difficulties.

In 1930 the Goring returned to Gloster's works at Hucclecote to be converted once more to a seaplane and it remained in that guise over 1931, doing extensive flying from Calshot. Later it returned as a landplane to test the now airworthy Jupiter XF, at the same time having its fin area reduced by a narrower, straight edged surface.

The Goring's final role was as an engine testbed at Bristol's Filton works where it flew in turn with the 745 hp (555 kW) Bristol Mercury VIIA, the 570 hp (425 kW) Bristol Pegasus II and the sleeve valved 670 hp (500 kW) Bristol Perseus II radial engines, the second and third of these at least within a wide chord cowling.

== Specifications (landplane) ==
Data from James 1971, pp. 144

General characteristics

- Crew: two
- Length: 30 ft 0 in (9.14 m)
- Wingspan: 42 ft 0 in (12.18 m)
- Height: 11 ft 6 in (3.50 m)
- Wing area: 450 sq ft (41.8 m^{2})
- Empty weight: 2,914 lb (1,321 kg)
- Gross weight: 5,650 lb (2,437 kg)
- Powerplant: 1 × Bristol Jupiter VIII 9-cylinder radial , 460 hp (345 kW)

Performance

- Maximum speed: 136 mph (218 km/h, 118 kn) at 4,000 ft (1,219 m)
- Service ceiling: 16,500 ft (5,030 m)
- Rate of climb: 770 ft/min (3.91 m/s) to 10,000 ft (3,050 m)

Armament

- 1×fixed synchronised forward firing 0.303 in (7.7 mm) Vickers machine gun
- 1× 0.303 in (7.7 mm) Lewis gun on Scarff ring in rear cockpit
- underwing bomb racks and under fuselage torpedo crutches, max load 690 lb (313 kg)
