= Handley Page Hare =

HP.34 Hare
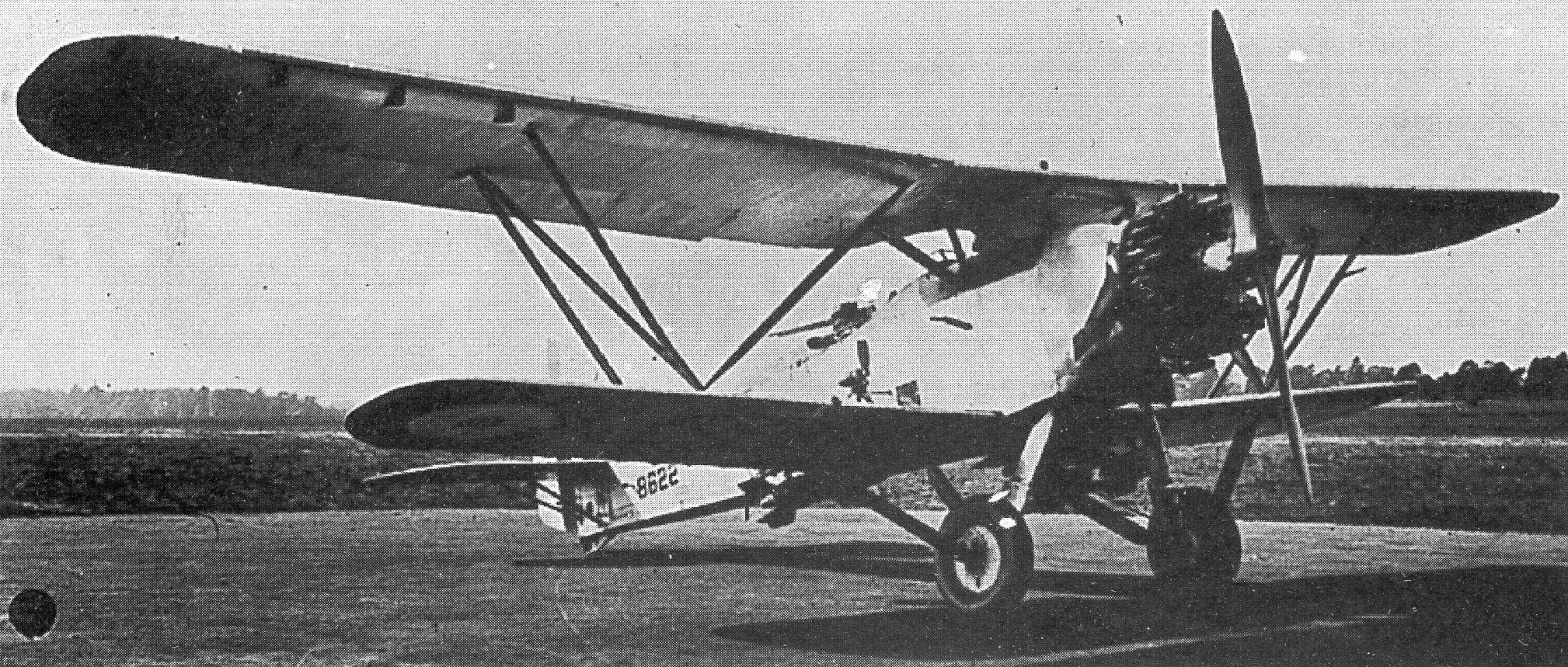

General information
- Type: Two-seat day bomber
- National origin: United Kingdom
- Manufacturer: Handley Page
- Number built: 1

History
- First flight: 1928
- Retired: 1937

The Handley Page HP.34 Hare was a British two-seat high-altitude day bomber designed and built at Cricklewood by Handley Page. It was designed by Harold Boultbee to meet the requirements of Air Ministry Specification 23/25 for a replacement for the Hawker Horsley in the day bomber role, competing against the Blackburn Beagle, Hawker Harrier, Gloster Goring and Westland Witch. The Hare was a conventional biplane, with single-bay unequal-span staggered wings, of mixed wood and metal construction (although the specification required that any production aircraft be of all-metal construction). It had a crew of two with the pilot in an open cockpit aft of the wing with a gunner/bomb aimer behind him.

Only one aircraft was built, with the serial J8622. It was first flown on 24 February 1928, powered by a Gnome-Rhône Jupiter as the planned Jupiter VIII was unavailable. Testing showed that the aircraft had poor handling and was prone to vibration, and it was modified with a 2 ft (0.61 m) longer fuselage and a revised tail, which improved handling. It was decided to modify the aircraft so that it could meet the requirements of Specification 24/25 to replace the Horsley in its other role as a shore-based torpedo bomber.

The Hare was unsuccessful in meeting both competitions, with the day bomber competition being abandoned in favour of purchasing the more advanced Hawker Hart built to Specification 12/36, while the torpedo bomber requirement was met by the Vickers Vildebeest. It remained in use with the Royal Air Force as a trials aircraft until 1932. It was then sold for a proposed long-distance flight by J.N. Addinsell and registered G-ACEL. The Hare was flown to London Air Park, Hanworth in 1933 where it was redoped and painted in civilian colours. It never flew again and was scrapped in 1937.

== Specifications ==
Data from Handley Page Aircraft since 1907

General characteristics

- Crew: two
- Length: 32 ft 2 in (9.81 m)
- Wingspan: 50 ft 0 in (15.24 m)
- Wing area: 454 sq ft (42.2 m^{2})
- Empty weight: 3,050 lb (1,383 kg)
- Gross weight: 7,243 lb (3,285 kg)
- Powerplant: 1 × Bristol Jupiter VIII , 485 hp (362 kW)

Performance

- Maximum speed: 152 mph (243 km/h, 132 kn)
- Range: 1,000 mi (1,609 km, 870 nmi)
- Service ceiling: 20,000 ft (6,098 m)

Armament

- Fixed forward firing machine gun
- Movable machine gun at rear cockpit
- Bombs or 2,000 lb (907 kg) torpedo

== See also ==
Related lists

- List of aircraft of the Royal Air Force
