= Bristol Hydra =

1930s British piston aircraft engine

Hydra
- Type: Piston aircraft engine
- Manufacturer: Bristol Aeroplane Company
- First run: 1931
- Major applications: Hawker Harrier (test bed only)
- Number built: 2

The Bristol Hydra (also known as the Double Octagon) was an experimental 16-cylinder, twin-row radial aircraft engine built by the Bristol Engine Company. It is a relatively rare example of a radial with an even number of cylinders per row – it is often claimed that radial engines require an odd number of cylinders, but this is simply easier, not physically required. Only two Hydras were built, the type never entered production.

== Design and development ==
It appears the Hydra was built as a "backup" design in case the newer sleeve valve engines being designed by Roy Fedden at the same time proved unworkable. Design of the Hydra was led by Frank Owner, who built an experimental V-4 design to test a new twin overhead cam design, a first for Bristol engines which normally used pushrods and rockers. When the V-4 ran successfully, it seems they used four such engines connected to a common crankcase to produce the Hydra.

The cams were operated by rotating shafts leading from the crankshaft at the back of the engine to the top of each cylinder row. The shaft was directly geared to one of the two camshafts, using another driven shaft to transmit power to the second camshaft on the "other side" of the cylinder heads. The arrangement was somewhat complex, but no more so than a pushrod-based system. A side-effect of the use of the overhead cams was that the cylinders were "in-line", whereas radials typically rotated the second bank of cylinders in relation to the first in order to expose them more fully to the airflow for cooling. Despite this, the engine is not generally considered with the inline radial engines, such as the Armstrong Siddeley Deerhound, as the cylinders are individual and not monoblocs.

The Hydra had only two valves per cylinder instead of three or four, limiting volumetric efficiency. It is generally difficult to properly arrange pushrods for four-valve operation in a multi-row radial engine, some of the rods would have to exit the crankcase between the cylinders where there is little room or spare strength. This difficulty was one of the reasons that led to Fedden's work on the sleeve valve. This is not so much of a problem on an in-line design, and is one of the reasons in-lines of the era were able to compete in performance terms with the generally much simpler radials. The use of the overhead cams on the Hydra avoided this problem as well, so given the possibility of using four valves on the Hydra, it seems odd this was not attempted.

Only two Hydras were built. One was test flown on the Hawker Harrier, and suffered severe vibration at critical speeds. In the end, Fedden was able to develop the sleeve valve into a superb series of engines, and the Hydra is almost forgotten.

== Applications ==
- Hawker Harrier

== Specifications (Hydra) ==
Data from Lumsden.

=== General characteristics ===
- Type: 16-cylinder, twin-row, air-cooled radial engine.
- Bore: 5.0 in (127 mm)
- Stroke: 5.0 in (127 mm)
- Displacement: 1,570 cu in (25.7 L)
- Length: 57 in (1448 mm)
- Diameter: 46.5 in (1181 mm)
- Dry weight: 1,500 lb (680 kg)
- Designer: Frank Owner

=== Components ===
- Valvetrain: Double overhead camshaft
- Supercharger: Medium supercharged
- Fuel type: DTD 134 petrol
- Cooling system: Air-cooled
- Reduction gear: Epicyclic geared, reduction ratio 0.424:1, left hand tractor

=== Performance ===
- Power output: 850 hp at 3,000 rpm
- Compression ratio: 6:1
- Power-to-weight ratio: 0.56 hp/lb

== See also ==
Related lists

- List of aircraft engines
