= Maria Josep Colomer i Luque =

Spanish aviator (1913–2004)

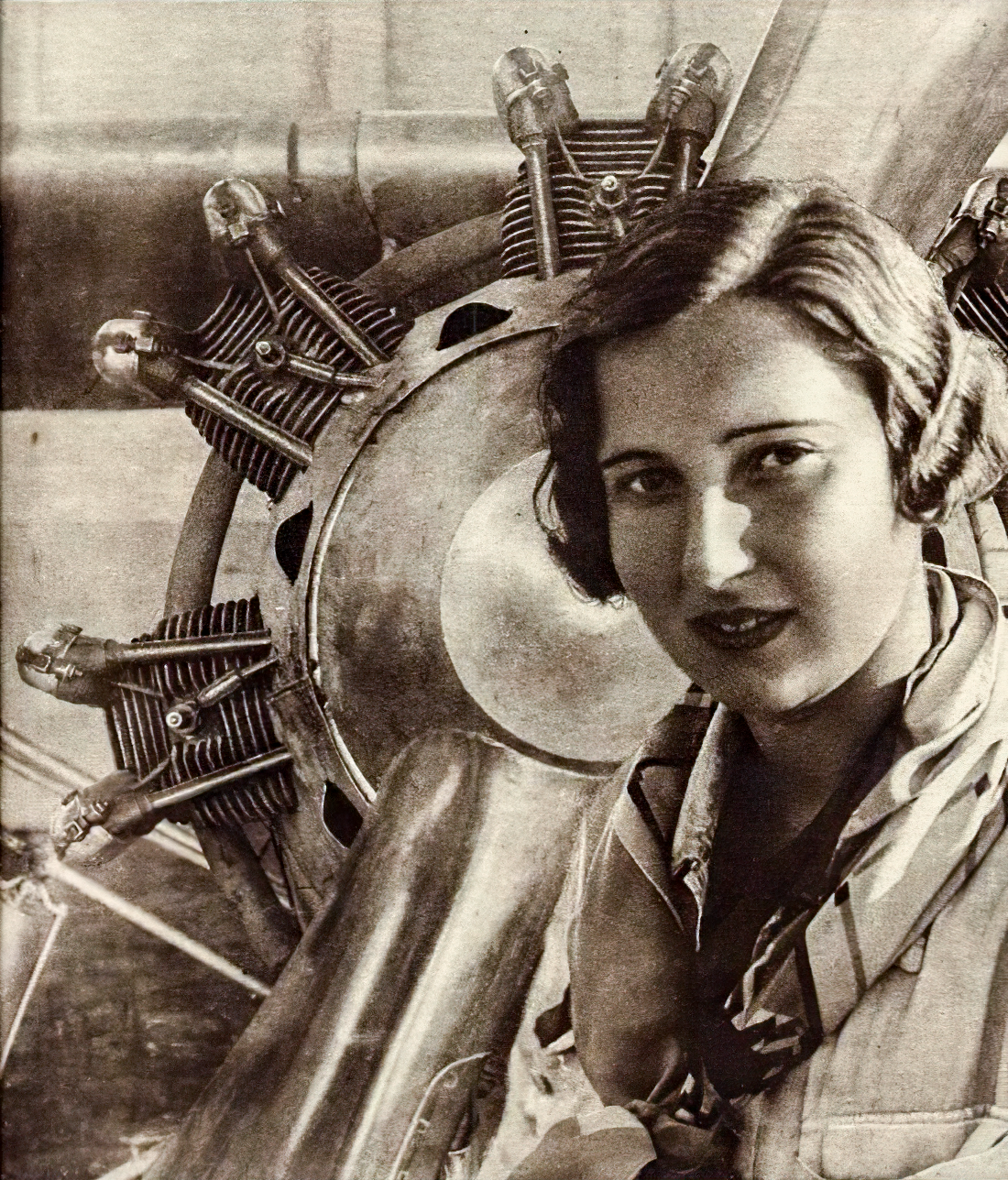
- Colomer in January 1931
- Born: 31 March 1913; Barcelona, Catalonia, Kingdom of Spain
- Died: 24 May 2004 (aged 91); Surrey, United Kingdom
- Known for: Aviator

Maria Josep Colomer i Luque (31 March 1913 – 24 May 2004), better known as Mari Pepa Colomer, was one of the pioneers of Spanish aviation. She was the first female flight instructor in Spain and the first Catalan woman (third Spanish woman) to earn a pilot's license.

She fought in the Spanish Civil War on the Republican side, and went into exile after the war, never flying again.

== Early life and education ==
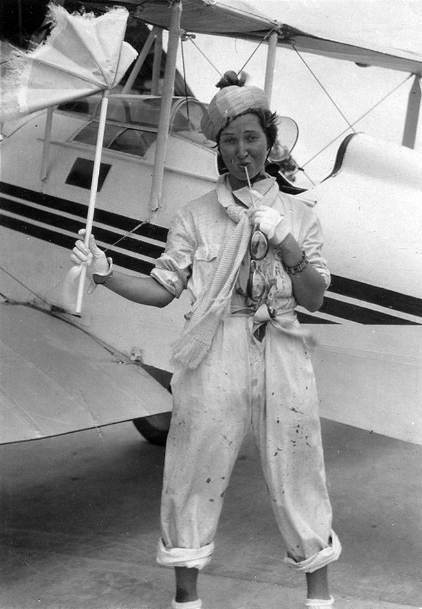
Colomer recreating her 'Mary Poppins' moment in the 1930s

Colomer grew up in a wealthy family in Barcelona. Her father was an artist from Sabadell, friends with Pablo Picasso, Salvador Dalí and contemporaries, while her mother was strict; Colomer was often taken to visit bars and meet artists by her father, who told her mother that they were out walking.

She was enrolled at the Institute for Culture and Popular Library of Women, an institution that was founded in 1909 by Francesca Bonnemaison with the intention of giving instruction to working women so that they could learn a trade and then practise their profession. Her parents wanted her to attend the cultural school, but her father was supportive when she asked to learn to fly; she had grown up admiring Amelia Earhart. Anecdotally, Colomer is reported to have first "flown" aged seven, when she jumped out of a second floor window from the back of her house on Calle Principe de Asturias while holding an umbrella "like Mary Poppins". She broke both legs in the incident.

Colomer and her father persuaded Josep Canudas, the rector of Barcelona Aviation School, to allow her to attend. In May 1930, she started studying there, becoming their first female student. Colomer would cycle to the Catalunya (El Prat) Aerodrome to test the planes being fixed up by mechanics. Such testing was part of a deal that helped her afford to continue flying lessons, and also happened so frequently that she quickly built up her flying hours. The flight lessons were otherwise funded by her father and some inheritance from the death of her maternal grandmother in October 1930. Her father told her mother that she was out at finishing school while she was learning to fly; her mother only learnt she had taken flying lessons when she was featured on the cover of La Vanguardia.

== Career ==
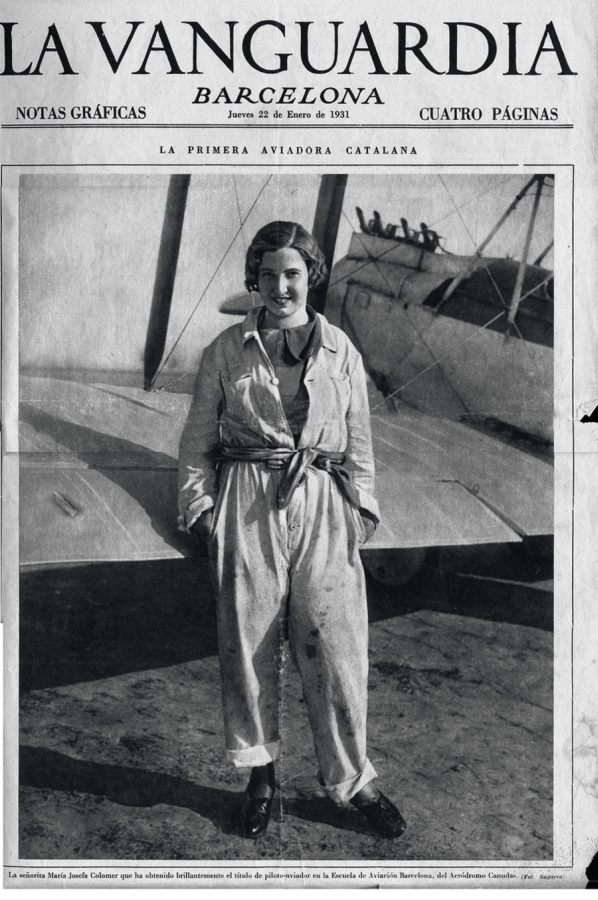
Colomer on the cover of La Vanguardia after obtaining her pilots' license in 1931

When she was 17, with the required 60 hours of flight experience, she gained her pilots' license on 19 January 1931. (Note: Though the source says she was 18, its given birth date and license date would make her 17, which other sources support.) She was frequently considered the first Spanish woman to obtain a pilots' license, although María Bernaldo de Quirós gained her pilots' license in 1928 in Madrid. Colomer was the third Spanish woman to earn a pilots' license, and the first Catalan woman to do so. Her achievement got her on the front cover of Catalonia's main newspaper, La Vanguardia, two days later and she was given a tribute by the Provincial Deputation of Barcelona.

After obtaining her license, to get professional experience and prove that she was at the same level as the rest of the all-male pilots at the time, she also undertook a commercial pilots' course, was employed in various flight jobs including transporting goods and dropping flyers, and took part in several amateur pilot competitions, including the Second Cardedeu Aviation Contest, which was, at the time, well-recognised in the world of civil aviation. She quickly became a popular figure, as in Spain at the time the ability to fly was a public spectacle, performing in many demonstrations; when the Second Spanish Republic was declared, she flew a plane with a banner in the colours of the new flag over Barcelona; one of her first passengers was Lluís Companys, the President of Catalonia; and in 1932 she landed a Zeppelin in Barcelona, a massive social event. One of her instructors, Josep Maria Carreras y Dexeus, was of equal celebrity, with the press often featuring his flights.

In July 1935, Colomer became the first female flight instructor in Spain. In 1936 she co-founded the first cooperative of Aerial Work of Catalonia, and the Catalan School of Aviation, where she also taught.

With the outbreak of the Spanish Civil War, she was enlisted to the Military Pilots' School of the Generalitat de Catalunya, with the rank of auxiliary first class in the Aeronautical Service, where she worked training new pilots for the Spanish Republican Air Force. She became an officer and took on various roles as an instructor, a supplies pilot, serving as an ambulance, dropping propaganda, evacuating civilians, testing aerial bombs, and performing aerial reconnaissance of the coast. There are no reports of Colomer flying combat. Colomer was a Republican, supporting the Spanish Republic and the autonomous Catalan government; her first mission was on 2 August 1936. Aged 23, she flew a plane dropping anti-fascist and pro-Catalan propaganda after an uprising. She personally trained 70 combat pilots, and sometimes flew to transport soldiers to the front line at the Aragon border, as well as returning wounded soldiers from the front. In the war she flew a de Havilland Dragon, the largest plane in the Catalan fleet.

After helping thousands of Republican soldiers to cross the Spanish-French border, she and her teacher Carreras exiled themselves at the end of the war, in 1939, when Franco's army occupied Catalonia, flying over the border to France. In 1984, she told El País that "All [pilots] left Spain by plane, of course. From the air we could see long lines of people walking toward France".

== Personal life ==
After their exile, Colomer and Carreras first lived in Toulouse, in the Occitan-speaking region of France. Colomer initially considered flying to Montevideo, Uruguay, where her father was exiled, but chose to stay with Carreras.

Carreras had once been an interpreter for Lord Beaverbrook, who invited them to England. The pair married and lived in Surrey. (Note: Sources conflict on whether the couple married in Spain, France, or England.) Carreras served again as a pilot, for the Royal Air Force, winning a medal for gallantry, and so was often away from home: when Colomer went into labour with their twins (a son and daughter) during an air raid she had to cycle herself to a hospital to give birth. Colomer briefly lived in Scotland, in a house provided by Beaverbrook, when she and the children were evacuated. In Scotland, she worked helping prisoners and those wounded in the war.

After World War II, she returned to Surrey, where she and Carreras worked with horses. Carreras was knighted for his services during the war.

She lived in England for the rest of her life, though she visited Spain several times. In late life, she said: "I will never move back to Spain, even though Franco is gone. I do not care. Almost all my friends have died and those who haven't live somewhere else in the world." She never piloted a plane again. When asked why, her answer was always that in England there was no job for her as a pilot.

== Death ==
Colomer died in Surrey, in England, on 24 May 2004. Her ashes were taken to the cemetery of Reus, in Catalonia.

== Legacy ==
There are several avenues named after Colomer, in El Prat de Llobregat (Barcelona) and Getafe (Madrid); a street with her name in Castelldefels (Barcelona); and a school covering infant through secondary education named for her, also in El Prat de Llobregat.

In July 2018, the "Herstóricas: Historia, Mujeres y Género" ("Her-story: History, Women and Gender") association and the Comic Authors Collective created a cultural education project to make women's history more visible, creating a pack of cards, one of which depicts Colomer.

Miguel de Lucas wrote in 2015 that Colomer "led [a life] of legend and enjoyed an uncommon longevity. Yet a decade after [her death], [she remains] unknown to most Spaniards".

Iberia named one of their A320neo aircraft Pepa Colomer, part of a tradition of naming planes after pioneering Spanish women pilots, including María Bernaldo de Quirós and Bettina Kadner.
