= No. 273 Squadron RAF =

- Active: 30 July 1918 – 5 July 1919; 1 August 1939 – 30 April 1946
- Country: United Kingdom
- Branch: Royal Air Force
- Mottos: Toujours Prêt (Always Ready)

Insignia
- Squadron Badge: Black widow spider on background including Asian swastika
- Squadron Codes: MS (Mar 1944 - Mar 1946)

No. 273 Squadron RAF was a Royal Air Force squadron formed as reconnaissance unit in World War I, and re-formed in World War II in Ceylon (Sri Lanka) - initially as a torpedo bomber and reconnaissance unit. In mid 1944, the squadron was re-equipped with Spitfire Mk VIIIs and flew and fought out of airfields in India and Burma. Following the end of the war, the squadron was moved first to Siam (Thailand), and then later, French Indo-China (Vietnam). It was re-equipped with Spitfire Mk XIVs in November 1945.

The squadron was disbanded at the end of January 1946.

== History ==
=== Formation and World War I ===
No. 273 Squadron Royal Flying Corps was formed on 30 July 1918 and operated DH.4s, DH.9s and Sopwith Camels from Burgh Castle, Norfolk, on reconnaissance missions. It also operated from Covehithe airfield near the Suffolk coast, which was previously an RNAS night airfield. The squadron disbanded on 5 July 1919 at Great Yarmouth.

=== Reformation in World War II ===
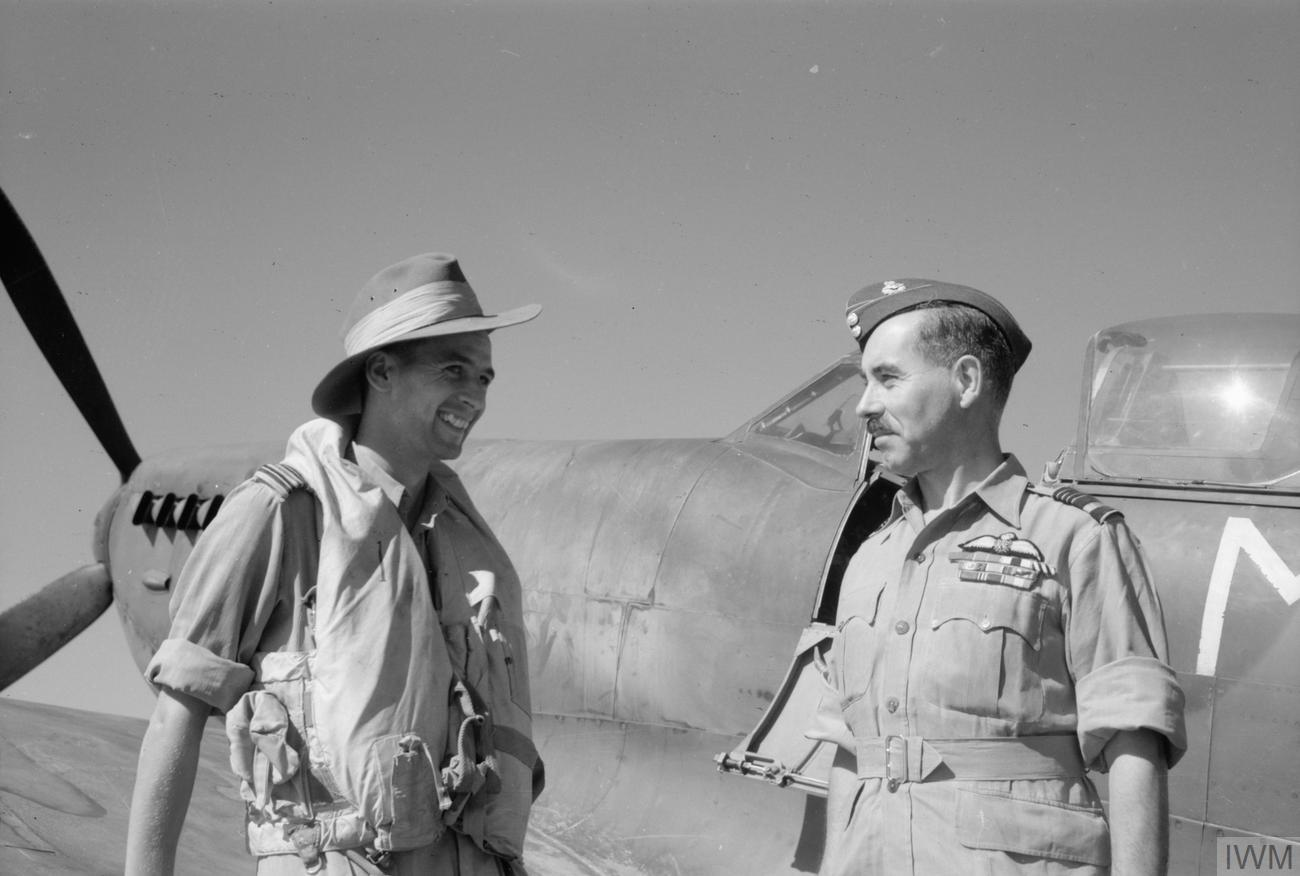
Squadron Leader Robert Hayes, Commanding Officer of No. 273 Squadron, chats with Air Marshal Sir Guy Garrod, the Allied Air Commander in Chief, Air Command South East Asia, by a Spitfire Mark VIII at Cox's Bazar, 1944

The squadron reformed on 1 August 1939 at China Bay in British Ceylon as a torpedo bomber squadron operating the Vickers Vildebeest. In March 1942, it was equipped with the Fairey Fulmars (as the only RAF unit) and lost an aircraft during the Japanese attack on Ceylon on 9 April, shooting down several bombers in return. It re-equipped with Hawker Hurricanes in August 1942 and then the Supermarine Spitfire Mk VIII in March 1944.

From March 1944, pilots were given the new Spitfire Mk VIII to fly, and the squadron was moved up to British India to join in the war against Japanese imperial forces. From May 1944 through to the end of the war, it was recorded that 14 pilots were killed.

From March to early July 1944, was the period in which the major Japanese attacks (Operation U-Go) against Imphal and Kohima were beaten back by Allied Indian and British forces, greatly assisted by the Third Tactical Air Force (TAF). The monsoon rains then followed, so that the next major round of strategic land battles commenced in late 1944 and early 1945. The Allied 14th Army pushed into Central Burma in January/February 1945, with their initial principal objectives being Meiktila and Mandalay. Mandalay fell towards the end of March 1945, and the next imperative was to capture Rangoon before the monsoon rains started in earnest.

Along the coast, 273 Squadron was part of No. 224 Group RAF (which in turn was part of the RAF Third Tactical Air Force). The RAF here was charged to support Commonwealth ground forces belonging to XV Corps, the role of which was to drive Japanese forces out of the coastal Arakan region. During July/August 1944, 273 Squadron flew out of Chittagong, and then mainly operated out of Cox’s Bazar from September to December 1944. During January 1945, the squadron operated out of the more inland Maunghnama. There was constant fighting over this period, concentrating on ground support operations for the army, but also flying against Japanese Nakajima Ki-43 Oscars (based out of Akyab), and convoy patrols. At least one pilot was killed over this period.

Akyab was evacuated by the Japanese at the end of December 1944, and Ramree Island was then occupied by Allied forces in February 1945. From February through to early May, 273 Squadron was based at Ramree Island, where it supported army operations as they moved against Japanese forces further south down the coast. Again, this was a period of intense fighting, when at least a further three other pilots were killed.

Rangoon was liberated by early May, and 273 Squadron moved into its new base at Mingaladon (just outside Rangoon) in the middle of that month. There was then a six-week period of somewhat frustrating operations, taken up mainly with patrolling. The first three weeks of July, however, involved a further final period of intense fighting. Allied army units and the RAF decimated Japanese forces as they attempted to cross the Sittang River and head back towards Thailand. At least three other pilots were killed during these final operations.

In mid-September, 273 Squadron was transferred to Don Muang, Siam (Thailand), and then moved to Tan Son Nhut, French Indo-China (Vietnam) at the end of that month. The squadron was re-equipped with Spitfire Mk XIVs in November 1945, used them in their only offensive operation on 11 December against Viet Minh in support of a surrounded French unit at Ban Me Thout and then finally disbanded (at Tan Son Nhut) at the end of January 1946.

== Badge design ==
A squadron badge was submitted to the Air Ministry in November 1944. The design included an ancient Asian swastika or fylfot and a black widow spider, together with the motto Toujours prêt. It was still awaiting final approval after several resubmissions when it had been rejected by Air Command South-East Asia and by the Inspector of RAF Badges. The squadron was disbanded before being issued a badge. A campaign in 1996 to have the badge issued for the veterans of No. 273 Squadron was unsuccessful despite the backing of several MPs, and it was finally awarded to the squadron association in principle. The badge is seen in the RAF Chapel at St Clement Danes, London.

== Aircraft operated ==
Aircraft operated by No. 273 Squadron RAF.
From	To	Aircraft	Variant
Aug 1918	Mar 1919	Airco DH.4	
Aug 1918	Mar 1919	Airco DH.9	
Aug 1918	Mar 1919	Sopwith Camel	
Aug 1939	Mar 1942	Vickers Vildebeest	III
Mar 1942	Sep 1942	Fairey Fulmar	II
Aug 1942	Nov 1942	Hawker Hurricane	I
Aug 1942	Dec 1943	Hawker Hurricane	IIB
Dec 1943	May 1944	Hawker Hurricane	IIC
Mar 1944	Dec 1945	Supermarine Spitfire	VIII
Nov 1945	Jan 1946	Supermarine Spitfire	XIV

A Tachikawa Ki-54 was briefly pressed into service by the squadron in September and October 1945, due to a lack of suitable fuel for the unit's Spitfires.
