= Bettina Kadner =

Spanish aviator

- Born: Bettina Inés Kadner Schilling; 1946 (age 79–80); Madrid, Spain
- Occupation: Aviator
- Employers: Spantax; Iberia
- Known for: First European woman airline pilot

Bettina Inés Kadner Schilling (born 1946) is a Spanish aviator. In 1969, at age 22, she became the first woman to pilot a passenger plane in Europe. She also became the first female pilot in command in Spain in 1998, and the second in Europe. She flew for Iberia from 1985 until her retirement in 2006.

== Early life and education ==
Bettina Kadner was born to a German family in Madrid in 1946. Though her grandfather worked as an architect, he had been a pilot during World War I. Her parents left Germany and settled in Madrid after World War II. Her mother, artist Ute Kadner, had a metal furniture factory and imported a runway signaling machine for airports. Bettina was 12 when she began to accompany her in her work, fell in love with the planes, and decided to be a pilot.

She began her education in the early 1960s. At 18, after finishing her Baccalaureate, she studied at the aviation schools of Cuatro Vientos and Alcantarilla, and took exams at the National Aeronautics School in Salamanca. After more than five years of study, in October 1969, she earned the title of first class commercial pilot, achieving the amendment of regulations that prevented women from flying commercial airplanes.

== Career ==
For a decade, Kadner was the only woman in a Spanish civil aviation cockpit. Her incorporation into the workforce was not easy, and on several occasions she heard colleagues on the radio saying, "Bettina, to the kitchen".

She also faced difficulties in gaining employment. She initially applied to Iberia, but was told it would be impossible for her to work there. After several months of trying, she looked for a job at Spantax, one of the first Spanish airlines to include women on its staff, which admitted her immediately. Among her first flight routes was Madrid – Las Palmas – Madrid in a Fokker. She was also a copilot in Douglas DC-6, DC-7, and DC-9 models, and became pilot in command of an F27 and a Boeing 737.

In 1985, Kadner was finally hired by Iberia, where she started as a second officer. She was promoted to pilot in command of the Airbus A320 model in 1998, aboard which she made mainly European flights. Her last professional flight was in November 2006.

== Achievements ==
Bettina Kadner became the first female pilot in command in Spain, and the second in Europe. She would be followed by a new generation of pilots such as María Aburto, Marta Pérez Aranda, and Rosa García Santolaya.

In 2019, she was presented with a doctora honoris causa degree by Rovira i Virgili University for her career and merits.

In 2021, Air Nostrum named one of their Bombardier CRJ-1000s in Kadner's honour, which flew with an all-female crew for its first scheduled flight.

In September 2025, Iberia named their aircraft EC-NFH the Bettina Kadner, part of a tradition of naming planes after pioneering Spanish women pilots, including Pepa Colomer, the first female Catalan pilot and María Bernaldo de Quirós.
