= Westland Witch =

Unsuccessful British bomber prototype

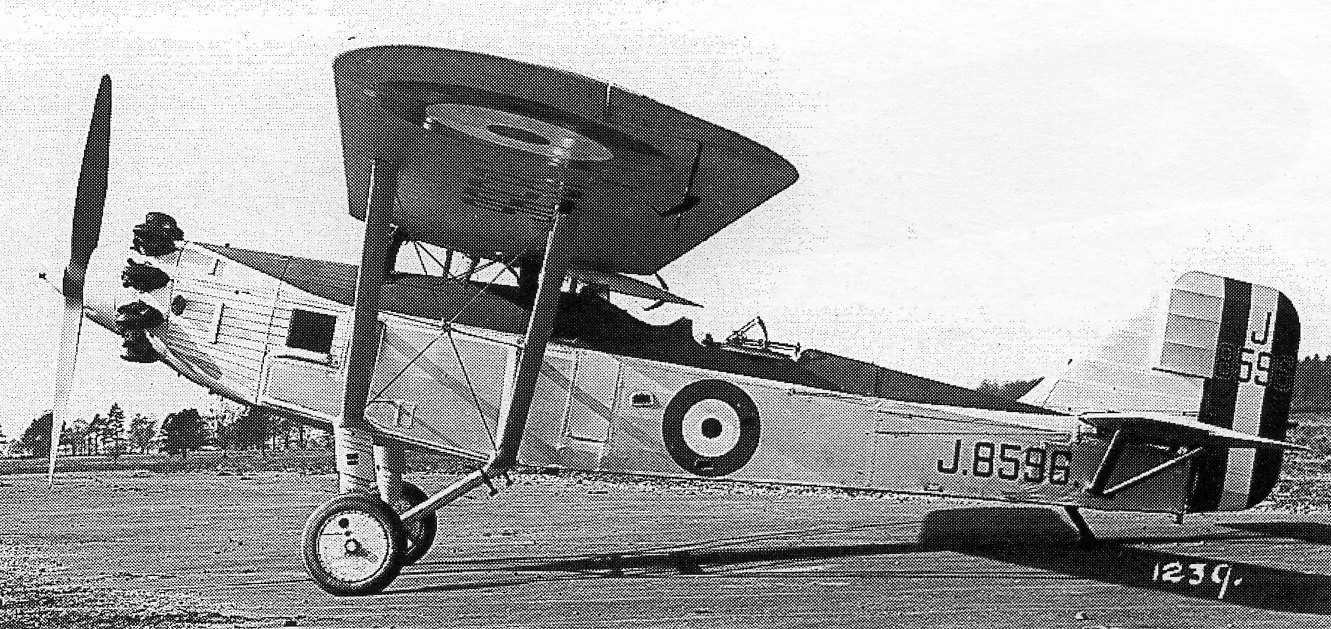

General information
- Type: Bomber
- National origin: United Kingdom
- Manufacturer: Westland Aircraft
- Designer: Arthur Davenport
- Primary user: Royal Air Force
- Number built: 1

History
- First flight: 30 January 1928
- Retired: 1931

The Westland Witch was an unsuccessful British bomber prototype, first flown in 1928. Only a single aircraft of this type was built.

== Development ==
The Witch was developed to specification 23/25 for a single-engined day bomber operating at high altitude. This specification initially requested the use of the Bristol Orion, a turbocharged version of the Bristol Jupiter, but other variants of the Jupiter were substituted after development of the Orion encountered difficulties. All aircraft submitted to 23/25 suffered from engine problems, and none of them were put into production.

The Witch employed a strut-braced parasol monoplane configuration. The wing was of wood and steel construction and spanned a generous 61 ft (19 m). The fuselage was built from duralumin and steel tubes, covered with fabric, with an uncowled Jupiter engine in the nose. The Witch had a crew of two, pilot and gunner/bombardier. The latter had a cockpit with a Lewis gun on a Scarff ring aft of the pilot, but could also employ this for a prone bomb-aiming position.

A bomb bay was incorporated in the fuselage in front of the pilot, with four doors which could be opened by the bombardier or would open under the weight of the dropped bombs. As specified in 23/25, a single 520 lb bomb could be carried, or a number of smaller weapons. The presence of a bomb bay in the fuselage required a complicated split-axle arrangement for the fixed undercarriage, which was braced to the fuselage and the wing struts. A cross-axle would have been in path of the falling bombs.

The prototype of the Witch, serial J8596, was first flown on 30 January 1928 at RAF Andover, with Louis Paget at the controls. The type was praised for its stability as a bombing platform, and its 138 mph maximum speed was good, although its 62 mph landing speed was felt to be too fast. However, the Witch was judged unsuitable for service due to structural weaknesses, including a number of failures of the landing gear struts and other components.

The same aircraft was nevertheless presented again the next year in Mk.II form, with a Jupiter VIIIF engine replacing the earlier Jupiter VI, and was used for testing of parachutes until 1931.

== Specifications (Witch Mk.I) ==
Data from F.K. Mason, The British Bomber since 1914, Putnam UK 1994

General characteristics

- Crew: 2
- Length: 37 ft 8 in (11.48 m)
- Wingspan: 61 ft 0 in (18.59 m)
- Height: 11 ft 6 in (3.51 m)
- Wing area: 534 sq ft (49.6 m^{2})
- Empty weight: 3,380 lb (1,533 kg)
- Gross weight: 6,050 lb (2,744 kg)
- Powerplant: 1 × Bristol Jupiter VI 9-cylinder air-cooled radial piston engine, 420 hp (310 kW)
- Propellers: 2-bladed fixed-pitch propeller

Performance

- Maximum speed: 138 mph (222 km/h, 120 kn) at 6,500 ft (2,000 m)
- Service ceiling: 19,000 ft (5,800 m)
- Time to altitude: 6,500 ft (2,000 m) in 14 minutes 12 seconds

Armament

- Guns: one fixed .303 Vickers operated by the pilot; one .303 Lewis in the rear cockpit
- Bombs: up to 520lb internally

== See also ==
Aircraft of comparable role, configuration, and era

- Blackburn Beagle
- Gloster Goring
- Handley Page Hare
- Hawker Harrier
