= Blackburn Beagle =

British single-engine, two-seat biplane bomber/torpedo aircraft

Beagle
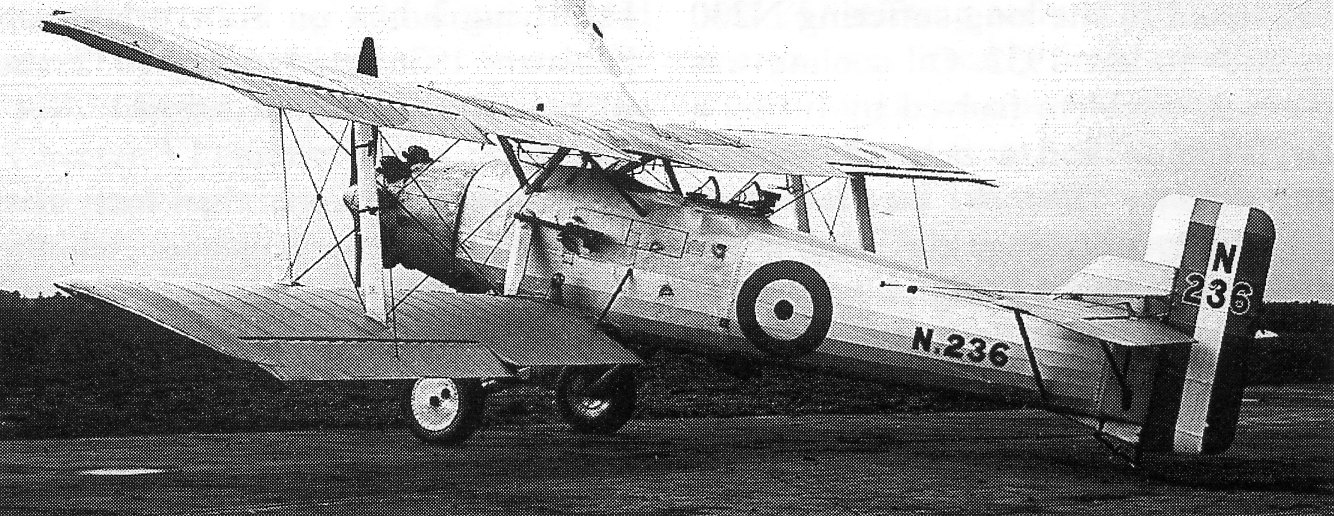

General information
- Type: bomber and torpedo bomber
- National origin: United Kingdom
- Manufacturer: Blackburn Aeroplane and Motor Co. Ltd
- Designer: G.E. Petty
- Number built: 1

History
- First flight: 18 February 1928
- Retired: 1933

The Blackburn B.T.1 Beagle was a British single-engine, two-seat biplane bomber/torpedo aircraft from 1928. Designed to Air Ministry specifications which led to no contracts for any manufacturer, only one Beagle was built.

== Development ==
The B.T. in the Beagle's designation stood for bomber and torpedo, the first aircraft that Blackburn had built for both roles. Its design was started to Air Ministry specification 24/25 for a high-altitude bomber, but was later modified to meet specification 23/25 for a day bomber, reconnaissance and torpedo aircraft.

The Beagle was a single-bay biplane with staggered and slightly swept wings. The fabric-covered wings, which did not fold as the aircraft was not intended for carrier service, had spruce spars and ribs with metal bracing. Four ailerons were fitted. The fuselage followed standard Blackburn practice with a steel tube centre section and wooden construction aft, though the final section was again of tube steel; covering was fabric throughout. Fin area was small and the rudder large, with a horn balance initially merging into the fin but later reduced, leaving a prominent step similar to that of the Blackburn Nautilus. The braced tailplane had significantly greater elevator than stabiliser area, the former also having prominent horn balances.

The undercarriage was of the split type required by the torpedo dropping role, but a carrier mechanism between the legs could also hold a 185 imp gal (840 L) fuel tank for reconnaissance work. Cockpits were open with the pilot in front, armed with a forward-firing .303 in (7.7 mm) Vickers machine gun mounted on the port side. The gunner's cockpit was close to the pilot's for communication. He had a Scarff ring-mounted .303 in (7.7 mm) Lewis Gun, but to fulfil his role as torpedo or bomb aimer, he moved into a prone position in a station below the pilot's cockpit. This had a bombsight, used via an opening with a sliding door in the bottom of the fuselage and had bomb fusing and release controls plus altitude and airspeed gauges and a hand-operated rudder control for yaw corrections on target.

The Beagle was initially powered by a 460 hp (340 kW) Bristol Jupiter VIIIF radial engine mounted in a smooth and rather pointed nosecone, leaving the tops of the nine cylinders exposed. After the competitive trials it was re-engined with a supercharged 590 hp (440 kW) Jupiter XF, though the extra power seems not to have led to significant performance improvement. This installation had a more pointed cowling, with more cylinder heads exposed for better cooling.

The Beagle flew first at Brough Aerodrome on 18 February 1928 piloted by W.S. Bulman. The rudder modification mentioned above was made before the aircraft went to competitive trial.

== Operational history ==
Trials took place at RAF Martlesham Heath in July 1929, where the Beagle was ranged against the Gloster Goring, the Handley Page Hare, the Hawker Harrier and the Westland Witch. None of these aircraft met the performance requirements, but as it had received favourable handling reports, the Beagle, along with the Vickers Vildebeest and Hare, was chosen for further testing. It was re-engined and returned to Martlesham in March 1931. By this time, however, the Vildebeest had already been chosen to meet the RAFs requirements for a torpedo bomber. The Beagle remained operational until October 1933.

== Specifications (bomber) ==
Data from Jackson 1968, p. 249

General characteristics

- Crew: two
- Length: 33 ft 1 in (10.08 m)
- Wingspan: 45 ft 6 in (13.86 m)
- Height: 11 ft 9 in (3.58 m)
- Wing area: 570 sq ft (53.0 m^{2})
- Empty weight: 3,495 lb (1,585 kg)
- Gross weight: 6,120 lb (2,776 kg)
- Powerplant: 1 × 9-cylinder radial Bristol Jupiter VIIIF , 460 hp (343 kW)

Performance

- Maximum speed: 140 mph (225 km/h, 120 kn) at 5,000 ft (1,525 m)
- Cruise speed: 115 mph (185 km/h, 100 kn)
- Endurance: 3 hours 30 minutes
- Service ceiling: 16,000 ft (4,880 m)
- Rate of climb: 740 ft/min (3.8 m/s) at 5,000 ft (1,525 m)

Armament

- 1 × fixed forward-firing 0.303 in (7.7 mm) Vickers machine gun
- 1 × ring-mounted 0.303 in (7.7 mm) Lewis gun in rear cockpit
