= Potez 35 =

French twin engine bomber aircraft

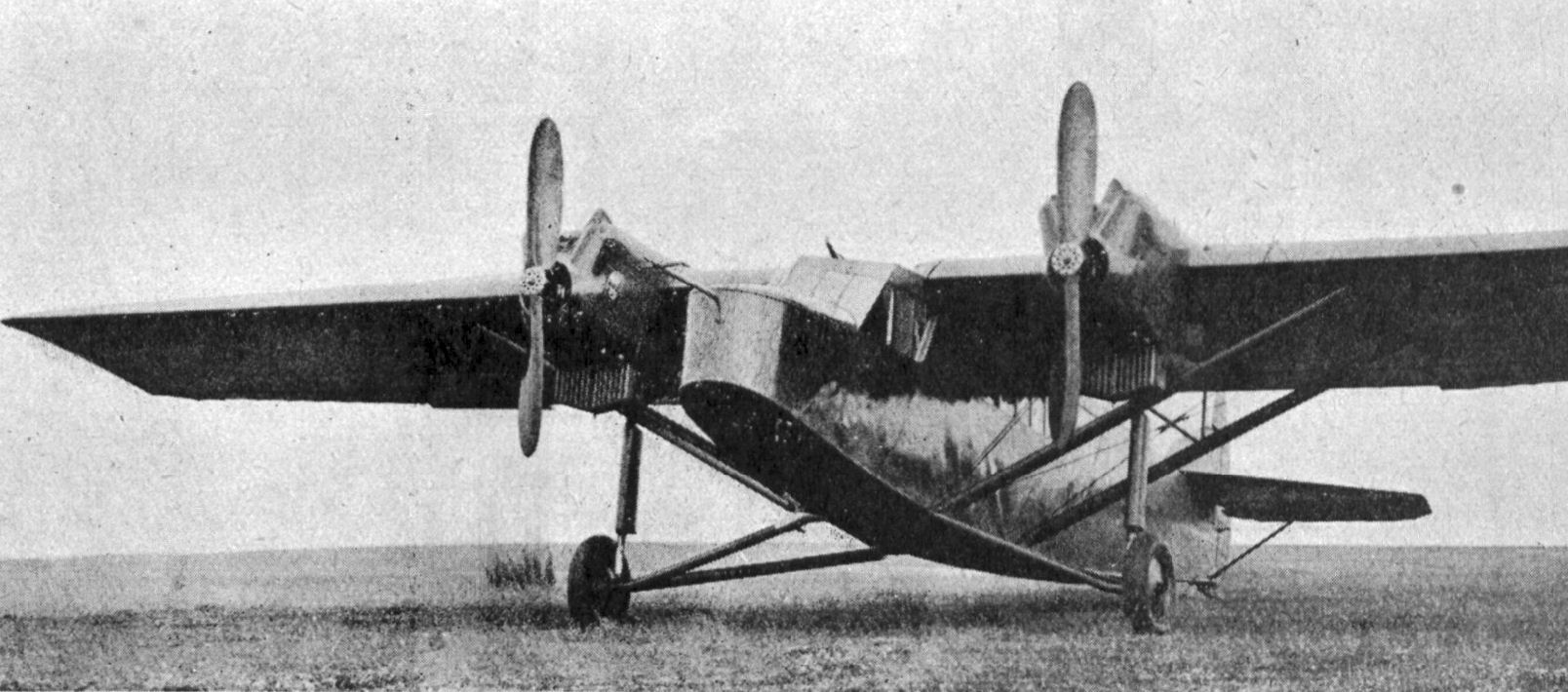

General information
- Type: Medium bomber and reconnaissance aircraft
- National origin: France
- Manufacturer: Henry Potez
- Number built: 1

History
- First flight: c.1928

The Potez 35 was a twin engine bomber aircraft, designed and built in France in the late 1920s. Only one was completed.

== Design and development ==
The Potez 35 was designed as a medium bomber and could be equipped for night as well as day attacks. The official classification was Multiplace (Grande Reconnaissance, Combat et Bombardment) (Multi-seat (Large Reconnaissance, Combat and Bombing)). It had a crew of two.

It was a twin engine, high wing monoplane of mixed construction. Its two spar wing was braced to the lower longerons of the rectangular section fuselage by parallel pairs of streamlined struts at about mid-span. Its liquid cooled V-12 Renault 12Jb engines were mounted on the wing, exhausting over the wing and with radiators attached to the lower front of their cowlings. Engine oil was carried and cooled in wing leading edge tanks. The tailplane was placed just above the fuselage and braced to it from below. The leading edge of the fin was curved and low; the balanced rudder projected above it and curved downwards to mid-fuselage, below the balanced elevators.

The Type 35 had a fixed conventional undercarriage. Each single main wheel was on a vertical, shock absorbing leg. which joined the forward spar through the engine mountings. The wheels were hinged to the lower longerons with pairs of long V-form struts. It had an enclosed pilot's cockpit ahead of the leading edge of the wing, equipped with a single fixed, forward firing machine gun. Behind the cockpit were cameras, radios and navigation equipment. The cabin could also house the bomb load, ten 50 kg (110 lb) bombs carried vertically. Further defensive armament was provided by a pair of ventrally mounted machine guns and by a pair of machine guns, on a standard gun ring, in an open dorsal position halfway between the trailing edge of the wing and the tail.

The Potez 35 was on display at the 1928 Paris Salon, equipped as a night bomber with searchlights in its nose. It made its first flight in that year but did not enter production.

== Specifications ==
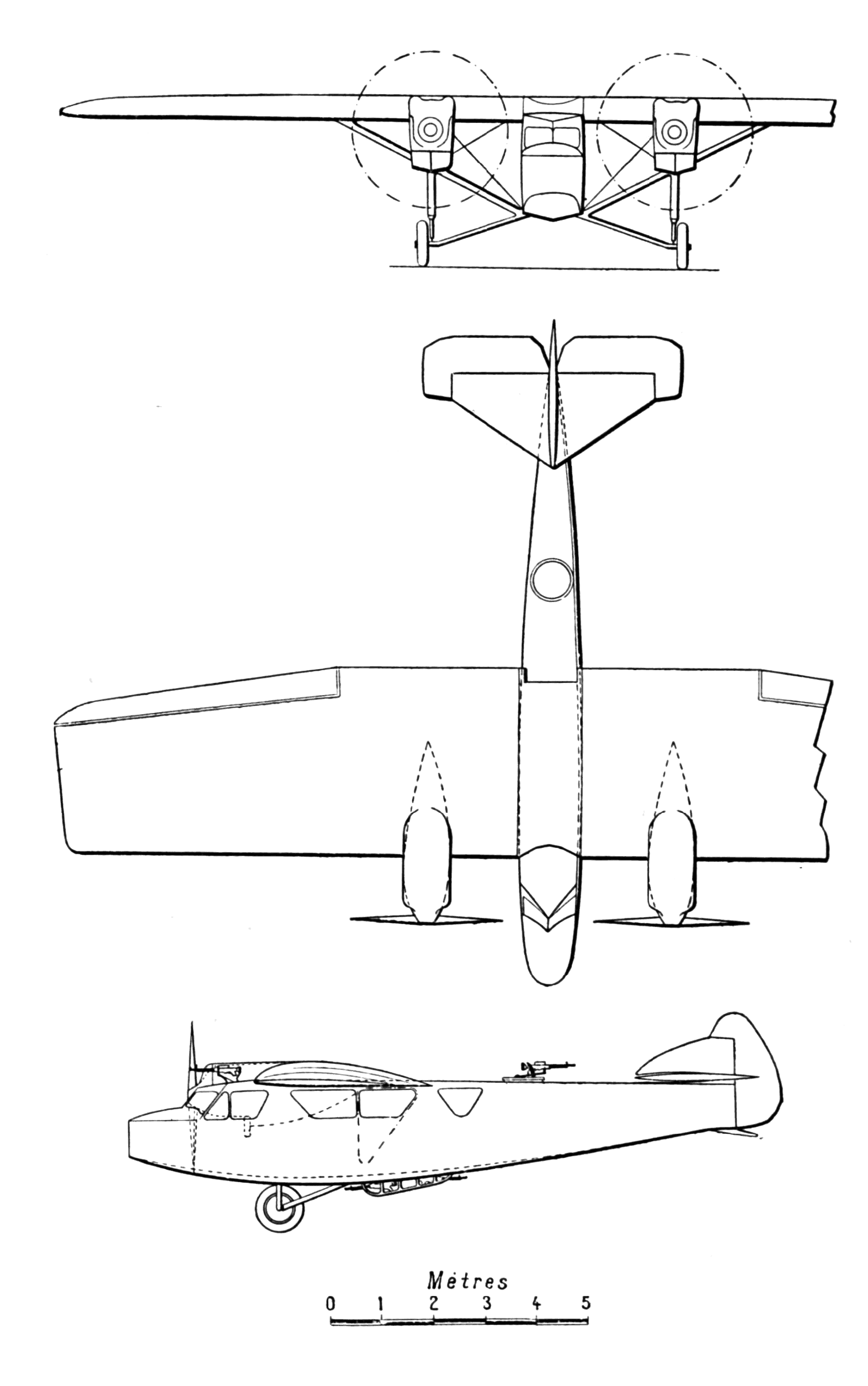
Potez 35 3-view drawing from L'Aéronautique June,1928

Data from Flight 19 July 1928

General characteristics

- Crew: Three
- Length: 12.8 m (42 ft 0 in)
- Wingspan: 19.2 m (63 ft 0 in)
- Wing area: 63 m^{2} (680 sq ft)
- Empty weight: 2,130 kg (4,696 lb) including engine coolant
- Gross weight: 3,450 kg (7,606 lb)
- Fuel capacity: 350 L (77 imp gal; 92 US gal) in wing tanks.
- Powerplant: 2 × Renault 12Jb liquid cooled V-12, 360 kW (480 hp) each
- Propellers: 2-bladed

Performance

- Maximum speed: 242 km/h (150 mph, 131 kn) at sea level
- Service ceiling: 7,000 m (23,000 ft)

Armament

- Guns: 5 × machine guns: 2 fixed in cockpit, 2 in dorsal and 2 in ventral positions.
- Bombs: 10 × 50 kg (110 lb).
