= Vickers Vildebeest =

Torpedo bomber in the Royal Air Force

Vildebeest / Vincent
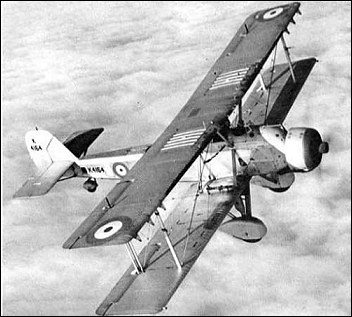
- Vickers Vildebeest

General information
- Type: Torpedo Bomber / Army Co-operation
- Manufacturer: Vickers
- Primary users: Royal Air Force Royal New Zealand Air Force; Spain
- Number built: 209 (Vildebeest); 197 (Vincent)

History
- Introduction date: 1933
- First flight: 1928
- Retired: 1942

The Vickers Vildebeest and the similar Vickers Vincent are single-engined British biplanes designed and built by Vickers and used as light bombers, torpedo bombers and in army cooperation roles. (Note: The official Afrikaans name was Wildebeest (today Wildebees), it was often written Vildebeeste, after a spelling mistake in official correspondence.) First flown in 1928, they remained in service at the start of the Second World War, with the last Vildebeests flying against Japanese forces over Singapore and Java in 1942.

== Design and development ==
=== Vildebeest ===
Designed against Air Ministry Specification 24/25 for the Royal Air Force (RAF), for a land-based torpedo bomber to replace the Hawker Horsley, the prototype Vildebeest, an all-metal fuselage aircraft with single-bay unstaggered fabric-covered wings and tail, was first flown in April 1928 as the Vickers Type 132, powered by a Bristol Jupiter VIII radial engine.

After initial evaluation, the Vildebeest was shortlisted for comparison with the Blackburn Beagle and Handley Page Hare. As the Jupiter VIII was prone to vibration, a second prototype, the Vickers Type 204 was fitted with an Armstrong Siddeley Panther IIA engine and after further testing, the Vickers design was confirmed as the winner of the contest but engine problems persisted until the type was tested with a new version of the Jupiter, which later became known as the Bristol Pegasus. An initial production order was placed in 1931 for nine aircraft, with the first production aircraft flying in September 1932.

Further production ensued, with an improved version fitted with a 635 hp (474 kW) Pegasus IIM3 entering service but after only 30 examples had been produced the Air Ministry requested a modification (Specification 15/34) which added a third crew position, thus creating the Vildebeest Mk III, of which 150 examples being built for the RAF.

The Mark IV introduced the much more powerful 825 hp (615 kW) Bristol Perseus sleeve valve radial engine enclosed in a NACA cowling which significantly improved performance, increasing maximum speed to 156 mph (251 km/h) and rate of climb to 840 ft/min (4.3 m/s). In this version, the Perseus had cooling problems and was deemed unsuitable for tropical service with production limited to 18 aircraft, all of which served with the home based squadrons.

=== Vincent ===
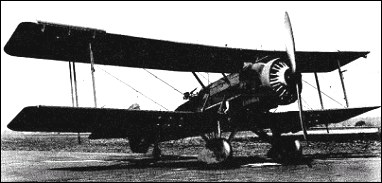
Vickers Vincent

In 1931, Vickers designed as a private venture a General Purpose version of the Vildebeest to replace the RAF's Westland Wapitis and Fairey IIIFs, supporting the Army in the Middle East. Successful trials were conducted in the Middle East, Sudan and East Africa with a converted Vildebeest I in the General Purpose role during 1932–1933, and Specification 16/34 was drawn up based on the three man Vildebeest, which was named the Vickers Vincent: differences from the Vildebeest were minimal (the first production Vincent was, converted from a Vildebeest MkII), principally removal of torpedo equipment, provision for an auxiliary fuel tank, message-pick-up and pyrotechnic signalling gear. Powered by a 660 hp (490 kW) Bristol Pegasus IIM3 the Vincent was unveiled to the general public for the first time at the 1935 RAF flying display at Hendon, but deliveries had already been made to No. 8 Squadron at Aden in late 1934. Between 1934 and 1936, 197 Vincents were built for or converted from Vildebeests for the RAF.

== Operational history ==
=== United Kingdom ===
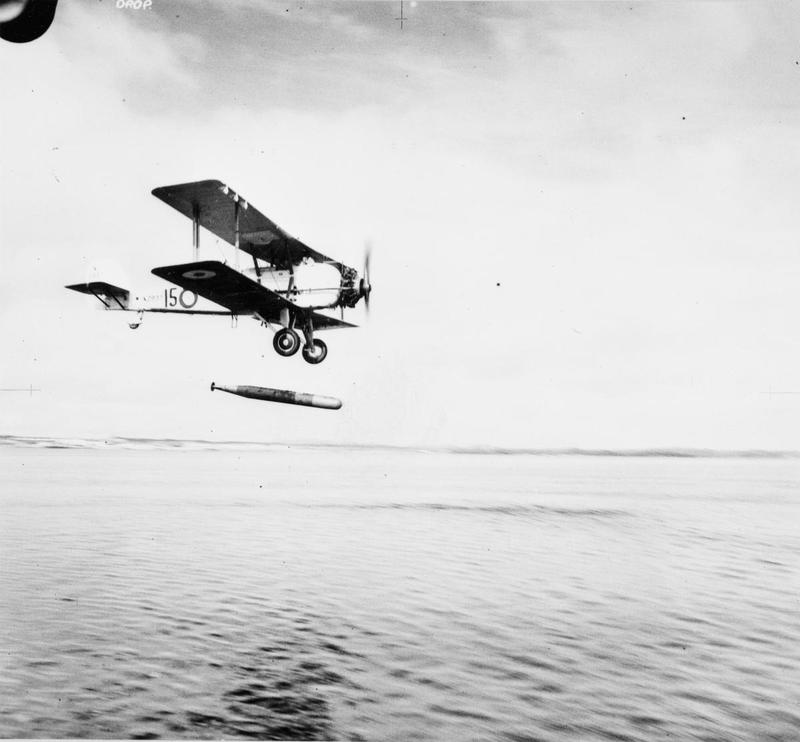
Vildebeest Mk II of No. 100 Squadron RAF making a torpedo drop during target practice, circa 1936.

The Vildebeest was purchased in moderately large numbers by the Royal Air Force from 1931 and used as a torpedo bomber. It entered service with No. 100 Squadron at RAF Donibristle in Scotland in October 1932, replacing the Hawker Horsley. Four frontline torpedo-bomber squadrons were equipped with the Vildebeest, two at Singapore (100 Squadron, which moved from the United Kingdom in 1933 and 36 Squadron, which replaced its Horsleys in 1935), and two more in the United Kingdom. The Vincent entered service with No. 84 Squadron RAF at Shaibah, Iraq in December 1934, re-equipping General Purpose squadrons throughout the Middle East and Africa. By 1937, it equipped six squadrons in Iraq, Aden, Kenya, Sudan, and Egypt. At the outbreak of the Second World War, 101 Vildebeests were still in service with the RAF. The two British-based squadrons flew coastal patrol and convoy escort missions until 1940 when their Vildebeests were replaced by the Bristol Beaufort.

The two Singapore-based squadrons were still waiting for their Beauforts when Japan invaded Malaya in December 1941 and the obsolete biplanes had to be deployed against the Japanese attackers, making an abortive torpedo attack on a Japanese cruiser off Kota Bharu on 8 December. The Vildebeests continued to attack the Japanese as their forces advanced down Malaya, sustaining heavy losses from Japanese fighters, particularly when no fighter cover could be provided. On 26 January 1942, the Japanese landed at Endau, 250 miles from Singapore, and 12 Vildebeests of 100 and 36 Squadrons were sent to attack the landings. Despite an escort of Brewster Buffalo and Hawker Hurricane fighters, five Vildebeests were lost. The attack was repeated later that day by eight Vildebeests of 36 Squadron and three Fairey Albacores, resulting in six more Vildebeests and two Albacores being shot down.

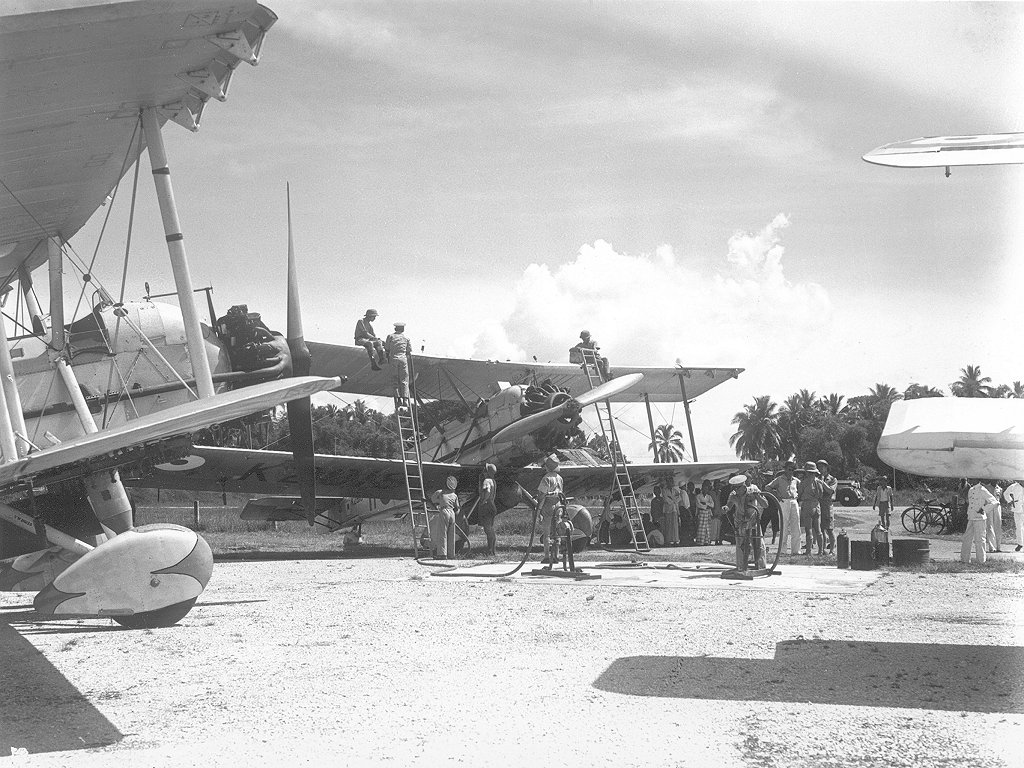
Vildebeest Mk.IIIs of 100 Squadron refuelling at Singapore, 1942.

The surviving Vildebeests were withdrawn to Java on 31 January and attacked another Japanese landing force off Rembang, claiming eight ships sunk but sustaining further losses. The final two Vildebeests of 36 Squadron attempted to escape to Burma on 6 March but were lost over Sumatra. The last Vildebeests in RAF service, operated by 273 Squadron at Ceylon were retired in March 1942.

While the Vincent had started to be replaced by more modern aircraft such as the Vickers Wellesley and Bristol Blenheim bombers, 84 remained in service with the RAF on the outbreak of the Second World War. Vincents were used for bombing missions against Italian forces in the East African Campaign and for coastal patrols from Aden, one attacking the Italian submarine Galileo Galilei. Other Vincents bombed Iraqi forces during the Anglo-Iraqi War of 1941. The last frontline Vincents retired in January 1943, with the type continuing in second line service (which included pesticide spraying against locusts in Iran) until 1944.

=== Spain ===
The Vildebeest was ordered by the Spanish Republic in 1932 and licence production of 25 Vildebeest for the Spanish Republican Navy was undertaken in Spain by CASA most receiving the Hispano-Suiza HS 600 inline engine, though some other engines were also used. Around 20 survived to fight with the Spanish Republican Air Force on the Republican side of the Spanish Civil War, some equipped with floats.

A Vildebeest was the first victim of Francoist ace Joaquin Garcia-Morato.

=== New Zealand ===
12 Vildebeests were purchased by the Royal New Zealand Air Force in 1935 for coastal defence, with a further 27 acquired from RAF stocks in 1940–41. In addition, 60 or 62 of these machines, (depending on source), were passed on to the RNZAF.

New Zealand Vildebeests were also used for photo mapping. A few were used for maritime patrols against German surface raiders, and Japanese submarines, (a handful were based in Fiji in December 1941), but the main wartime role of the New Zealand aircraft was as particularly unwieldy pilot trainers, until replaced by North American Harvards in 1942.

== Variants ==
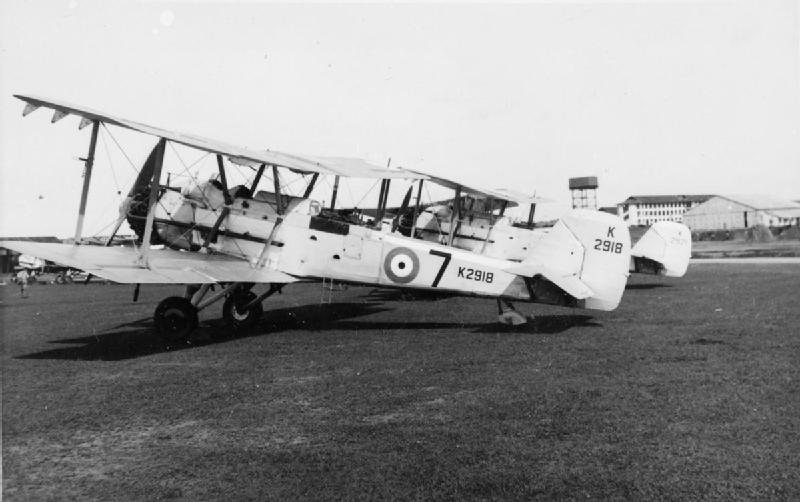
Vildebeest Mk II at RAF Seletar. January 1937

Type 132
Prototype built at Weybridge with a Jupiter VII engine.
Type 192
Prototype modified as a Series II with a Jupiter XF engine.
Type 194
Prototype modified as a Series III with a Jupiter XIF engine.
Type 204
Second private venture prototype as Series IV later to Air Ministry
Type 209
Prototype modified as a Series V with a Jupiter XIF engine.
Type 214
Prototype modified as a Series VI with a Jupiter XFBM engine.
Type 216
Prototype Series VII modified with an Hispano-Suiza 12Lbr engine and flown with floats.
Type 217
Second prototype to have been modified to Series VII but not converted.
Vildebeest Mark I
Type 244 – Initial production version, a two-seat torpedo-bomber powered by a 600 hp (448 kW) Bristol Pegasus IM3 engine. 22 built for the RAF between 1932 and 1933.
Vildebeest Mark II
Type 258 – Variant with more powerful (635 hp (474 kW)) Pegasus IIM3 engine. 30 built for RAF and delivered 1933.
Vildebeest Mark III
Type 267 – Three seat torpedo-bomber. 150 built for RAF, delivered 1935–36. 15 ex-RAF aircraft (including one converted Mark II) diverted to RNZAF later.
Type 277 – Twelve aircraft with folding wings and the ability to carry drop tanks for RNZAF delivered in 1935.
Vildebeest Mark IV
Type 286 – Two seat version powered by 825 hp (615 kW) Bristol Perseus engine. Eighteen built for RAF, 12 of which were sold to New Zealand.
Type 245 Vildebeest
Series IX, Torpedo bomber for Spanish Navy, powered by 600 hp (448 kW) Hispano-Suiza 12L water cooled V-12 engine. First prototype Vildebeest modified to this standard and flew in this form in June 1930, with 26 licence built in addition to the prototype.
Type 263
One Vildebest I modified with a Pegasus 1M3 engine.
Vincent
Type 266 – Three-seat General Purpose version for RAF. Pegasus IIIM3 engine. 197 built new or converted.

== Operators ==
Iraq

- Royal Iraqi Air Force – six Vickers Vincents donated in 1940. Due to their poor condition, only five were ever operated.
  - No. 2 Squadron RIrAF

New Zealand

- Royal New Zealand Air Force
  - No. 1 Squadron RNZAF
  - No. 2 Squadron RNZAF
  - No. 3 Squadron RNZAF
  - No. 4 Squadron RNZAF
  - No. 5 Squadron RNZAF
  - No. 6 Squadron RNZAF
  - No. 7 Squadron RNZAF
  - No. 8 Squadron RNZAF
  - No. 22 Squadron RNZAF
  - No. 30 Squadron RNZAF
  - No. 42 Squadron RNZAF

Spanish Republic

- Spanish Republican Navy

United Kingdom

- Royal Air Force
  - No. 5 Squadron RAF – Vincent
  - No. 7 Squadron RAF – Vildebeests used for trials
  - No. 8 Squadron RAF – Vincent
  - No. 22 Squadron RAF – Vildebeest
  - No. 27 Squadron RAF – Vincent
  - No. 28 Squadron RAF – Vincent
  - No. 31 Squadron RAF – Vincent
  - No. 36 Squadron RAF – Vildebeest
  - No. 42 Squadron RAF – Vildebeest
  - No. 45 Squadron RAF – Vincent
  - No. 47 Squadron RAF – Vincent
  - No. 55 Squadron RAF – Vincent
  - No. 84 Squadron RAF – Vincent. Vildebeests used for tropical trials
  - No. 100 Squadron RAF – Vildebeest
  - No. 207 Squadron RAF – Vincent
  - No. 223 Squadron RAF – Vincent
  - No. 244 Squadron RAF – Vincent
  - No. 273 Squadron RAF – Vildebeest
  - No. 1430 Flight RAF

== Surviving aircraft ==
A Vildebeest/Vincent composite airframe is being restored by the Air Force Museum of New Zealand at Wigram Aerodrome in Christchurch, from the substantially complete remains of Vildebeest Mark III NZ102, incorporating parts from Vildebeest NZ105 and Vincents NZ355 and 357. A Vincent (NZ311) has nearly completed restoration to static display by the Subritzky family near Auckland, New Zealand. A Spanish Vildebeest is rumoured to have survived.

== Specifications (Vildebeest III) ==
Data from Vickers Aircraft since 1908.

General characteristics

- Crew: three, pilot, navigator, and observer
- Length: 36 ft 8 in (11.18 m)
- Wingspan: 49 ft 0 in (14.94 m)
- Height: 14 ft 8 in (4.47 m)
- Wing area: 728 sq ft (67.6 m^{2})
- Empty weight: 4,773 lb (2,165 kg)
- Gross weight: 8,500 lb (3,856 kg)
- Powerplant: 1 × Bristol Pegasus II-M3 nine-cylinder air-cooled radial engine, 635 hp (474 kW)

Performance

- Maximum speed: 143 mph (230 km/h, 124 kn)
- Range: 1,250 mi (2,010 km, 1,090 nmi) at 122 mph (106 kn; 196 km/h)
- Service ceiling: 19,000 ft (5,800 m) (absolute ceiling)
- Rate of climb: 630 ft/min (3.2 m/s) 7.5 min to 5,000 ft (1,500 m)

Armament

- Guns: 1 × fixed, forward-firing .303 in (7.7 mm) Vickers machine gun and 1 × flexible, rearward-firing .303 in (7.7 mm) Lewis Gun
- Bombs: 1,100 lb (500 kg) of bombs or 1 × 18 in (457 mm) torpedo

== See also ==
Aircraft of comparable role, configuration, and era

- Blackburn Baffin
- Fairey Gordon
- Fairey III

Related lists

- List of aircraft of the Royal Air Force
- List of aircraft of the Spanish Republican Air Force
- List of aircraft of World War II

== Bibliography ==
- Andrews, C. F. and E. B. Morgan. Vickers Aircraft since 1908. London: Putnam, 1988. ISBN 0-85177-815-1.
- Arraez Cerda, Juan (January 1995). "Les Vickers Vildebeest espagnols (1^{ère} partie)" [The Spanish Vickers Vildebeests]. Avions: Toute l'aéronautique et son histoire (in French) (23): 20–27. ISSN 1243-8650.
- Jarrett, Philip. "By Day and By Night: Vildebeest and Vincent". Aeroplane Monthly Volume 23, No. 2, Issue 262, February 1995, pp. 16–22. ISSN 0143-7240.
- Jarret, Philip (March 1996). "Les Vickers Vildebeest et Vincent (1^{e} partie)" [The Vickers Vildebeest and Vincent]. Avions: Toute l'aéronautique et son histoire (in French) (36): 22–27. ISSN 1243-8650.
- Jarret, Philip (April 1996). "Les Vickers Vildebeest et Vincent (2^{e} partie)". Avions: Toute l'aéronautique et son histoire (in French) (37): 29–35. ISSN 1243-8650.
- Jarret, Philip (May 1996). "Les Vickers Vildebeest et Vincent (3ème partie)". Avions: Toute l'aéronautique et son histoire (in French) (38): 2–7. ISSN 1243-8650.
- Jarret, Philip (June 1996). "Les Vickers Vildebeest et Vincent (4ème partie)". Avions: Toute l'aéronautique et son histoire (in French) (39): 35–38. ISSN 1243-8650.
- Mason, Francis K. The British Bomber since 1914. London: Putnam Aeronautical Books, 1994. ISBN 0-85177-861-5.
- Mondey, David. Hamlyn Concise Guide to the British Aircraft of World War II. Chancellor, 1982. ISBN 1851526684
- "No. 100 Squadron". Flight, 28 October 1955, pp. 673–676, 678.
- Richards, Denis and Hilary St. G. Saunders. Royal Air Force 1939–1945: Volume II The Fight Avails. London: Her Majesty's Stationery Office, 1954.
- Sipos, Milos; Cooper, Tom (2020). Wings of Iraq, Volume 1: The Iraqi Air Force, 1931-1970. Warwick, UK: Helion & Company Publishing. ISBN 978-1-913118-74-7.
- Thetford, Owen. "By Day and By Night: Vincents in Service". Aeroplane Monthly, Volume 23, No. 3, Issue 263, March 1995, pp. 18–22. ISSN 0143-7240.
- Thetford, Owen. "By Day and By Night: Vildebeests in Service". Aeroplane Monthly, Volume 23, No. 4, Issue 264, April 1995, pp. 36–42. ISSN 0143-7240.
