= María Bernaldo de Quirós =

Spanish aviator

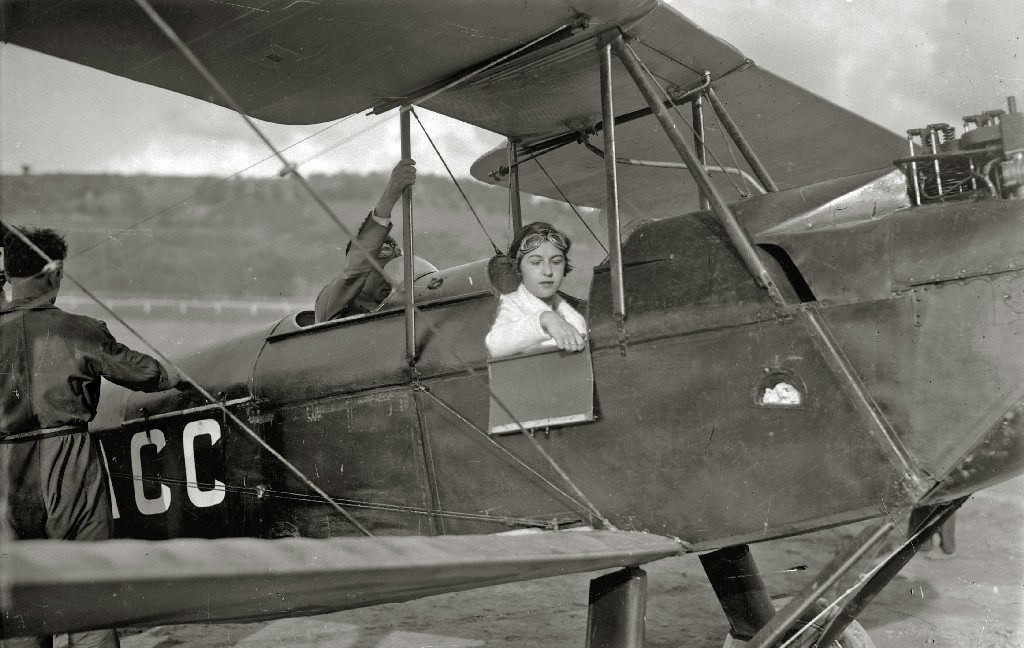
- María Bernaldo de Quirós in 1928
- Born: 26 March 1898; Madrid
- Died: 26 September 1983 (aged 85)
- Occupation: aviator
- Spouses: Ramón Bernaldo de Quirós y Argüelles , José Manuel Sánchez-Arjona y Velasco

María Salud Bernaldo de Quirós (26 March 1898 – 26 September 1983) was the first woman in Spain to earn a pilot's licence, passing her test in early October 1928 and receiving the licence from the Escuela Nacional Aeronáutica (National Aeronautical School) on the following 24 November. The first Spanish male pilot, Benito Loygorri, had made his first flight in Spain seven years earlier.

== Early life ==
Born on 26 March 1898 in Madrid, Bernaldo de Quirós was the daughter of aristocrats Rafael Bernaldo de Quirós y Mier and Consolación Bustillo y Mendoza. She married twice, first to her cousin Ramón Bernaldo de Quirós y Argüelles who died in 1920. The couple had two children but both died, one shortly after her husband. In 1922, Bernaldo de Quirós married José Manuel Sánchez-Arjona y Velasco who became mayor of Ciudad Rodrigo in the Province of Salamanca, but the marriage was short lived.

== Flying career ==
Although Bernaldo had dreamt of flying as a child, it was not until her second marriage that she began training under flying instructor José Rodríguez y Díaz de Lecea in a de Havilland DH.60 Moth. Bernaldo received her licence from the Real Aeroclub de España at the Getafe aerodrome south of Madrid. She took part in various demonstrations and flying exhibitions in northern Spain, including those in Vitoria, San Sebastián, Oviedo, Gijón and Vigo. She also flew over the car of the Infante Jaime, Duke of Segovia when he arrived in A Coruña in 1929, throwing flowers out as he passed below. The same year, as a result of public acclaim, she received the military aviation insignia from the Royal Aero Club, a rare distinction. A relationship developed with her flying instructor Díaz de Lecea, lead to a secret divorce with her husband in 1929. She was one of the first women to take advantage of the Ley del Divorcio de la Segunda República (Divorce Law of the Second Republic).

She emphasised how she had become a "modern woman" in several interviews published in the press. On one occasion she remarked, "As public opinion evolves, people will realize that women can do more than just embroider".

As a result of the Spanish Civil War and its outcome, little is known of Bernaldo's subsequent life. She continued to be the companion of Días de Lecea until he died in 1967.

== Death and legacy ==
Bernaldo died on 26 September 1983. A street in Ciudad Rodrigo bears her name.

Iberia, the Spanish flag carrier airline, has named an aircraft after her, an Airbus A320 NEO, registration EC-NJU, part of a tradition of naming planes after pioneering Spanish women pilots, including Pepa Colomer and Bettina Kadner.
