= Peyret-Abrial A-5 Rapace =

Single-seat French glider, 1928

General information
- Type: Glider
- Manufacturer: Georges Abrial
- Designer: G. Abrial, Louis Peyret and Professor Toussaint

History
- First flight: 1928

The Peyret-Abrial A-5 Rapace, also called the Abrial A-5 Rapace, was a glider designed by Georges Abrial in France during the 1920s, assisted by Louis Peyret and Professor Toussaint. The aircraft flew for the first time in 1928.

== Design and development ==
The A-5 Rapace was constructed primarily of wood, with high set monoplane wings.

== Specifications (A-5 Rapace) ==
Data from

General characteristics

- Crew: 1
- Length: 5 m (16 ft 5 in)
- Wingspan: 16 m (52 ft 6 in)
- Wing area: 16 m^{2} (170 sq ft)
- Aspect ratio: 16
- Gross weight: 190 kg (419 lb)

Performance

- Maximum glide ratio: 25:1
