= G.A.C. 102 Aristocrat =

Aristocrat
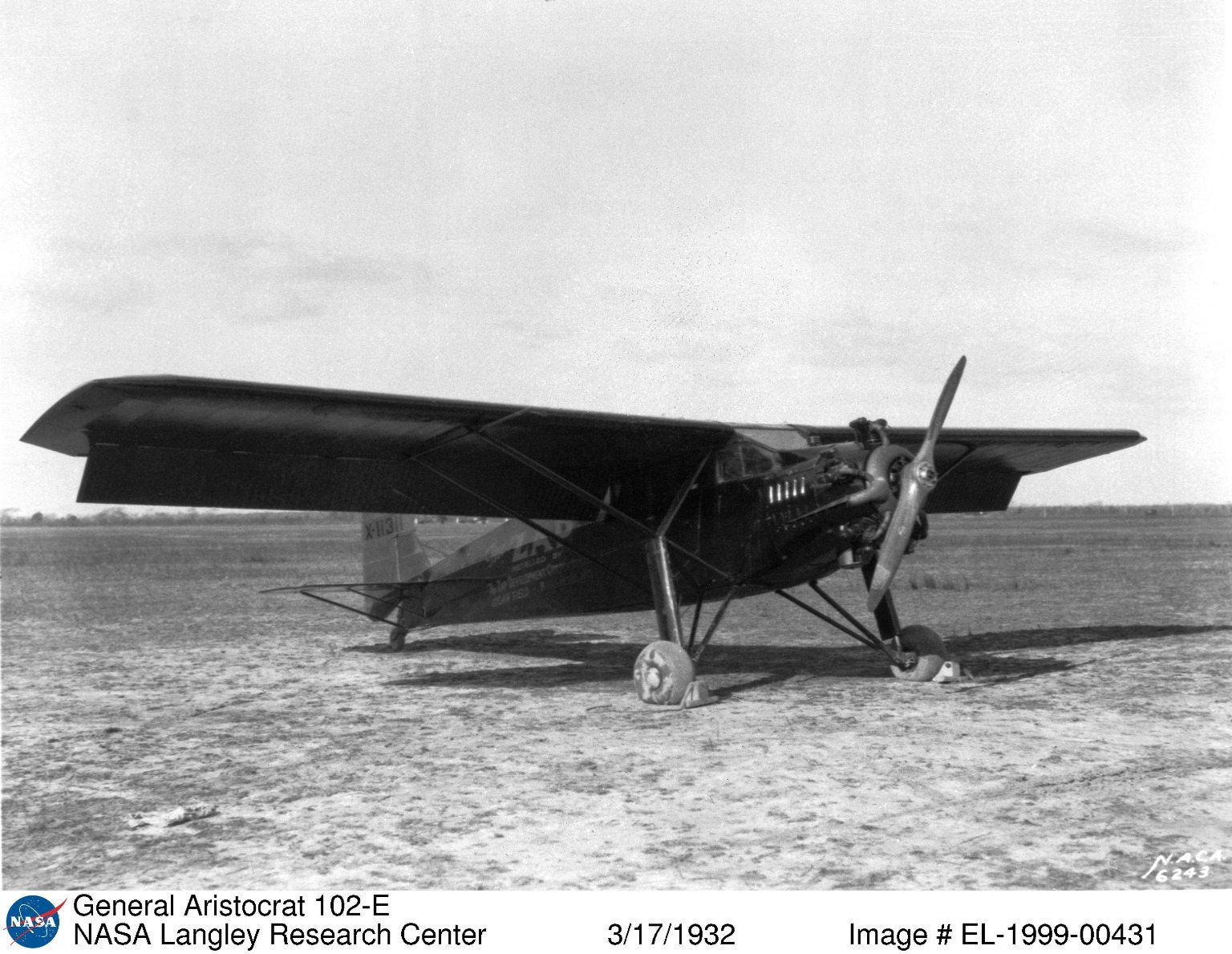

General information
- Type: Three seat touring aircraft
- National origin: US
- Manufacturer: General Airplanes Corp. (G.A.C)
- Designer: Francis Archer
- Status: One survivor
- Number built: c.45

History
- First flight: late July 1928

The G.A.C. 102 Aristocrat or General 102 Aristocrat is a single-engined cabin monoplane built in the US just before the Great Depression. It proved popular, with over forty built; an early example was taken on an aerial survey of Antarctica. One survives.

== Design and development ==
The Aristocrat is a high, braced wing monoplane with a two-part wing of rectangular plan apart from clipped tips, mounted to the fuselage without dihedral. The wing structure is entirely wooden and built around spruce box-spars and girder ribs. Apart from the leading edge, which is reinforced with aluminium sheet, the surfaces are fabric covered. Parallel pairs of steel bracing struts run between the lower fuselage and the spars at about mid-span.

The majority of Aristocrats were powered by 110 hp (82 kW) Warner Scarab seven-cylinder radial engines, though later variants had more powerful radials. Photographs show them uncowled.

Behind the engine, the lower fuselage of the Aristocrat is flat-sided and built from welded chrome-molybdenum steel tubes. Its enclosed cabin is largely under the wing though the pilot's windshield is ahead of the leading edge and close to the engine; behind the pilot, there are seats for two passengers, who enter by two large doors, and rear baggage space. Behind the wing leading edge, the upper fuselage surface is raised with a fairing.

The Aristocrat's empennage is steel framed and fabric covered. Its tailplane is mounted at the top of the fuselage and the horizontal tail is straight-tapered in plan out to rounded tips. The tailplane is in-flight adjustable and braced from below with a single strut on each side, carrying balanced elevators with a cut-out for rudder movement. The fin is small and almost triangular but the rudder, also balanced, is tall and blunt-topped.

The undercarriage is of the fixed, cantilever, tailwheel type and has a track of 2.10 m (83 in). Each faired undercarriage leg is a strongbox, formed from aluminium sheet and hinged on the lower fuselage longeron. Their tops are joined to a rubber spring shock absorber mounted centrally on the cabin frame below the pilot's seat. The wheels have brakes. The tailwheel's castoring is also restrained by rubber springs.

== Operational history ==
The first flight of Aristocrat was at the end of July 1928. Two more prototypes were built and the second prototype was one of four aircraft that accompanied Richard E. Byrd's aerial survey expedition to the Antarctic in late 1928-early 1929, although Byrd did not take it to Antarctica, instead leaving it behind at Dunedin, New Zealand. These were followed by thirty-one examples of the production type 102-A, all with the same 110 hp (82 kW) Scarab engine as on the prototypes.

Models 102-B to 102-D, with different engines were proposed but not built. Six examples of the 102-E, powered by a 175 hp (130 kW) Wright J-6-5 five-cylinder radial engine were completed in 1931-2. The large increase of power raised the Aristocrat's cruise speed up to 110 mph (180 km/h; 96 kn).

One 102-E was fitted experimentally with full-span Zap flaps and retractable Zap ailerons (spoilerons) by NACA in 1932-3. A photograph shows that this 102-E, at least, had a much-modified undercarriage with the wheels on simple V-struts and with vertical shock absorber legs to the forward wing spars.

The final Aristocrat variant was the 102-F, fitted with a 165 hp (123 kW) Continental A-70. There were six of these, one converted from a 102-E.

General Airplanes was liquidated in 1931.

Aristocrat N(C)278H, built in the 102-A batch, was restored in 1986 and given a 220 hp (160 kW) Continental radial. It remained airworthy until at least 2010. This aircraft is now displayed at the Western Antique Aeroplane & Automobile Museum in Hood River, Oregon.

== Variants ==
102
Scarab powered. Three prototypes, one taken to Antarctica by Byrd's expedition. Scarab engine.

102-A
Production mode, thirty-one built, Scarab engine.

102-B, -C, -D
Unbuilt, differently engined variant proposals.

102-E
Wright J-6-5 engine. Six built. One modified with Zap ailerons and flaps.

102-F
Continental engine. Six built, one a re-engined 102-E.

== Specifications (102 prototype) ==
Data from Les Ailes, October 1929 except where noted

General characteristics

- Crew: One
- Capacity: Two passengers
- Length: 26 ft 8 in (8.13 m)
- Wingspan: 36 ft 4 in (11.08 m)
- Height: 7 ft 7 in (2.31 m)
- Wing area: 190 sq ft (18 m^{2})
- Airfoil: Clark Y
- Empty weight: 1,248 lb (566 kg)
- Gross weight: 2,108 lb (956 kg)
- Powerplant: 1 × Warner Scarab 7-cylinder radial, 110 hp (82 kW)
- Propellers: 2-bladed

Performance

- Maximum speed: 110 mph (177 km/h, 96 kn) at ground level
- Cruise speed: 90 mph (140 km/h, 78 kn)
- Stall speed: 40 mph (65 km/h, 35 kn) minimum speed
- Range: 540 mi (870 km, 470 nmi)
- Service ceiling: 12,100 ft (3,700 m)
- Rate of climb: 650 ft/min (3.3 m/s)
