= Antoine Paillard =

Antoine Joseph Henri Louis Paillard
- Born: 23 August 1897
- Died: 15 June 1931 (aged 33)
- Military career
- Allegiance: France
- Branch: Flying service
- Rank: Sous lieutenant
- Unit: Escadrille BR132
- Awards: Legion d'honneur Médaille militaire Croix de Guerre

Born in Sainte-Gemmes-d'Andigné in 1897, sous Lieutenant Antoine Joseph Henri Louis Paillard was a World War I flying ace credited with five aerial victories and was awarded three decorations including the Legion of Honor.

== Biography ==
See also Aerial victory standards of World War I

Antoine Joseph Henri Louis Paillard was born in Sainte-Gemmes-d'Andigné on 23 August 1897.

Paillard served as a Breguet bomber pilot in Escadrille BR.132. On 1 May 1918, he shot down a German airplane for his first victory. Then, on 14 September 1918, Paillard was one of four French pilots combating four German Fokker D.VIIs, along with Jean-François Jannekeyn. The four French bomber aircrews managed to shoot down all four German fighters; all French participants were credited with four victories each. Paillard was awarded the Medaille Militaire for his valor, as well as the Croix de Guerre.

His daughter Gisele Paillard was born on 23 May 1920.
