= Hawker Harrier =

Experimental biplane torpedo bomber aircraft built by Hawker Aircraft

Harrier
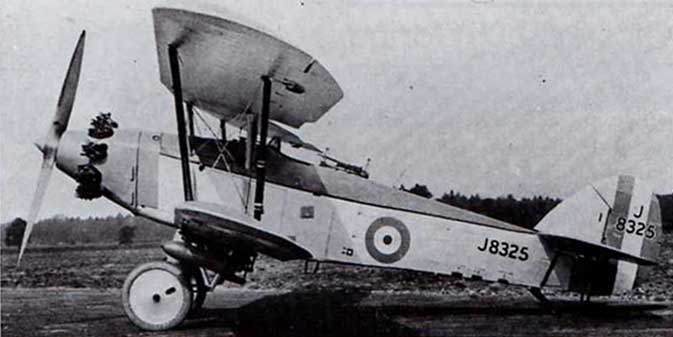
- Hawker Harrier prototype at A &AEE

General information
- Type: Torpedo bomber
- National origin: United Kingdom
- Manufacturer: Hawker Aircraft Limited
- Designer: Sydney Camm
- Number built: 1

History
- First flight: February 1927

The Hawker Harrier was a British experimental biplane torpedo bomber aircraft built by Hawker Aircraft to a specification issued in the 1920s for the Royal Air Force.

== Development ==
In 1925, the British Air Ministry laid down specifications for a high altitude bomber to replace the Hawker Horsley and for a coastal torpedo bomber (Specifications 23/25 and 24/25). As these specifications were similar, the Air Ministry announced that a single competition would be held to study aircraft submitted for both specifications.

Sydney Camm of Hawker Aircraft designed the Harrier to meet the requirements of Specification 23/25, with the prototype (J8325) first flying in February 1927, the first of the competitors for the two specifications to fly. The Harrier was a two-seat biplane with single-bay wings powered by a geared Bristol Jupiter VIII radial engine. It was armed with one .303 in (7.7 mm) Vickers machine gun and one .303 in (7.7 mm) Lewis gun carrying a maximum of 1,000 lb (450 kg) of bombs.

The prototype Harrier was tested at the Aeroplane and Armament Experimental Establishment (A & AEE) at Martlesham Heath in November 1927, where, while it met the requirements of Specification 23/25 and had satisfactory handling, the geared engine meant that it was underpowered, and it had an inferior bombload to the Hawker Horsley, the aircraft it was meant to replace. It was therefore modified to carry a torpedo. On testing the modified aircraft, however, it was found to still be underpowered, being incapable of taking off with a torpedo, gunner and full fuel load. It was therefore not considered further, the competition ultimately being won by the Vickers Vildebeest.

The prototype was used by Bristol as an engine testbed, flying with the 870 hp (650 kW) Bristol Hydra and the 495 hp (369 kW) Bristol Orion engines.

== Specifications (Harrier, as bomber) ==
Data from Mason, The British Bomber since 1914

General characteristics

- Crew: two
- Length: 29 ft 7 in (9.02 m)
- Wingspan: 46 ft 3 in (14.10 m)
- Height: 13 ft 4 in (4.06 m)
- Wing area: 496.8 sq ft (46.15 m^{2})
- Empty weight: 3,278 lb (1,487 kg)
- Gross weight: 5,656 lb (2,566 kg)
- Fuel capacity: 191 imp gal (229 US gal; 870 L)
- Powerplant: 1 × Bristol Jupiter VIII nine-cylinder geared radial engine, 583 hp (435 kW)
- Propellers: 2-bladed Watts wooden propeller, 12 ft 3 in (3.73 m) diameter

Performance

- Maximum speed: 135 mph (217 km/h, 117 kn) at 6,500 ft (2,000 m)
- Service ceiling: 20,000 ft (6,100 m)
- Time to altitude: 18 min 30 s

Armament

- Guns: 1 × forward firing .303 in (7.7 mm) Vickers gun and 1 × .303 in (7.7 mm) Lewis gun on Scarff ring in rear cockpit
- Bombs:
  - 4× 250 lb (110 kg) GP bombs or
  - 8× 112 lb (51 kg) bombs or
  - 1× Type VIII 2,844 lb (1,290 kg) torpedo

== See also ==
Aircraft of comparable role, configuration, and era

- Blackburn Beagle
- Vickers Vildebeest
