= 1923 Air Union Farman Goliath crash =

The 1923 Air Union Farman Goliath crash may refer to either of two accidents to Farman F.60 Goliath aircraft operated by Air Union.

- May 1923 Air Union Farman Goliath crash, in which F-AEGB crashed at Monsures, Somme, France with the loss of all six on board
- August 1923 Air Union Farman Goliath crash, in which F-AECB crashed at East Malling, Kent, with one passenger being killed
