= Blériot 165 =

165
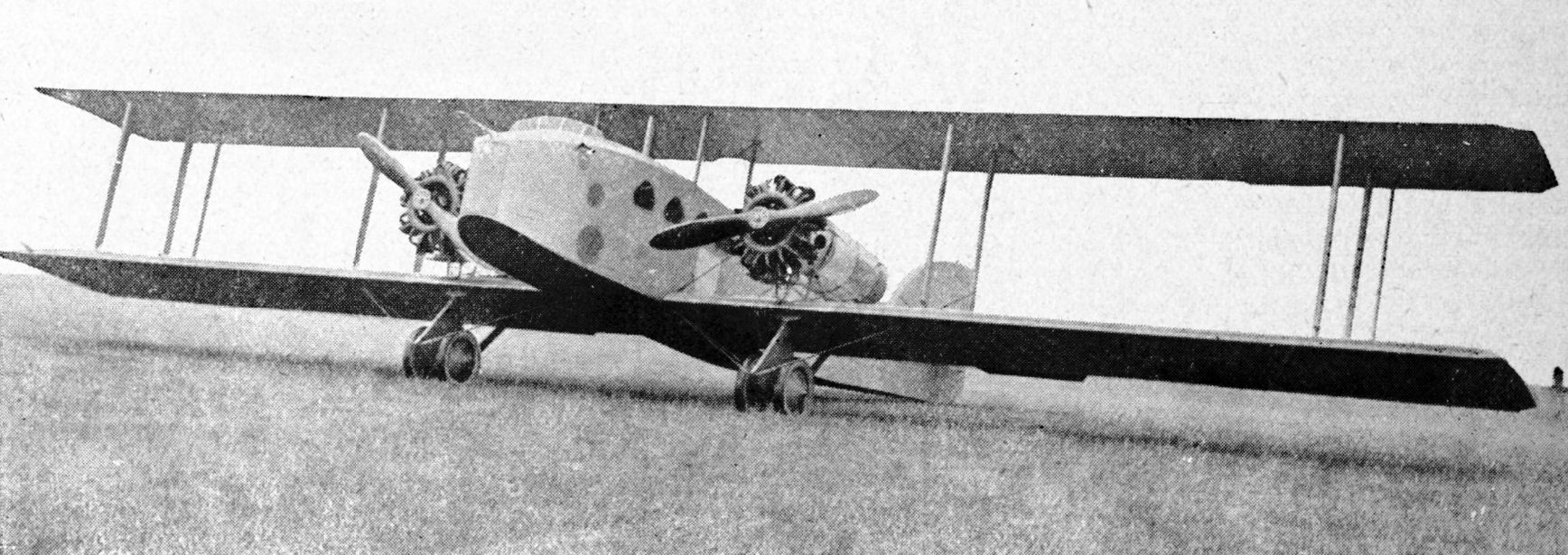

General information
- Type: Airliner
- Manufacturer: Blériot
- Primary user: Air Union
- Number built: 2

History
- First flight: 27 October 1926

The Blériot 165 (or Bl-165) was a French airliner of the 1920s. It was a twin-engined biplane, a final development in the family of designs that began with the Blériot 115. Two were built for Air Union to replace the Farman Goliath on their Paris–London route and were christened Leonardo da Vinci and Octave Chanute. The airline found that it preferred the Lioré et Olivier LeO 21s that it had ordered alongside this aircraft, meaning that no further examples were produced.

The second aircraft had originally been fitted with Renault 12Ja inline engines and night-flying equipment and had been designated Blériot 175, but it was soon refitted to the same standard as the first and shared its designation. At one point, plans were made to build a second 175 for Paul Codos to make a long-distance flight from Paris to Tokyo, but this did not eventuate. Similarly, plans to build a bomber version as the Blériot 123 were also abandoned.

== Variants ==
123
Projected three-seat bomber version. Not built.
165
Original design with 2x 310 kW (420 hp) Gnome & Rhône 9Ab engines.
175
Powered by 2x 340 kW (450 hp) Renault 12Ja, fitted with night-flying gear.

== Operators ==
France

- Air Union

== Specifications ==
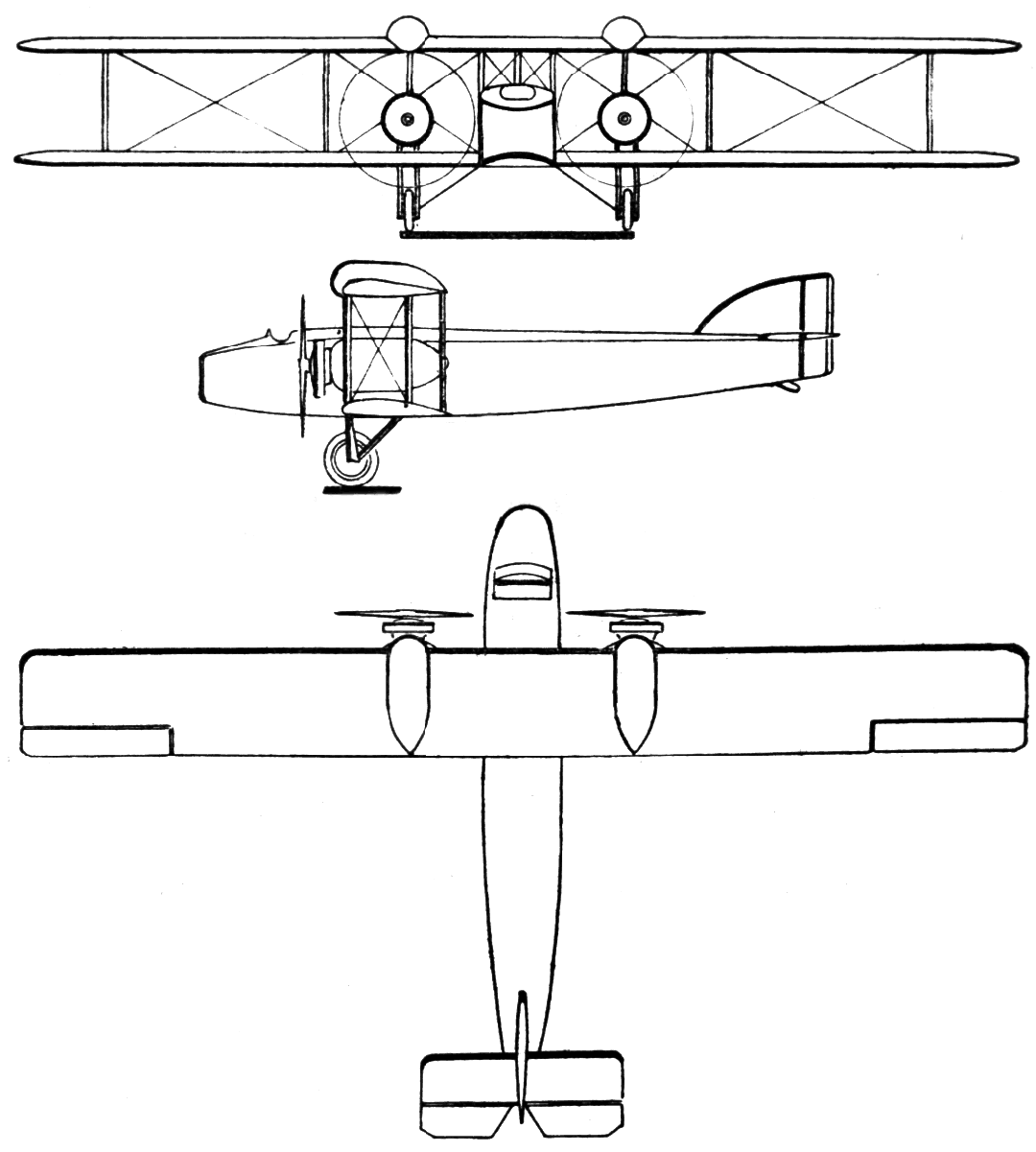
Blériot 165 3-view drawing from L'Aéronautique March 1928

Data from Jane's all the World's Aircraft 1928, Avafrance:Blériot Bl-165

General characteristics

- Crew: 2
- Capacity: 16
- Length: 15.15 m (49 ft 8 in)
- Wingspan: 23.2 m (76 ft 1 in)
- Height: 4.35 m (14 ft 3 in)
- Wing area: 119.1 m^{2} (1,282 sq ft)
- Empty weight: 3,100 kg (6,834 lb)
- Gross weight: 5,450 kg (12,015 lb)
- Fuel capacity: 750 kg (1,650 lb)
- Powerplant: 2 × Gnome & Rhône 9Ab 9-cylinder air-cooled radial piston engine, 310 kW (420 hp) each

Performance

- Maximum speed: 180 km/h (110 mph, 97 kn)
- Range: 525 km (326 mi, 283 nmi)
- Service ceiling: 4,000 m (13,000 ft)
- Rate of climb: 2.2 m/s (430 ft/min)
- Time to altitude: 2,000 m (6,600 ft) in 15 minutes
- Wing loading: 45.8 kg/m^{2} (9.4 lb/sq ft)
- Power/mass: 0.1157 kW/kg (0.0704 hp/lb)

== Bibliography ==
- Cortet, Pierre (July 2000). "L'avion de transport public Blériot 165" [The Commercial Transport Blériot 165]. Avions: Toute l'Aéronautique et son histoire (in French) (88): 11–14. ISSN 1243-8650.
- Cortet, Pierre (February 2000). "Rétros du Mois" [Retros of the Month]. Avions: Toute l'Aéronautique et son histoire (in French) (83): 5. ISSN 1243-8650.
