= Bréguet 26T =

French airliner

26T
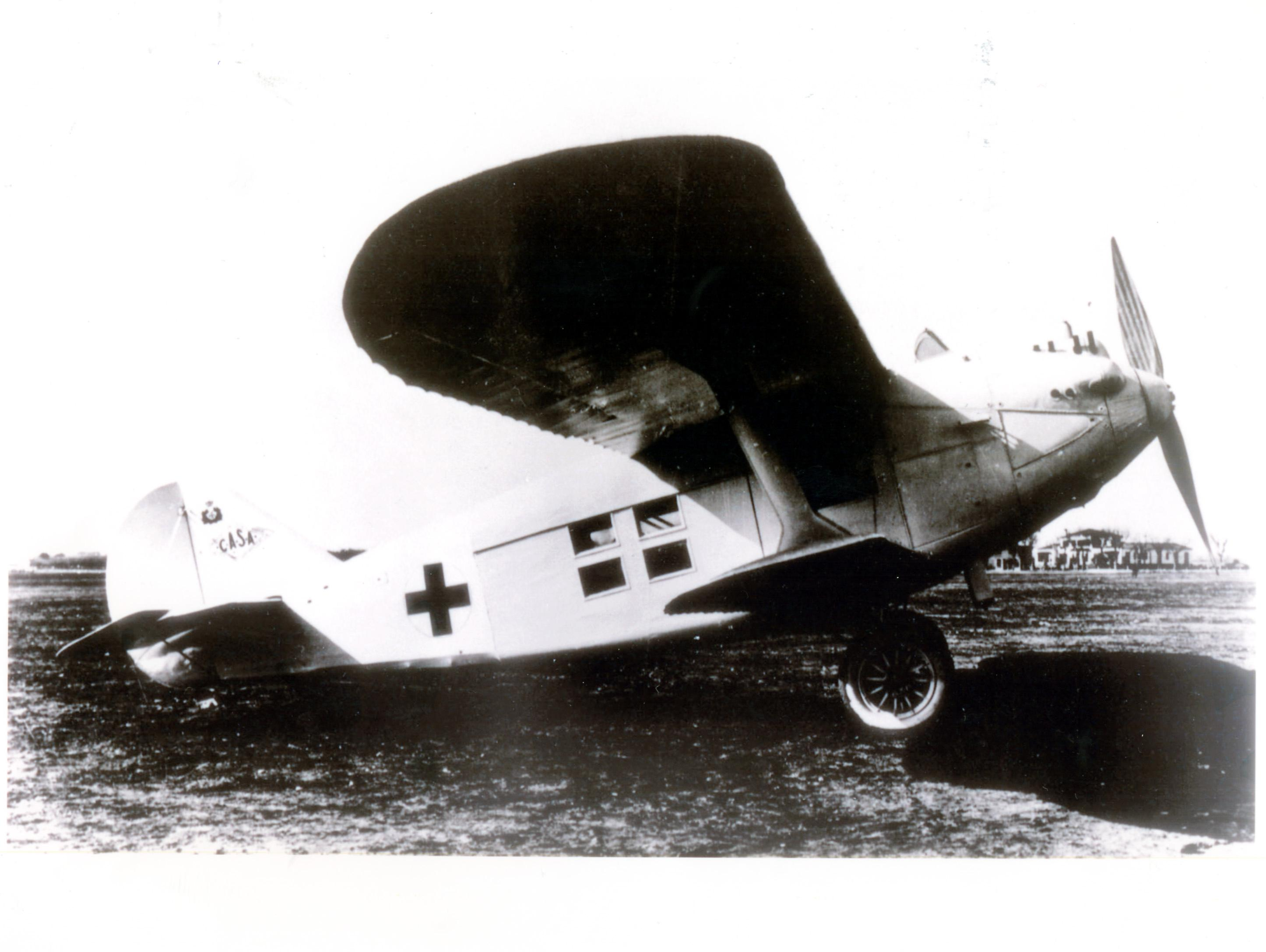

General information
- Type: Airliner
- Manufacturer: Breguet, CASA under licence
- Number built: 6

History
- First flight: 1926

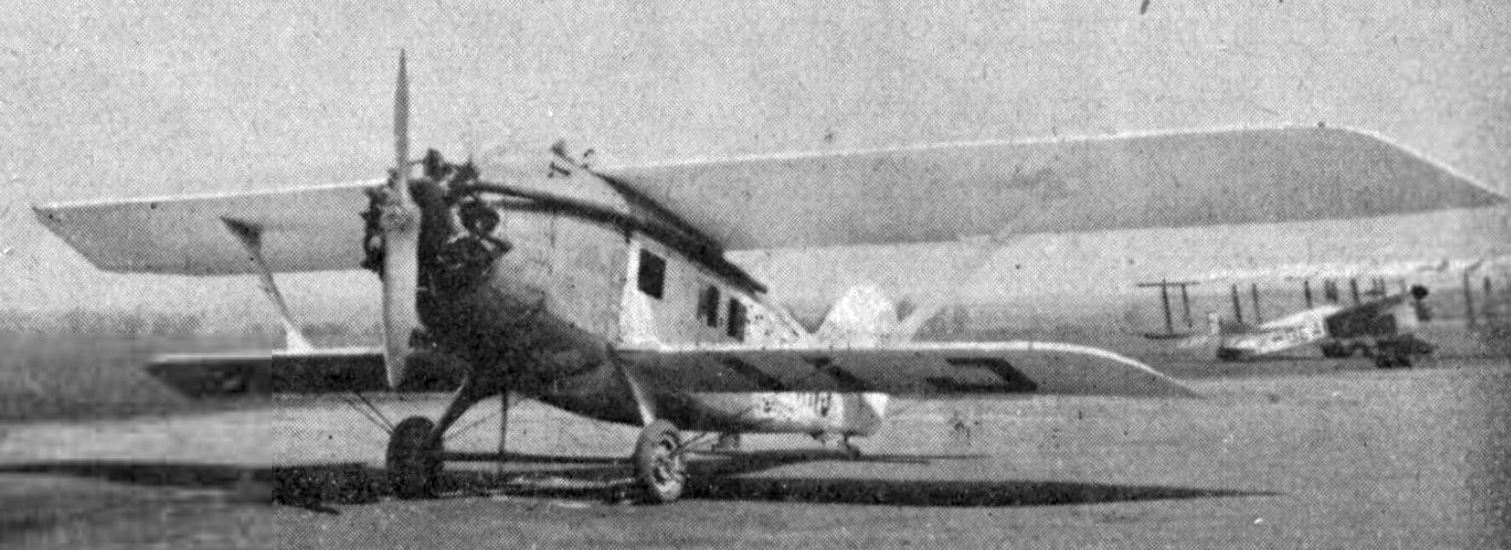
Breguet 26T with original Bristol Jupiter Radial engine

The Bréguet 26T was a French single-engine biplane airliner that first flew in 1926.

== Development ==
The 26T was an attempt by the Breguet company to find a civil market for their 19 military aircraft by mating its wings, tail surfaces and undercarriage to a new fuselage and new engine. The resulting aircraft could carry six passengers in an enclosed cabin, while the pilots sat in an open cockpit ahead of the upper wing. The engine originally chosen was a French-built licensed copy of the Bristol Jupiter radial, but on one of the two Bréguet-built civil examples, this was later changed back to the Lorraine 12Ed inline, as used on the Br.19.

These two aircraft served as predecessors for the definitive civil version of this family, the Breguet 280T, while CASA purchased a licence to build another two in Spain for the domestic market, and France's Aviation Militaire purchased two more as air ambulances under the designation Bre.26TSbis.

== Operational history ==
The first prototype was briefly used by Air Union for trial flights on the Paris–Lyon–Marseille route, but did not enter commercial service. At least one of the CASA-built aircraft was used the Spanish airline Compañía de Líneas Aéreas Subvencionadas (CLASSA) and later by CLASSA's successor airline, Líneas Aéreas Postales Españolas LAPE.

== Operators ==
France

- French Air Force

Kingdom of Spain & Spanish Republic

- Aeronáutica Militar, later in service in the Fuerzas Aéreas de la República Española.

== Specifications (26T) ==
Data from European Transport Aircraft since 1910

General characteristics

- Crew: 1
- Capacity: 6 passengers
- Length: 11.0 m (36 ft 1 in)
- Wingspan: 16.8 m (55 ft 1 in)
- Wing area: 50.5 m^{2} (544 sq ft)
- Empty weight: 1,412 kg (3,113 lb)
- Gross weight: 3,055 kg (6,735 lb)
- Powerplant: 1 × Gnome et Rhône 9Ab nine-cylinder radial engine, 340 kW (450 hp)

Performance

- Cruise speed: 198 km/h (123 mph, 107 kn) at 2,000 m (6,600 ft)
- Range: 600–700 km (370–430 mi, 320–380 nmi)
- Service ceiling: 4,300 m (14,100 ft)

== See also ==
- Breguet 19
