= 1930 Air Union Farman Goliath crash =

1930 crash caused by tailplane structural failure

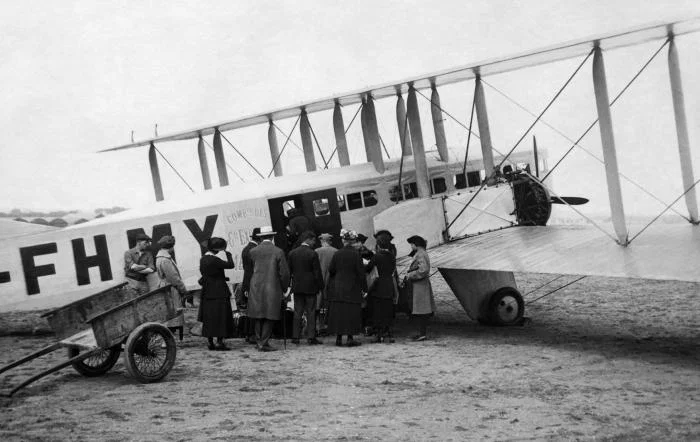
- F-FHMY, the F.60 involved in the accident.

Accident
- Date: 10 February 1930
- Summary: Loss of control following structural failure of tailplane.
- Site: Marden Airfield, Marden, Kent; 51°10′N 0°31′E TQ 759 438

Aircraft
- Aircraft type: Farman F.63 Goliath
- Operator: Air Union
- Registration: F-FHMY
- Flight origin: Le Bourget Airport, Paris
- Destination: Croydon Airport
- Passengers: 3
- Crew: 3
- Fatalities: 2
- Injuries: 4
- Survivors: 4

The 1930 Air Union Farman Goliath crash occurred on 10 February 1930 when a Farman F.63 Goliath of Air Union crashed whilst attempting an emergency landing at Marden Airfield, Kent following the failure of the starboard tailplane. Two of the six people on board were killed.

== Aircraft ==
The aircraft involved was Farman F.63 Goliath F-FHMY, c/n 267. The aircraft was built as a F.60 Goliath and registered in April 1921 to Compagnie des Grands Express Aériens, passing in February 1924 to Compagnie Air Union. On 14 November 1925, it had ditched 7 1/2 miles (12.1 km) off Boulogne and had been badly damaged. The aircraft was given a complete overhaul, returning to service in 1929. The rebuilt aircraft was classified as a F.63 Goliath.

== Accident ==
The aircraft departed Le Bourget at 10:40 am bound for Croydon. It was carrying three French crew and three English passengers. Fifteen minutes after take-off, an engine problem resulted in a return to Le Bourget. No problem was found but the spark plugs were changed as a precaution and the aircraft departed for Croydon again.

After the aircraft had passed Staplehurst, a snapping noise came from the tailplane and the aircraft lost 2,000 feet (610 m) in altitude. The starboard tailplane had failed. One of the mechanics told the passengers that an emergency landing was to be attempted. The passengers were asked to move to the rear of the cabin. Just before 1 pm, as the aircraft attempted to land at Marden Airfield, the pilot cut power to the engines at an altitude of 10 feet (3 m). The aircraft then rose to an altitude of about 100 feet (30 m) and then stalled and crashed. A few seconds later, fire broke out in the wreckage of the airliner. One of the passengers managed to escape on his own. The pilot was pulled from the wreckage by one of the two mechanics. Villagers rushed to the aid of the victims, but the survivors had all escaped from the wreckage by the time the first of them arrived. Two of the passengers, who were returning from honeymoon in Paris, were killed. The injured were taken to the West Kent Hospital, Maidstone.

An inquest was opened by the Cranbrook Coroner on 12 February at Pagehurst Farm, Staplehurst into the deaths of the victims. Witnesses gave evidence of the failure of the starboard elevator. The inquest was adjourned initially to 13 March in the expectation that the crew of the aircraft would be fit enough to attend. The inquest resumed on 28 March at Staplehurst. Evidence was produced to show that the aircraft was airworthy when it departed Paris, and that the actions of the crew were correct. The 1921-built aircraft had been completely overhauled and had returned to service in 1929, following the ditching in 1925. The cause of death in each case was shock and smoke inhalation. A verdict of "Accidental Death" was returned in both cases.
