= August 1923 Air Union Farman Goliath crash =

Aviation accident in the United Kingdom

Coordinates: 51°16′16″N 0°25′41″E

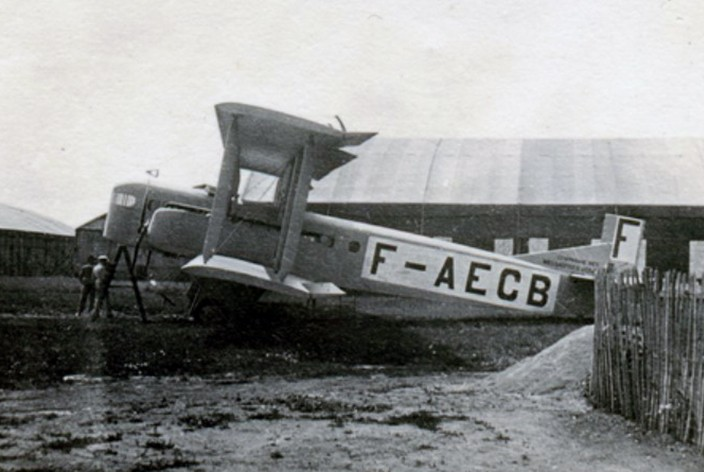
- F-AECB, the F.60 involved in the accident.

Accident
- Date: 27 August 1923
- Summary: Engine failure, passenger error, loss of control
- Site: East Malling, Kent, United Kingdom

Aircraft
- Aircraft type: Farman F.60 Goliath
- Operator: Air Union
- Registration: F-AECB
- Flight origin: Le Bourget Airport, Paris, France
- 1st stopover: Berck, Pas-de-Calais, France
- 2nd stopover: Lympne, Kent, United Kingdom (unscheduled)
- Destination: Croydon Airport, Surrey, United Kingdom
- Passengers: 11
- Crew: 2
- Fatalities: 1
- Injuries: 9
- Survivors: 12

The August 1923 Air Union Farman Goliath crash occurred on 27 August 1923 when a Farman F.60 Goliath of Air Union crashed at East Malling, Kent, United Kingdom following an engine failure and reported panic amongst the passengers. One person was killed and nine were injured, including celebrated French actor Jean Murat.

== Aircraft ==
The aircraft involved was Farman F.60 Goliath F-AECB, c/n 4. The aircraft had entered service in April 1922 with Compagnie des Messageries Aériennes, passing to Air Union in January 1923.

== Flight ==
The aircraft was operating a scheduled international flight from Le Bourget Airport, Paris, France to Croydon Airport, Surrey, United Kingdom, via Berck, Pas-de-Calais, France. The aircraft departed from Le Bourget at about 12:30 local time (11:30 GMT) with two crew and eight passengers on board. A scheduled stop was made at Berck, where another three passengers boarded. Due to weather conditions, a precautionary landing was made at Lympne, Kent, where a leak in the port radiator was attended to by the mechanic.

== Accident ==
After a delay in excess of half an hour, the aircraft departed from Lympne for Croydon. About 45 minutes after take-off from Lympne, as the aircraft flew over East Farleigh, the starboard engine failed. The aircraft was then flying at about 65 knots (120 km/h) at an altitude of just under 2,000 feet (610 m). The pilot altered course, intending to land at either Marden or Penshurst. As the Farman Goliath was incapable of maintaining level flight with only one engine operating, the pilot decided to make an emergency landing. He asked the mechanic to ask two passengers to move towards the rear of the aircraft. This instruction was apparently misunderstood by the passengers, as four of them moved towards the rear of the aircraft. This affected the centre of gravity of the aircraft, which then entered into a spin. It crashed at East Malling at about 17:30 GMT, but there was no fire. The aircraft was written off in the accident.

Villagers went to the assistance of the victims, and extricated them from the wreckage. Passenger Leslie Gunther of London was killed. Six people were taken to West Kent General Hospital, Maidstone for treatment. Two ambulances from Maidstone Ambulance Brigade attended. Three less seriously injured people were treated at a house in East Malling.

== Inquest ==
An inquest opened on 30 August at the Ship Inn, East Malling. A survivor of the accident denied that there had been any panic amongst the passengers following the failure of the starboard engine, and that the moving of four passengers from the front cabin to the rear of the aircraft was on the instructions of the mechanic. The inquest was adjourned until 11 September to allow other victims to recover sufficiently to be able to give evidence. At the resumed inquest, the pilot gave evidence. The Coroner decided that nothing was to be gained from delaying the inquest further, and the jury returned a verdict of "accidental death" on the victim.
