= Bréguet 19 =

1922 French military aircraft

Br.19
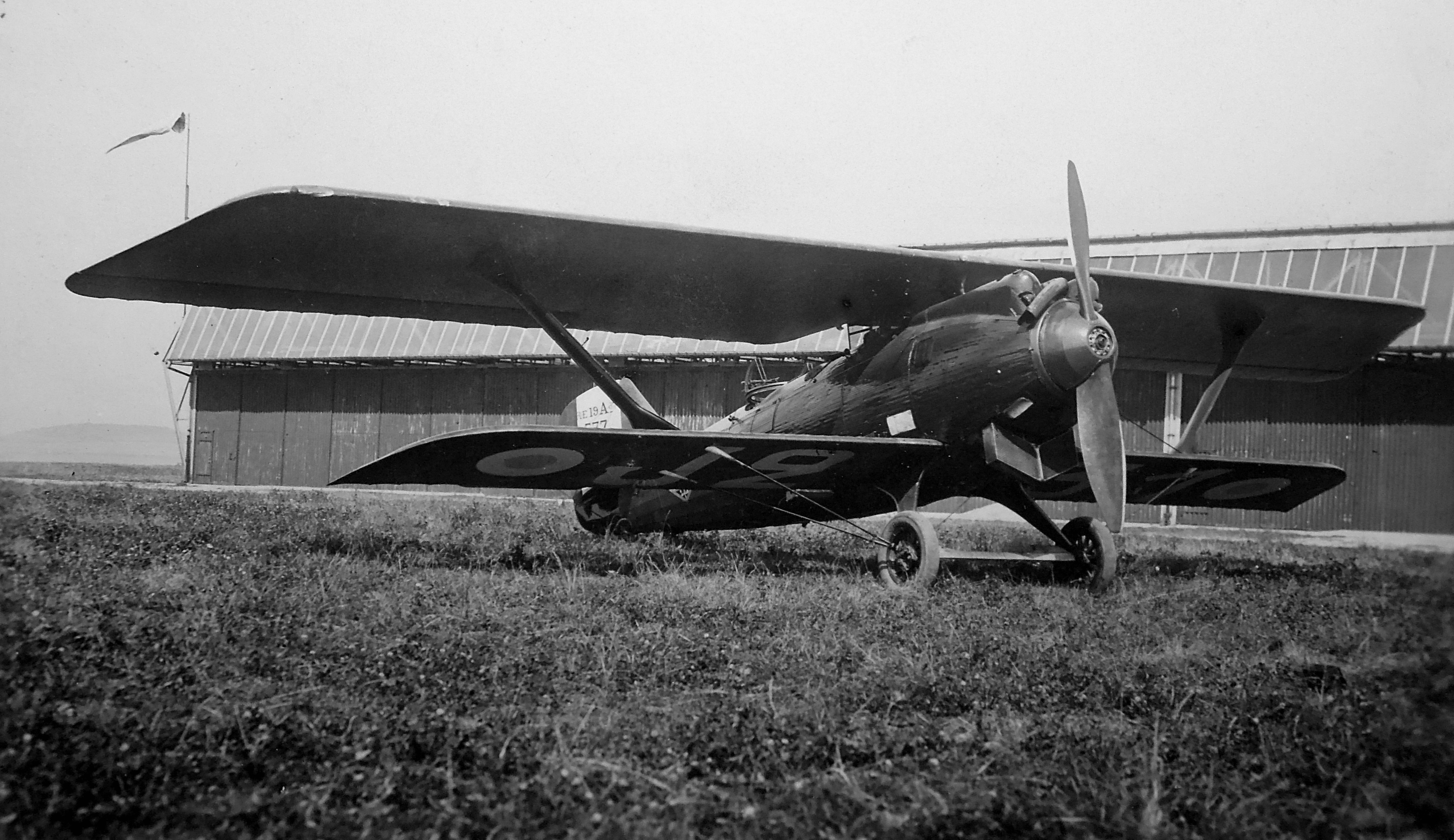
- The Breguet Br.19A2 two-seat attack bomber

General information
- Type: Light bomber/reconnaissance aircraft
- Manufacturer: Breguet Aviation
- Designer: Marcel Vuillerme
- Status: retired
- Primary user: French Air Force
- Number built: ~ 2,700

History
- Manufactured: 1924-
- First flight: March 1922

The Breguet 19 (Breguet XIX, Br.19 or Bre.19) was a sesquiplane bomber and reconnaissance aircraft which was also used for long-distance flights and was designed by the French Breguet company and produced from 1924.

== Development ==
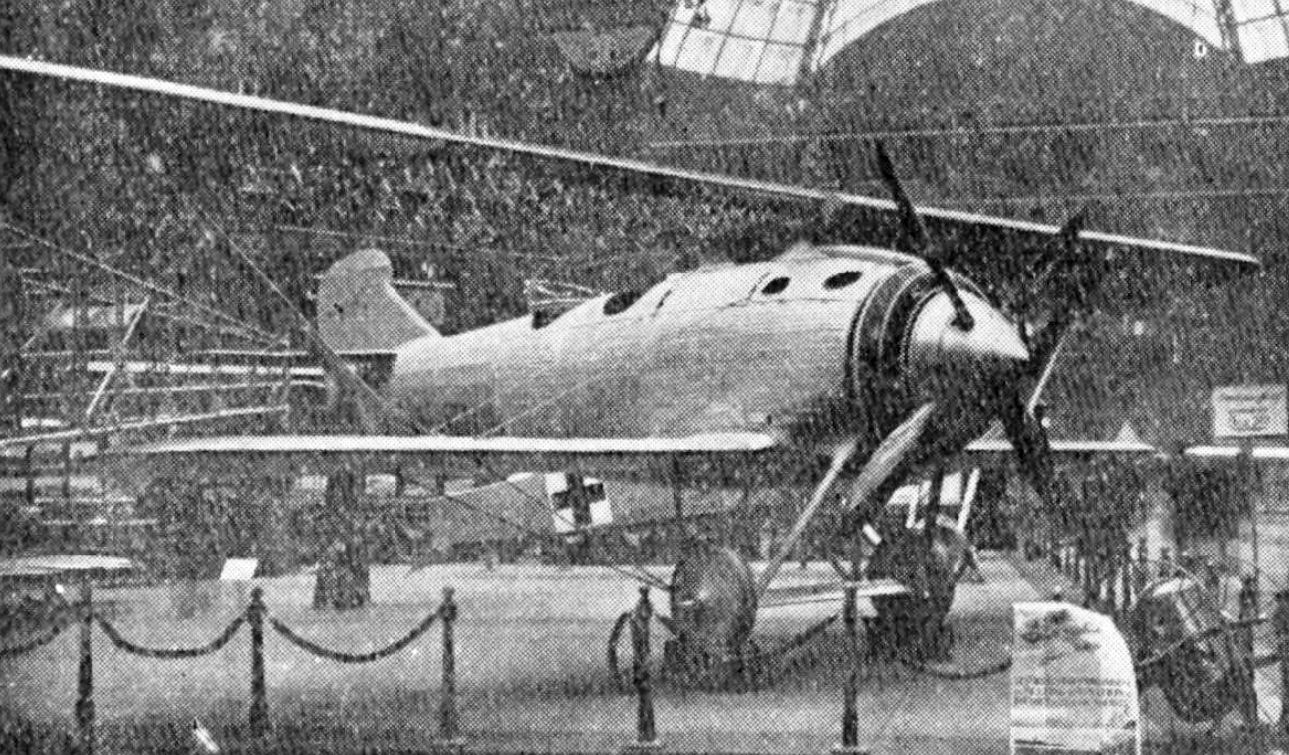
Breguet XIX prototype. Photo from L'Aerophile December,1921

The Breguet 19 was designed as a successor to a highly successful World War I Breguet 14 bomber. Initially, it was to be powered by a 340 kW (450 hp) Bugatti U-16 engine, driving a four-blade propeller, and a prototype was shown on the 7th Paris Air Show in November 1921 with this engine. A revised design was flown in March 1922 with a single 340 kW (450 hp) Renault 12Kb inline engine. After trials, the Breguet 19 was ordered by the French Army's Aéronautique Militaire in September 1923.

Mass production, both for the Aéronautique Militaire and export, began in France in 1924.

== Design ==
The Breguet 19 was a sesquiplane in which the lower wing was substantially smaller than the upper wing, with a conventional layout and braced wings. The fuselage was ellipsoid in cross-section and built up from a frame of duralumin pipes. Breguet made extensive use of duralumin as a construction material which resulted in an unusually light structure for its size, instead of steel or wood. It was faster than other bombers, and even many fighter aircraft which resulted in widespread interest which was further increased by successful record flights. The forward fuselage was covered with duralumin sheets, while the tail, rear fuselage and wings were covered with linen. It had a conventional fixed landing gear with a tail skid. The crew of two, pilot and observer/bombardier, sat in tandem in open cockpits and were provided with dual controls.

A wide variety of engine types were fitted, mostly water-cooled V-12 or W-12 inline engines, including the following:

- Breguet-Bugatti U.16: 370 kW (500 hp) - used on Br 19 and Br 23
- Farman 12We: 370 kW (500 hp) - used on Br 19-5
- Gnome-Rhône 9Ab Jupiter: 310 kW (420 hp) used on Br 19 for Yugoslavia
- Gnome-Rhône 9C Jupiter: 310 kW (420 hp) - used on Br 19-4
- Gnome-Rhône Mistral Major 14Kbrs: 520 kW (700 hp) - used on Br 19-8
- Hispano-Suiza 12Ha: 340 kW (450 hp) - used on Br 19
- Hispano-Suiza 12Hb: 370 kW (500 hp) - used on Br 19-6, Br 19 B2 and Br 19 CN2
- Hispano-Suiza 12Lb: 450 kW (600 hp) - used on Br 19ter
- Hispano-Suiza 12Nb: 480 kW (650 hp) - used on Br 19-7
- Hispano-Suiza 12Ybrs: 640 kW (860 hp) - used on Br 19-9
- Renault 12: 340 kW (450 hp) - used on Br 19
- Renault 12Kb: 340 kW (450 hp) - used on Br 19
- Renault 12Kd: 360 kW (480 hp) - used on Br 19
- Liberty L-12: 340 kW (450 hp) - used on Br 19bis
- Lorraine 12Da: 280 kW (370 hp) - used on Br 19
- Lorraine-Dietrich 12Db V12: 300 kW (400 hp) - used on Br 19
- Lorraine-Dietrich 12Eb: 340 kW (450 hp) - used on Br 19
- Lorraine-Dietrich 12Ed W12 with reduction gear: - used on Br 19
- Lorraine-Dietrich 12Hfrs: 540 kW (720 hp) - used on Br 19-10 and Br 230
- Salmson 18Cma: 370 kW (500 hp) - used on Br 19-3

A fixed 7.7 mm (0.303 in) Vickers machine gun with an interrupter gear was operated by the pilot, while the observer had twin 7.7 mm (0.303 in) Lewis Guns on a gun ring. There was also a fourth machine gun, which could be fired by the observer downwards through an opening in the floor. The Br.19CN2 night fighter variant was fitted with two fixed forward-firing machine guns. The bomber could carry up to 472 kg (1,041 lb) of bombs under the fuselage, or small bombs up to 50 kg (110 lb) vertically in an internal bomb bay. The reconnaissance variant could carry 12 x 10 kg (22 lb) bombs. The reconnaissance variant had a camera mounting, which was optional on the bomber variant. All variants were equipped radio.

== Operational history ==
The Breguet 19 had its baptism of fire in the Spanish Civil War. The Basque Country was bombed for the first time in its history when Otxandio was hit by a Breguet 19 on 22 July 1936 by Franco's nationalist forces. The Breguet 19 was the mainstay of the Spanish Republican Air Force's (the Government's) bomber fleet.

=== Greece ===
In the Greco-Italian War which took place during World War II, 18 Breguets were operational at the outbreak of war, with 1 Observation (or Army Cooperation) Mira, under I Corp Command, based at Perigiali, near Corinth and with 2 Observation Mira under II Corps command, based at Larissa and Kozani. On 4 November 1940, a Royal Hellenic Air Force Breguet from 2 Mira was sent looking for the attacking 3rd Julia Alpine Division, locating it in a mountain pass near Metsovo. Three more Breguets sent to bomb the Italian division were in turn attacked by three Fiat CR.42 fighters. A Breguet was shot down, one crash-landed and the third returned to base, badly damaged.

== Variants ==
Br.19.01
The first Breguet 19 prototype, which first flew in March 1922 which was later bought by the Spanish government.

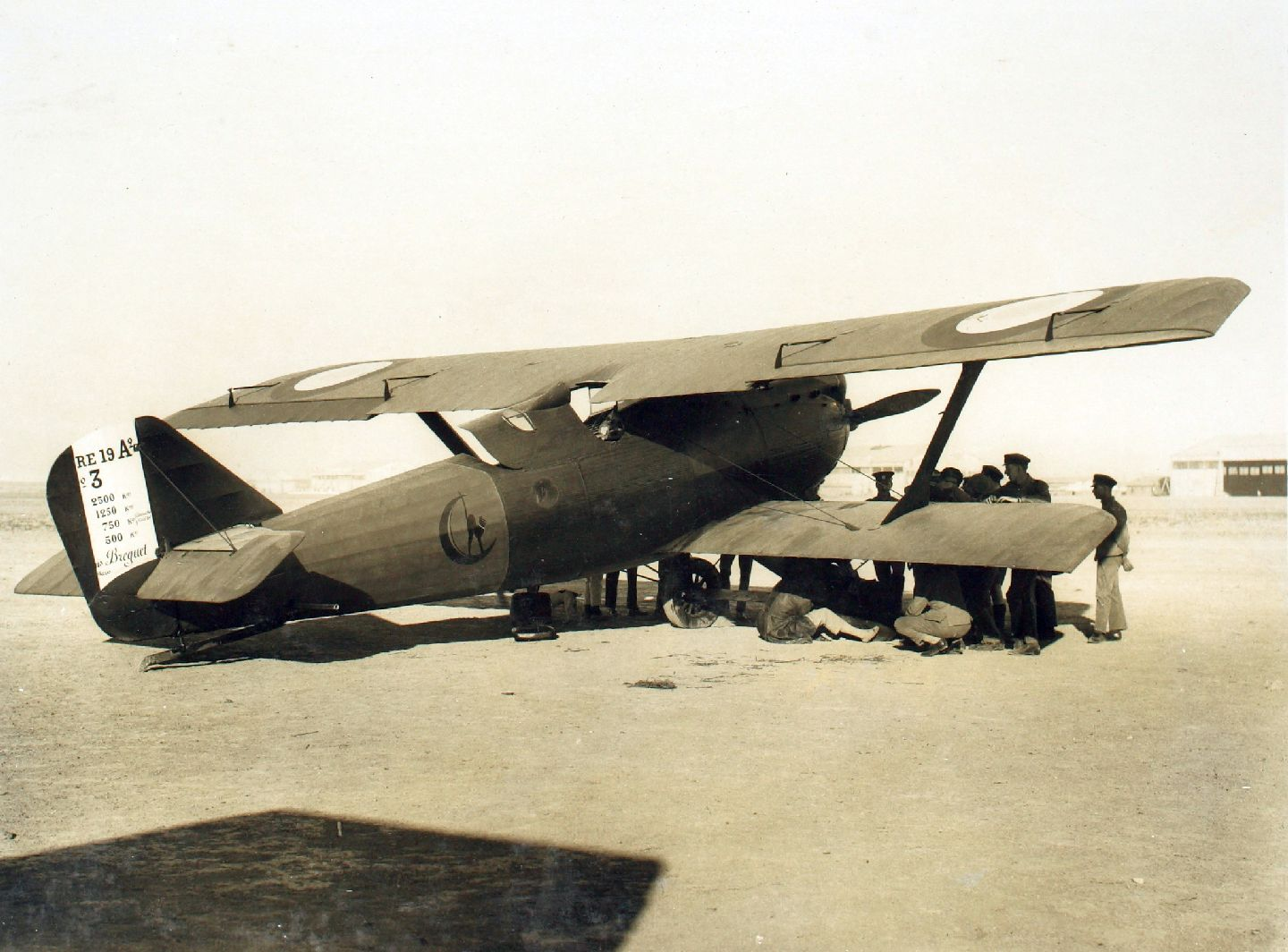
Breguet Bre.19 No.3, flown by French aviator Georges Pelletier d'Oisy, at RAF Hinaidi, India en route from Paris to Tokyo in 1924

Br.19.02 to Br.19.02.011
Pre-production aircraft, whose fuselage was lengthened by 600 mm (24 in). Br.19.02 was evaluated by Yugoslavia in 1923.

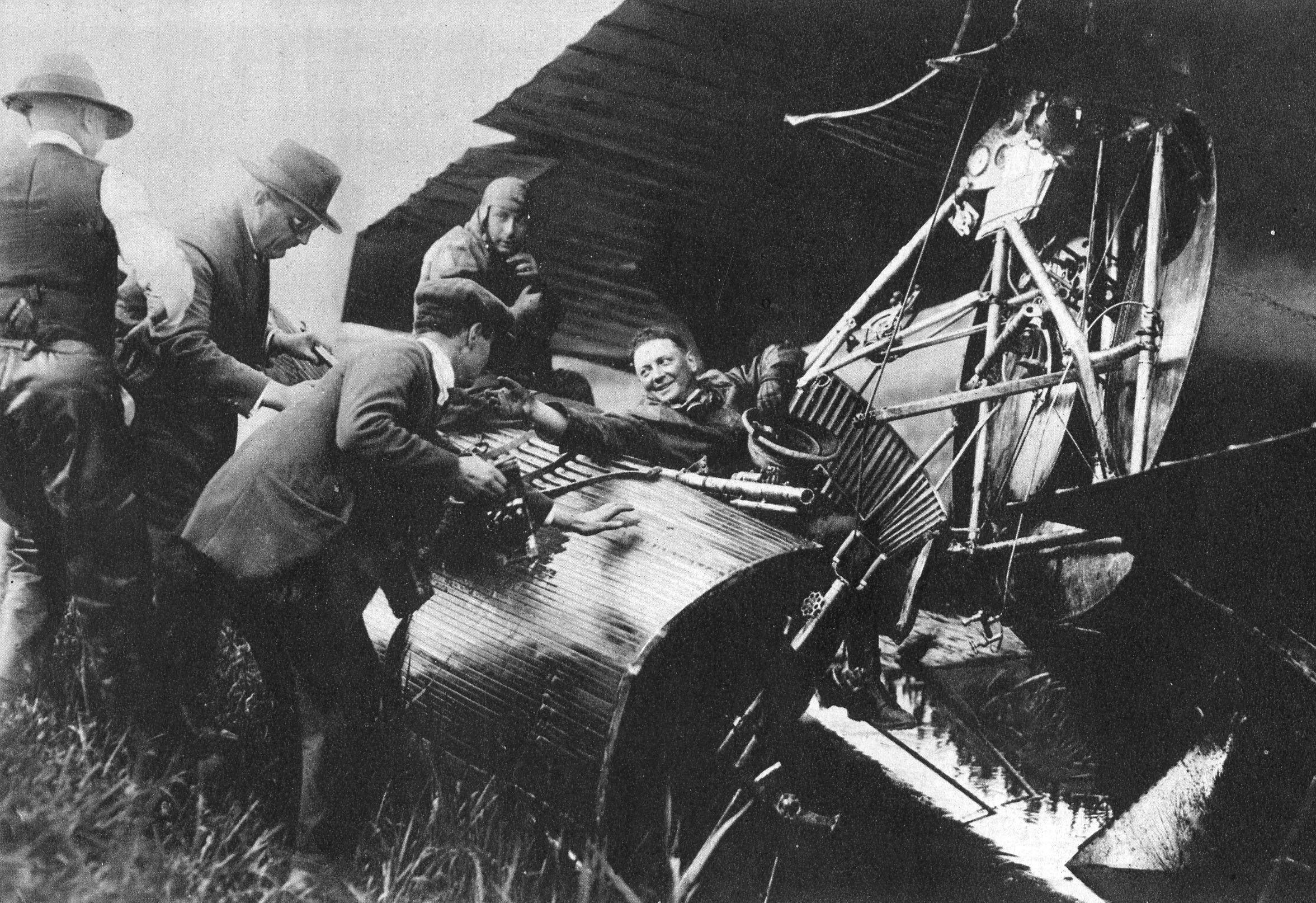
Breguet Bre.19 No.3 flown by French aviator Georges Pelletier d'Oisy crashed at Shanghai on 20 May 1924, during Pelletier d'Oisy's Paris to Tokyo flight, which was completed in Breguet Bre.14A2 No.2097

Br.19 A.2
Two-seat reconnaissance aircraft.
Br.19 B.2
Two-seat light bomber biplane. These first two variants were the most numerous, and were practically identical. They used a variety of engines, the most popular being the 300 kW (400 hp) Lorraine-Dietrich 12Db, the 340 kW (450 hp) Lorraine-Dietrich 12Eb, the Renault 12K, the Hispano-Suiza 12H and the Farman 12We.
Br.19 CN.2
Night fighter version, almost identical to the A.2 reconnaissance variant with one additional forward-firing machine gun.
Br.19 GR
(Grand Raid) A variant specially modified for long-distance flights, after early long-range attempts were made with the regular Br.19 A2 no.23 fitted with additional fuel tanks. The first Br.19 GR (no.64) had a fuel tank of about 2,000 L (440 imp gal; 530 US gal) and captured the world distance record in 1925.
Br.19 GR 3000 litres
In 1926, three additional aircraft were modified to Br.19 GR 3000 litre specifications. They had larger fuel tanks fitted in the fuselage, with a total capacity between 2,900 and 3,000 L (640 and 660 imp gal; 770 and 790 US gal). The cockpit was moved slightly aft, and the wingspan was increased to 14.83 m (48.7 ft). The three aircraft were fitted with different engines: the first one had a 370 kW (500 hp) Hispano-Suiza 12Hb, the others had 410 kW (550 hp) Renault 12K and 390 kW (520 hp) Farman 12Wers engines. In 1927, one aircraft received a new 450 kW (600 hp) Hispano 12Lb engine, its fuel capacity was extended to 3,500 L (770 imp gal; 920 US gal) and its wingspan was further increased by 1 m (3 ft 3 in). It was christened Nungesser et Coli after the two airmen who disappeared in a transatlantic flight attempt in May 1927. A fifth aircraft was built for Greece, called Hellas, with a 410 kW (550 hp) Hispano 12Hb. (Other Br.19 aircraft may have received additional fuel tanks for long distance flights, but these were not officially called Br.19 GR. Some sources mention a Belgian Br.19 GR, maybe a confusion with the Belgian Br.19 TR.)

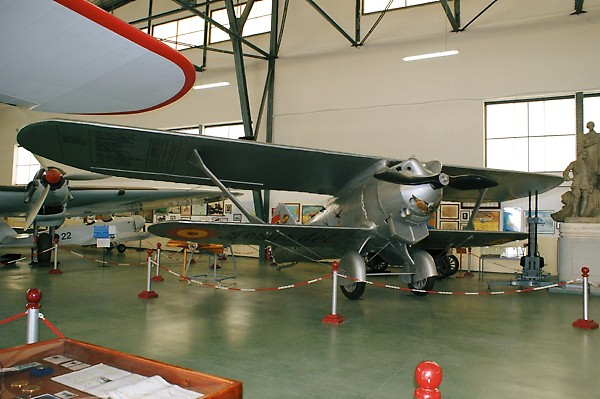
Jesus del Gran Poder in the Museo del Aire at Cuatro Vientos Air Base, Madrid, Spain

Br.19 TR Bidon
Built in 1927 with various aerodynamic refinements and 3,735 L (822 imp gal; 987 US gal) of fuel in the fuselage. With an additional fuel tank in the wing, the total fuel capacity was 4,125 L (907 imp gal; 1,090 US gal). Five were built by Breguet and two by the Spanish company CASA. Three of the French aircraft had a 450 kW (600 hp) Hispano-Suiza 12Lb, one had a 410 kW (550 hp) Renault 12K, and one had a 340 kW (450 hp) Lorraine 12Eb. The first Bidon Hispano was sold to Belgium, and the Bidon Renault was sold to China after a Paris–Beijing flight. The third Bidon Hispano became the French Br.19 TF. The second Spanish Bidon was christened Jesús del Gran Poder, and flew from Sevilla to Bahia (Brazil).

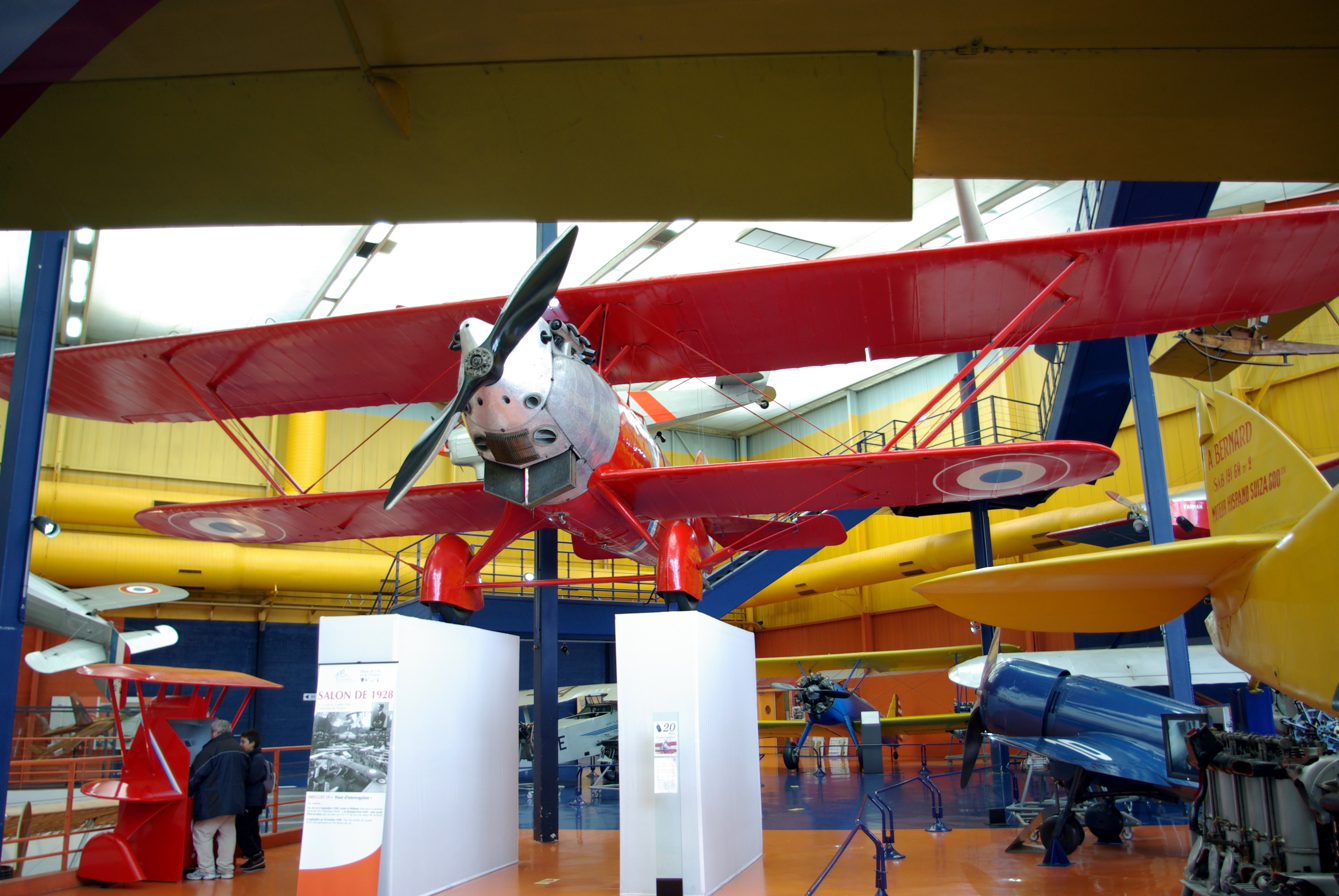
Point d'Interrogation at the Musée de l'Air et de l'Espace at le Bourget airport

Br.19 TF Super Bidon
The last and most advanced long-distance variant, built in 1929, and designed for transatlantic flight. The French Super Bidon was the third Br.19 TR Hispano, named Point d'Interrogation, with a modified fuselage, a wingspan of 18.3 m (60 ft), and 5,370 L (1,180 imp gal; 1,420 US gal) total fuel capacity. It was powered by a 450 kW (600 hp) Hispano-Suiza 12Lb engine, later replaced by a 480 kW (650 hp) Hispano-Suiza 12NLb. Another aircraft, with a closed canopy, was built in Spain in 1933. Christened Cuatro Vientos, it flew from Sevilla to Cuba, and disappeared while attempting to reach Mexico.

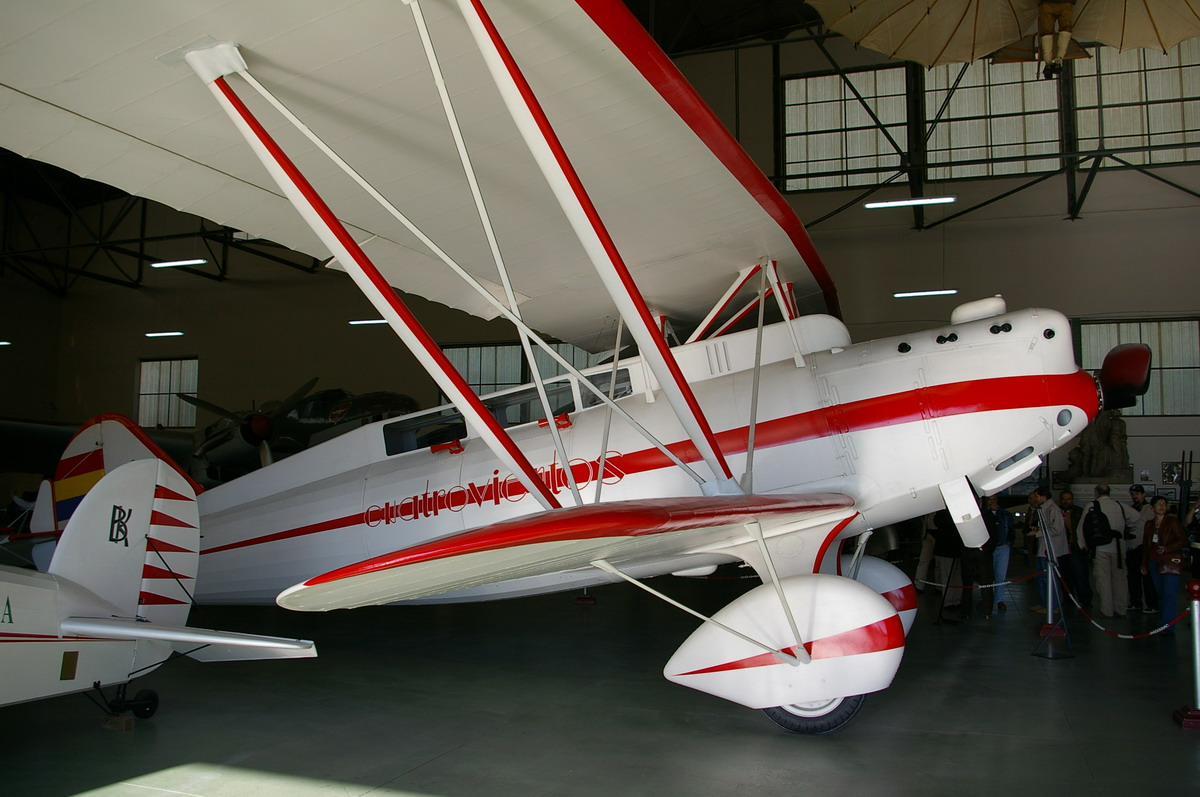
A replica of the Cuatro Vientos in the Museo del Aire at Cuatro Vientos Air Base, Madrid, Spain

Br.19 ter
Utilizing the experience with long-distance variants, this improved reconnaissance variant was developed in 1928, maybe for export purposes. It remained a prototype only (with civilian register F-AIXP).
Br.19.7
The most popular of the late variants developed in 1930 with a 450 kW (600 hp) Hispano-Suiza 12Nb engine, giving a maximum speed of 242 km/h (150 mph). The first five machines were converted in France for Yugoslavia, then a number were built in Yugoslavia, and a further 50 built in France for export to Turkey.
Br.19.8
With a 580 kW (780 hp) Wright GR-1820-F-56 Cyclone radial engine, 48 Br.19.7 airframes were eventually completed as Br.19.8's in Yugoslavia. Maximum speed was 279 km/h (173 mph).
Br.19.9
A single prototype developed in Yugoslavia with a 640 kW (860 hp) Hispano-Suiza 12Ybrs engine.
Br.19.10
A single prototype developed in Yugoslavia with a 540 kW (720 hp) Lorraine-Dietrich 12Hfrs Petrel engine.
Br.19 hydro
(Breguet 19 seaplane) Fitted with twin floats as a seaplane, a single prototype (no.1132) was produced for France. Another aircraft sold to Japan was fitted with floats built there by Nakajima.
Nakajima-Breguet Reconnaissance Seaplane
Nakajima built Breguet 19-A2B seaplanes.
Br.19T
Br.19T bis
Br.19 Limousine
(for six passengers, with a thicker fuselage), but these were never built.
Breguet Br.26T
(1926)
Breguet Br.26TSbis
Breguet Br.280T
Breguet Br.281T
Breguet Br.284T

In total, more than 2,000 Breguet 19s were manufactured in France, and about 700 license-built by Spanish CASA, Japanese Nakajima, Belgian SABCA and the Yugoslavian aircraft factory in Kraljevo.

== Operators ==
Argentina

- Argentine Air Force operated 25 Lorraine-Dietrich 12Eb powered aircraft.

Belgium

- Belgian Air Force bought six Br.19 B2s in 1924, and further 146 A2s and B2s were manufactured in under licence by the SABCA works in 1926–30. They were powered with Lorraine-Dietrich 12Eb and Hispano-Suiza 12Ha engines, and used until the late 1930s.

Bolivia

- Bolivian Air Force bought ten aircraft and used them during the Chaco war against Paraguay.

Brazil

- Brazilian Air Force operated five aircraft.

China

- Manchurian warlord Zhang Zuolin is claimed to have ordered 70 Breguet 19s, but these were not delivered. Similarly, an order for four Br.19s from the central government was not met. Manchuria did acquire a single Br.19A2 in 1926 and a Br.19.GR in 1929.

Independent State of Croatia

- Zrakoplovstvo Nezavisne Države Hrvatske seized 46 aircraft used for anti-partizan missions.

France

- The French Army's Aéronautique Militaire operated its first Breguet 19s in the A2 variant from the autumn of 1924, the B2 variant from June 1926, then the fighter C2 and CN2 variants. In the late 1920s and early 1930s, they were the most numerous French combat aircraft. In metropolitan France, they were withdrawn from service in the early 1930s; the last Br.19 CN2 was withdrawn in 1935. Until 1938, they were still used by the French Air Force (successor to the Aéronautique Militaire) in colonies in the Middle East and North Africa - among others, they were used there to suppress native rebellions.
- French Navy

Greece

- Hellenic Air Force acquired 30 Breguet 19 A2s and some were used against invading Italian forces in 1940, delivering valuable information on Italian movements.

Italy

- Regia Aeronautica bought one aircraft for tests.

Japan

In April 1925, the factory Nakajima Hikoki KK acquired two aircraft. The purchase was the work of the well-known promoter of aviation, the Asahi Shinbun newspaper group. A production license was acquired. Nakajima offered a float-equipped version to the navy, and another was entered into a competition for maritime reconnaissance but was unsuccessful. One plane flew again with wheeled undercarriage and civilian designation J-BBFO as a mail plane.

Iran

- Iranian Air Force: Operated two aircraft (19A2). One in black and white and the other in silver.

Poland

- Polish Air Force bought 250 Breguet 19 A2s and B2s, with 340 kW (450 hp) Lorraine-Dietrich 12Eb engines, in 1925–30. 20 aircraft were reportedly the longer-range reconnaissance variant, but details are not known. the first Br.19 entered Polish service in 1926, but most were delivered in 1929–30. They were withdrawn from combat units in 1932–37, and used in training units until 1939. They were not used in combat during the Invasion of Poland of 1939 and most were destroyed on the ground.

Romania

- Royal Romanian Air Force bought 50 Breguet 19 A2s and B2s in 1927, then 108 Br.19 B2s, and five Br.19.7's in 1930. They were in service until 1938.

Soviet Union

- Soviet Air Force bought one aircraft for tests.

Kingdom of Spain & Spanish Republic

- Aeronáutica Militar bought a prototype and a license in 1923, and started production in the CASA| works, in A2 and B2 variants. The first 19 aircraft were imported, the next 26 completed from French parts, then 177 were manufactured (50 of them had Hispano-Suiza engine, the rest the Lorraine-Dietrich 12Eb engine). The Breguet 19 was the basic equipment of Spanish bomber and reconnaissance units until the initial period of the Spanish Civil War. In July 1936, there were less than hundred in service in the Spanish Republican Air Force. They were actively used as bombers during the war, especially on the government's side. In 1936, the Nationalists bought an additional twenty from Poland through the SEPEWE syndicate. With an advent of more modern fighters, the Br.19 suffered many losses, and after 1937 were withdrawn from frontline service. The Republican side lost 28 aircraft, and Nationalists lost 10 (including 2 Republican and 1 Nationalist aircraft, that deserted). The remaining aircraft were used for training until 1940.

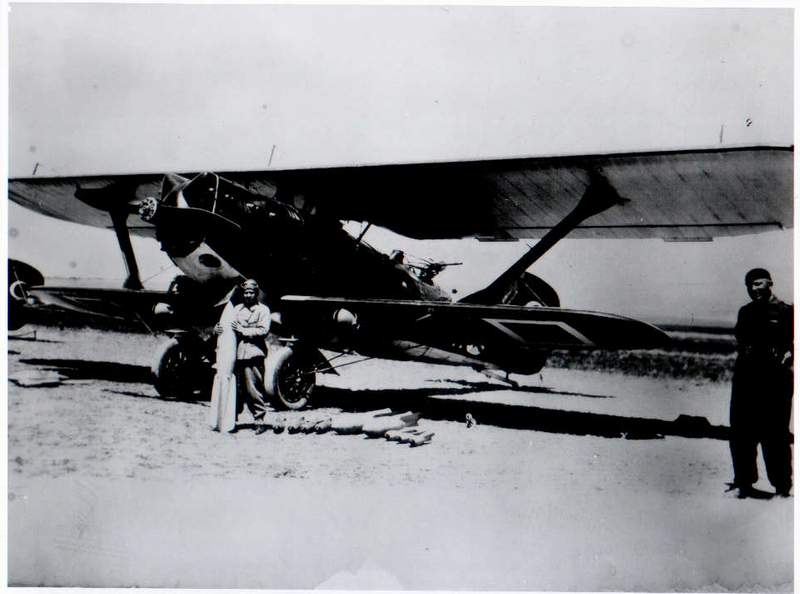
Sabiha Gökçen holding a bomb before the bombardment mission over Dersim with her Breguet 19.

Turkey

- Turkish Air Force bought 20 Br.19 B2s, then 50 Br.19.7s in 1932. Some of these aircraft were used in bombardment and reconnaissance missions during the Dersim Rebellion.

United Kingdom

- Royal Air Force bought one aircraft for tests.

Uruguay

- Uruguayan Air Force

Venezuela

- Venezuelan Air Force operated 12 aircraft.

Kingdom of Yugoslavia

- Yugoslav Royal Air Force bought 100 Br.19 A2s in 1924, and in 1927 acquired a license to manufacture them in a new factory in Kraljevo. The first batch of 85 aircraft were assembled from French parts, and a further 215 were built from scratch. The first 150 aircraft in Yugoslavian service had Lorraine-Dietrich engines, the next 150 – 370 kW (500 hp) Hispano-Suiza 12Hb engines, and the last 100 – 310 kW (420 hp) Gnome-Rhone Jupiter 9Ab radial engines. From 1932, the Br.19.7 variant was manufactured – the first five were built in France, the next 75 in Kraljevo (51 according to other publications), and a further 48 aircraft, lacking engines, were completed in 1935–1937 as Br.19.8's, with 580 kW (780 hp) Wright Cyclone radial engines. (Some publications give different numbers of Yugoslavian Bre.19s). Some of these Yugoslavian aircraft were used in combat after the German attack on Yugoslavia in 1941.

Yugoslavia

- SFR Yugoslav Air Force operated one Croatian Br.19 taken by its pilot and delivered to the partisans of Tito, and used in June–July 1942, until it was shot down. Another two, captured by the new Communist government forces in April 1945, were used to pursue Ustashes.

== Record variants ==
Both standard and modified Breguet 19s were used for numerous record-breaking flights. The first was the Br.19 prototype, which won a military aircraft speed contest in Madrid on 17 February 1923. On 12 March 1923, it also set an international altitude record of 5,992 m (19,659 ft) carrying a 500 kg (1,100 lb) load. It was later bought by the Spanish government.

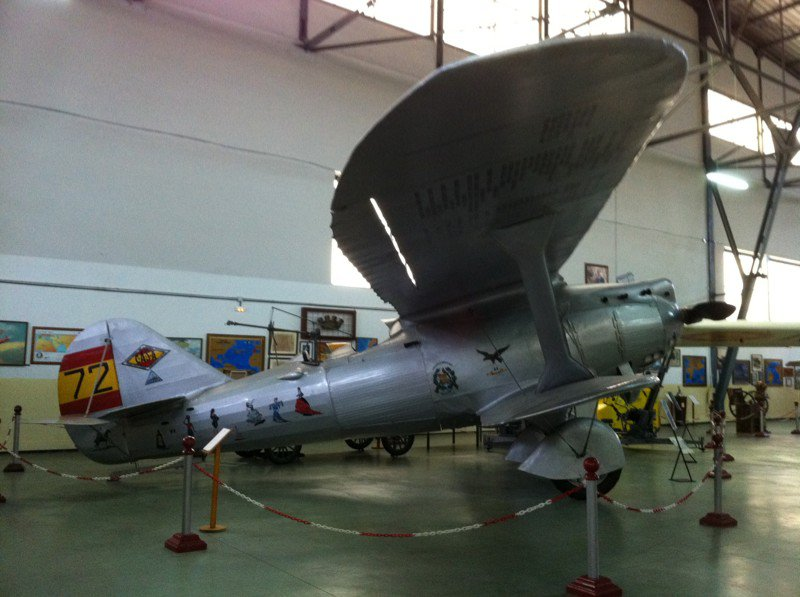
The Jesús del Gran Poder, a special version of the Breguet 19 that flew to Brazil from Spain in 1929

Many crews made long-distance flights in Br.19s. In February 1925, Thieffry flew from Brussels to Leopoldville in central Africa, a distance of 8,900 km (5,500 mi). Two Br.19 A2s were bought by the Japanese Asahi Shimbun newspaper and fitted with additional fuel tanks. They were flown by H. Abe and K. Kawachi on the Tokyo-Paris-London route in July 1925, covering 13,800 km (8,600 mi). Between 27 August and 25 September 1926, the Polish crew of Boleslaw Orlinski flew the Warsaw-Tokyo route (10,300 km (6,400 mi)) and back, in a modified Br.19 A2, despite the fact that one of its lower wings was broken on the way. On 8 June 1928 a modified Greek Br.A2 ("ΕΛΛΑΣ" en: Hellas), flown by C. Adamides and E. Papadakos, embarked on a long distance tour around the Mediterranean landing without incident at Tatoi airfield, Athens, on 1 July. Between 1927 and 1930, Romanian, Yugoslavian and Polish Br.19s were often used in Little Entente air races.

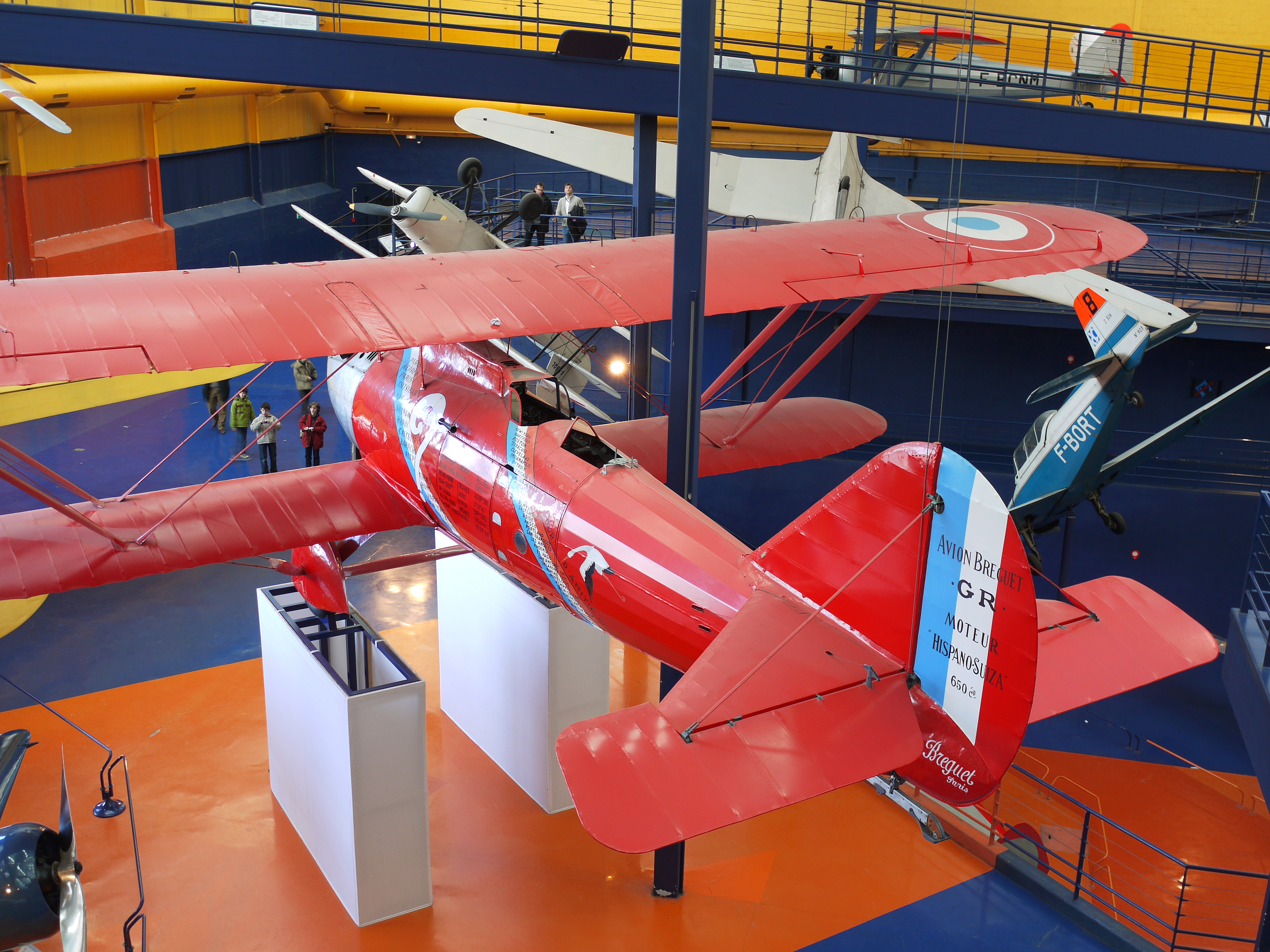
Point D'Interrogation at Le Bourget

Breguet 19 GRs and TRs set several world records, mostly of long-distance non-stop flights, starting with Arrachart and Lemaitre's 3,166 km (1,967 mi) flight from Paris to Villa Cisneros in 24½ hours on 2–3 February 1925. On 14–15 July 1926, Girier and Dordilly set a new record of 4,716 km (2,930 mi) between Paris and Omsk, beaten on 31 August-1 September by Challe and Weiser's 5,174 km (3,215 mi), and on 28 October by Dieudonne Costes and Rignot's 5,450 km (3,390 mi). From 10 October 1927 – 14 April 1928, Costes and Le Brix flew a Br.19 GR (named Nungesser-Coli) around the world, covering 57,000 km (35,000 mi) - though the journey between San Francisco and Tokyo was taken by ship.

The Super Bidon was created especially for the purpose of a transatlantic flight. It was named Point d'Interrogation ("The Question Mark"). Dieudonne Costes and Maurice Bellonte set a non-stop distance record of 7,905 km (4,912 mi) from Paris to Moullart on 27–29 September 1929 on this aircraft. Then on 1–2 September 1930, they flew from Paris to Curtis Field, New York City, a distance of 6,200 km (3,900 mi) making the second non-stop east-west crossing of the North Atlantic by a fixed-wing aircraft. The second Super Bidon, the Spanish Cuatro Vientos, vanished over Mexico with M. Barberan and J. Collar Serra, after a transatlantic flight from Seville to Cuba on 10–11 June 1933.

== Surviving aircraft ==
- Breguet Br.19 GR no.1685 Nungesser et Coli, in the Musée de l'Air et de l'Espace of Le Bourget, near Paris (not in public display as of 2009)
- CASA Br.19 TR Bidon Jesús del Gran Poder, in the Museo del Aire, Cuatro Vientos, Madrid
- Breguet Br.19 TF Super Bidon Point d'Interrogation, in the Musée de l'Air et de l'Espace (restored, on public display)

== Specifications (Br 19 A.2) ==
Data from The Encyclopedia of World Aircraft

General characteristics

- Crew: 2
- Length: 9.61 m (31 ft 6 in)
- Wingspan: 14.83 m (48 ft 8 in)
- Height: 3.69 m (12 ft 1 in)
- Wing area: 50 m^{2} (540 sq ft)
- Empty weight: 1,387 kg (3,058 lb)
- Max takeoff weight: 2,500 kg (5,512 lb)
- Fuel capacity: 365 L (80 imp gal; 96 US gal)
- Powerplant: 1 × Lorraine 12Ed Courlis W-12 liquid-cooled piston engine, 340 kW (450 hp)

Performance

- Maximum speed: 214 km/h (133 mph, 116 kn)
- Range: 800 km (500 mi, 430 nmi)
- Service ceiling: 7,200 m (23,600 ft)

Armament

- Guns: 1 × fixed, forward-firing 7.7 mm (0.30 in) Vickers machine gun, and two flexible, rearward-firing 7.7 mm (0.30 in) Lewis Guns.
- Bombs: Provision for light bombs.

== See also ==
- The Bréguet 19 played a central role in Nevil Shute's second published work So Disdained.

Related development

- Bréguet 280T

Aircraft of comparable role, configuration, and era

- Fairey Fox
- Polikarpov R-Z
- Potez 25

Related lists

- List of aircraft of the French Air Force during World War II
- List of aircraft of the Spanish Republican Air Force
- List of aircraft of World War II
- List of interwar military aircraft

== Bibliography ==
- Andersson, Lennart (July 1998). "Histoire de l'aéronautique persane, 1921–1941: La première aviation du Chah d'Iran" [History of the Persian Air Force, 1921–1941: The First Aircraft of the Shah of Iran]. Avions: Toute l'aéronautique et son histoire (in French). No. 76. pp. 2–12. ISSN 1243-8650.
- Andersson, Lennart (2008). A History of Chinese Aviation: Encyclopedia of Aircraft and Aviation in China to 1949. Taipei, Republic of China: AHS of ROC. ISBN 978-9572853337.
- Carr, John (2012). On spartan wings : the Royal Hellenic Air Force in World War Two. Barnsley: Pen & Sword Military. p. 17. ISBN 978-1848847989.
- Claveau, Charles (March–April 1997). "Les Avions Louis Breguet 1919–1945". Le Trait d'Union (in French). No. 172.
- Green, William; Swanborough, Gordon; Leyvastre, Pierre (July–September 1978). "The Saga of the Ubiquitous Breguet". Air Enthusiast. No. Seven. pp. 161–181.
- Hagedorn, Daniel P. (September–October 1996). "Talkback". Air Enthusiast. No. 65. p. 80. ISSN 0143-5450.
- Kotelnikov, V.; Kulikov, V. & Cony, C. (November 2001). "Les avions français en URSS, 1921–1941" [French Aircraft in the USSR, 1921–1941]. Avions: Toute l'Aéronautique et son histoire (in French). No. 104. pp. 37–43. ISSN 1243-8650.
- Wauthy, Jean-Luc & de Neve, Florian (June 1995). "Les aéronefs de la Force Aérienne Belge, deuxième partie 1919–1935" [Aircraft of the Belgian Air Force]. Le Fana de l'Aviation (in French). No. 305. pp. 28–33. ISSN 0757-4169.
