= Blériot 135 =

135
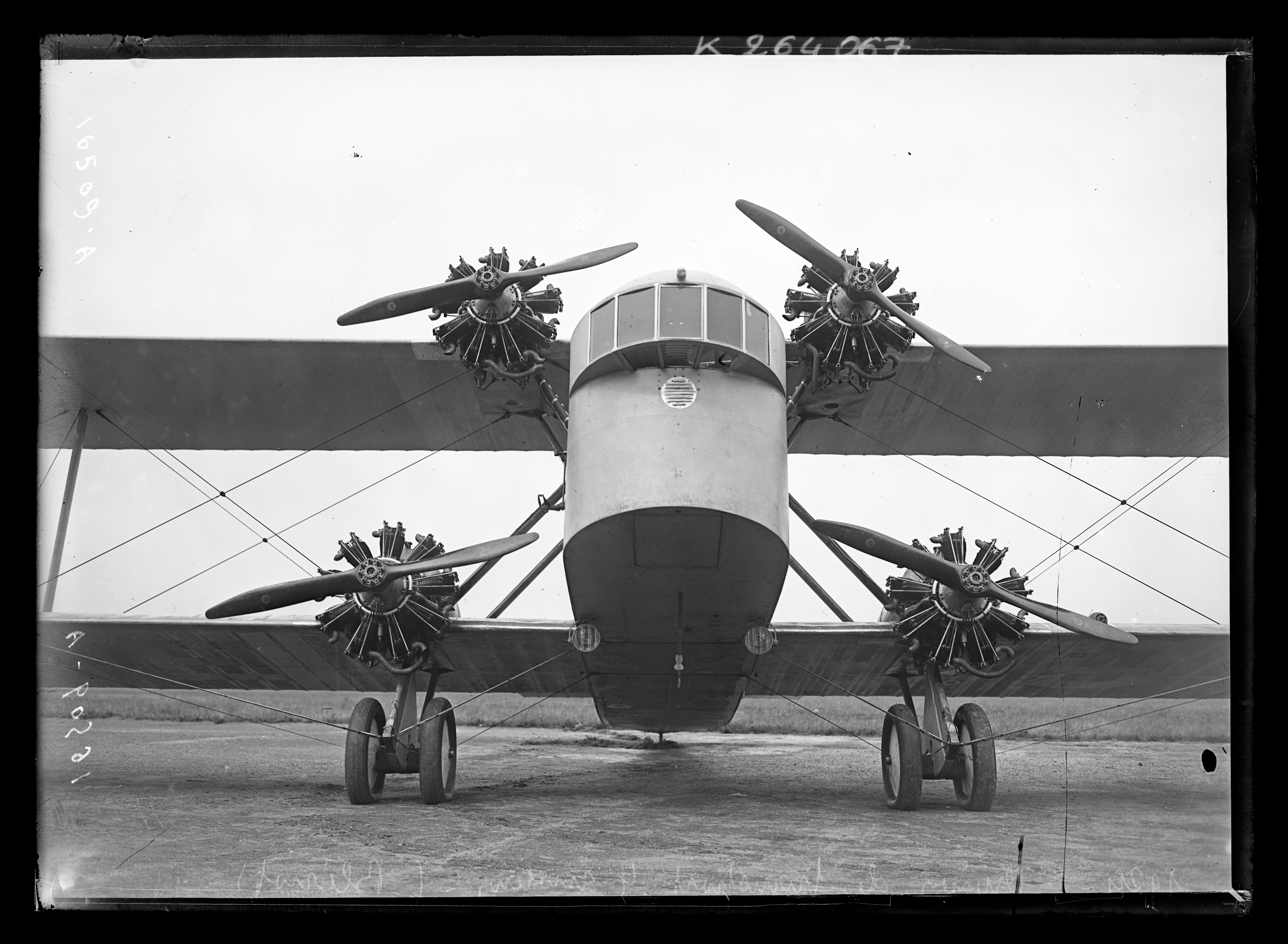
- Front view

General information
- Type: Airliner
- Manufacturer: Blériot
- Primary user: Air Union
- Number built: 2, including one conversion

History
- Introduction date: 1924
- First flight: 19 July 1924
- Developed from: Blériot 115
- Developed into: Blériot 155

The Blériot 135 (or Bl-135) was a French airliner of the 1920s, a development of the Blériot 115 with more powerful, radial engines. One of the two built was a converted 115, the other new. Both served with Air Union on their Paris–London route from mid-1924.

== Variants ==
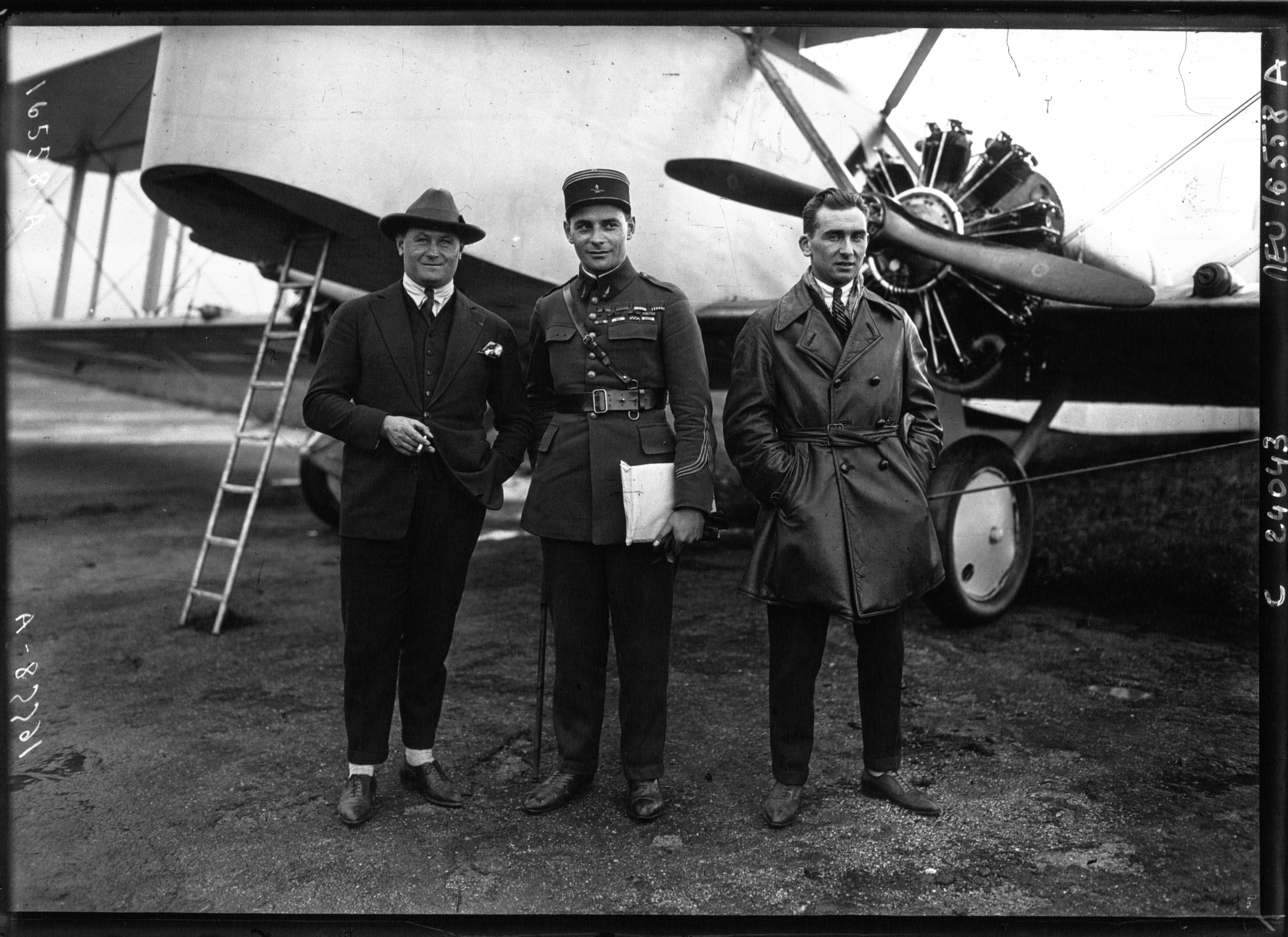
A Blériot 135 at Le Bourget airport in 1924.

Bleriot 135
Four-engined airliner.
Bleriot 136
Projected five-seat day-bomber version. Not built.

== Operators ==
France

- Air Union

== Specifications ==
General characteristics

- Crew: Two pilots and one radio operator
- Capacity: 8 passengers
- Length: 14.45 m (47 ft 5 in)
- Wingspan: 25.00 m (82 ft 0 in)
- Height: 4.96 m (16 ft 3 in)
- Wing area: 126.0 m^{2} (1,356 sq ft)
- Empty weight: 3,218 kg (7,094 lb)
- Gross weight: 5,300 kg (11,684 lb)
- Powerplant: 4 × Salmson 9Ab , 172 kW (230 hp) each

Performance

- Maximum speed: 190 km/h (118 mph, 103 kn)
- Range: 570 km (355 mi, 308 nmi)
- Service ceiling: 5,100 m (16,730 ft)
