= Bréguet 280T =

French airliner

280T
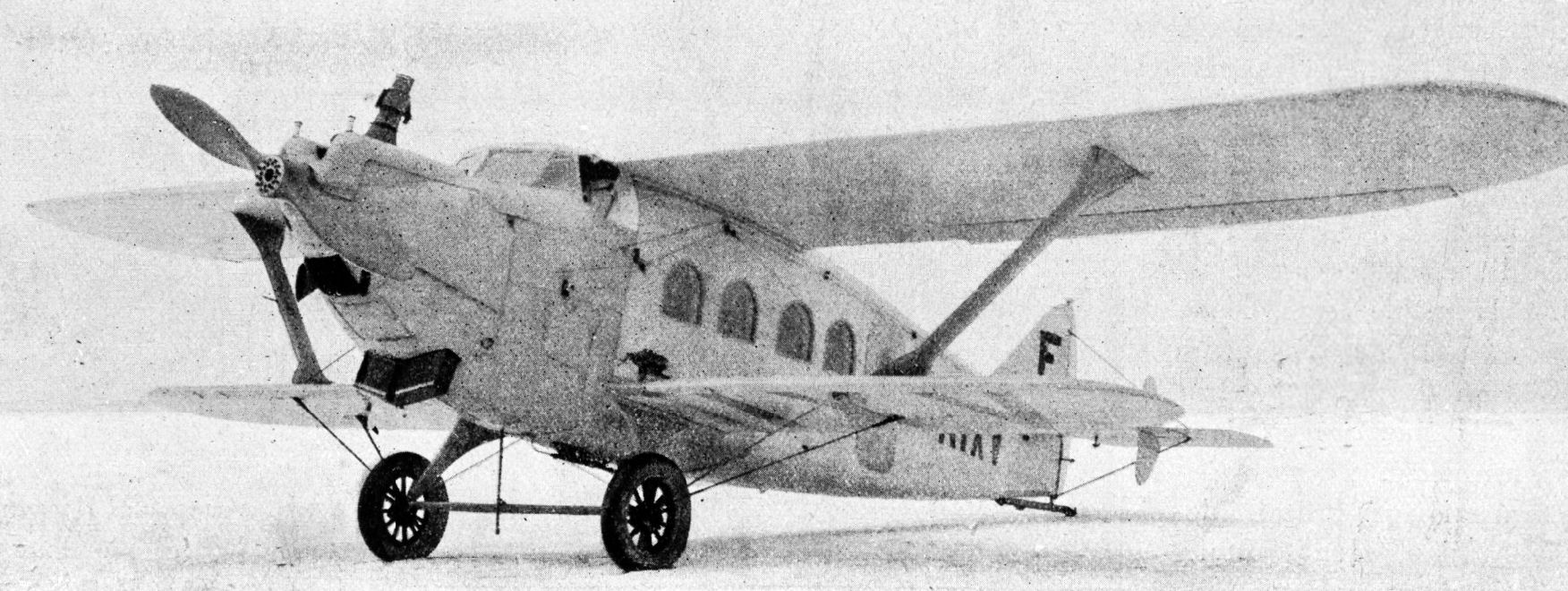

General information
- Type: Airliner
- Manufacturer: Bréguet
- Primary user: Air Union
- Number built: 19

History
- First flight: 1928

The Bréguet 280T was a French biplane airliner of the late 1920s, created by the manufacturer as a means of finding a civil market for their 19 warplane, as they had once tried before with the 26T.

== Development ==
The 280T was similar to the 26T, using the Bréguet 19's flying surfaces combined with a passenger-carrying fuselage that completely filled the interplane gap. The 280 fuselage was based on the 26T's fuselage but featured refined aerodynamics.

== Operational history ==
A single prototype was evaluated in autumn 1928, followed by eight production machines ordered by Air Union. These were flown on routes between Paris and southern France, between Paris and Switzerland, and (occasionally) between Paris and London. They were joined in service by a 10th machine (converted from one of the 281T prototypes), and six 284Ts with more powerful engines (one of these converted from the other 281T). Two of this latter type were also operated by Air Orient on routes to East Asia. Some of Air Union's 280Ts and 284Ts were still in service when the airline was absorbed into Air France.

== Accidents and incidents ==
On 17 January 1931, Bréguet 280T F-AIVU of Air Union crashed while attempting to land at Lympne Airport in England. The aircraft caught the boundary fence and crashed onto the airfield, damaging the forward fuselage and undercarriage. Of the eight people on board, one of the crew was injured.

== Variants ==
280T

- First main production version with a 370 kW (500 hp) Renault 12Jb engine, nine built.

281T

- Prototypes with 340 kW (450 hp) Lorraine-Dietrich 12Ed engines. Two aircraft built, one later converted to 280T, the other to 284T standard.

284T

- Second main production version with 450 kW (600 hp) Hispano-Suiza 12Lbrx engine, seven built.

== Operators ==
France

- Air Orient operated two Bréguet 284T aircraft.
- Air Union operated ten Bréguet 280T and five Bréguet 284T aircraft.
- Air France

== Specifications (280T) ==
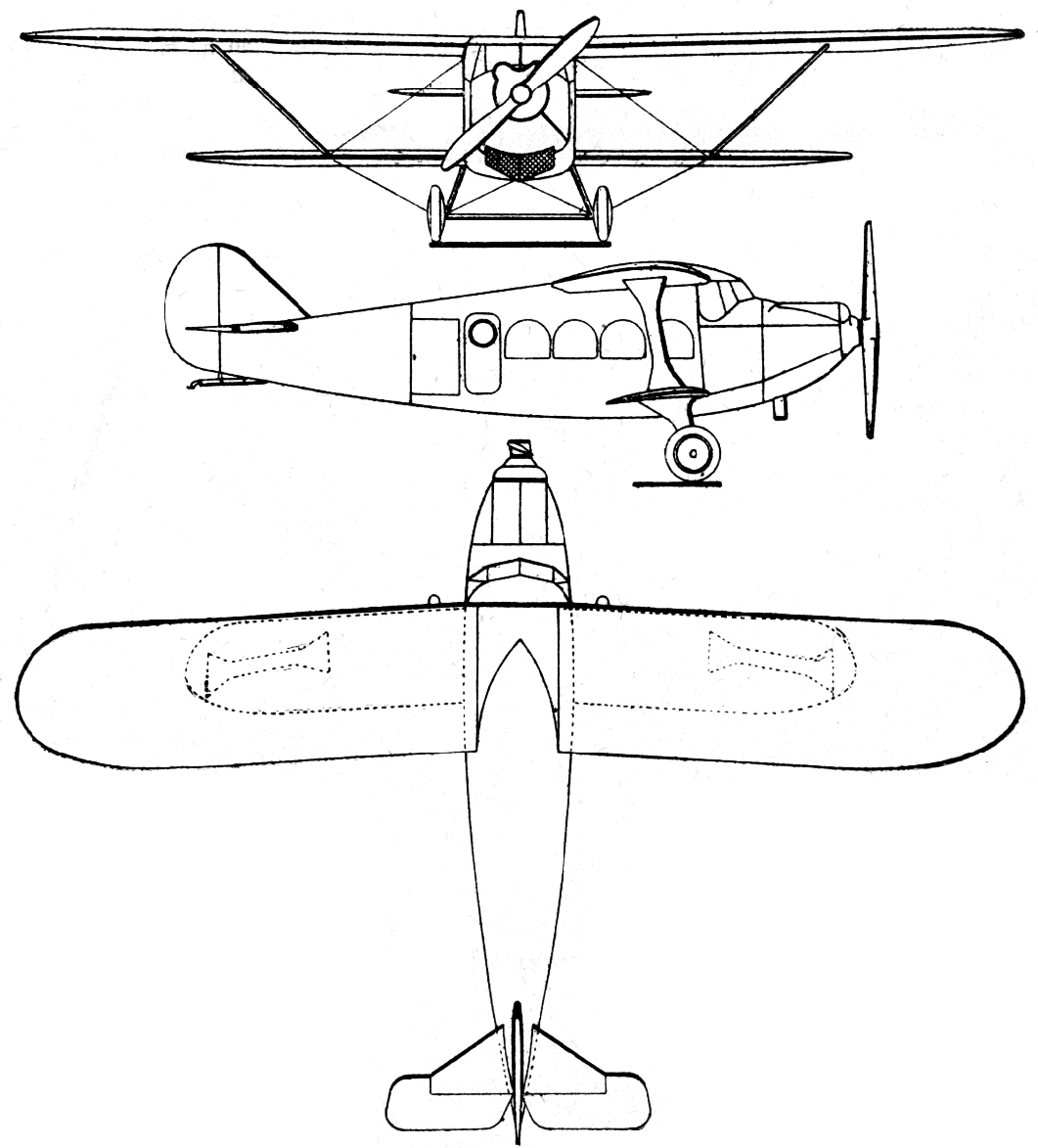
Bréguet 280T 3-view drawing from Les Ailes July 6, 1928

Data from Jane's all the World's Aircraft 1928

General characteristics

- Crew: 2
- Capacity: 8 / 10 pax
- Length: 12.125 m (39 ft 9 in)
- Wingspan: 17.25 m (56 ft 7 in)
- Height: 4.08 m (13 ft 5 in)
- Wing area: 55.85 m^{2} (601.2 sq ft)
- Empty weight: 1,607 kg (3,543 lb)
- Gross weight: 3,100 kg (6,834 lb)
- Fuel capacity: 640 L (170 US gal; 140 imp gal)
- Powerplant: 1 × Renault 12Jbr V-12 water-cooled piston engine, 370 kW (500 hp)

Performance

- Maximum speed: 200 km/h (120 mph, 110 kn)
- Minimum speed: 90 km/h (56 mph; 49 kn)
- Range: 1,100 km (680 mi, 590 nmi)
- Service ceiling: 4,700 m (15,400 ft)
- Time to altitude: 1,000 m (3,300 ft) in 6 minutes; 3,000 m (9,800 ft) in 29 minutes
- Wing loading: 55.5 kg/m^{2} (11.4 lb/sq ft)
- Power/mass: 0.1226 kW/kg (0.0746 hp/lb)
