= May 1923 Air Union Farman Goliath crash =

Aviation accident at Monsures, France

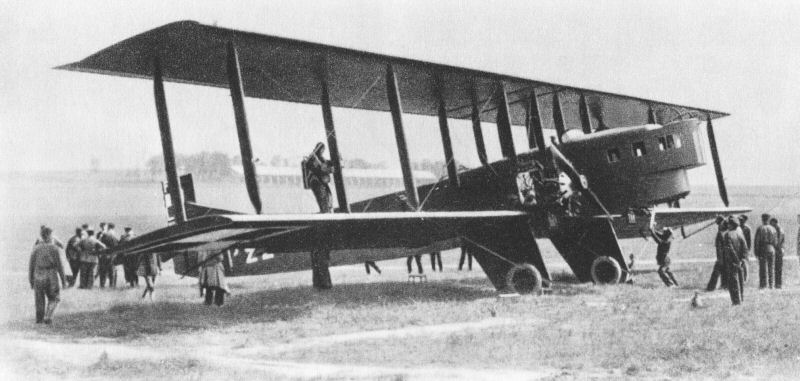
- A Farman Goliath, similar to the accident aircraft

Accident
- Date: 14 May 1923
- Summary: Structural failure
- Site: Monsures, Somme, France; 49°42′36″N 2°10′19″E

Aircraft
- Aircraft type: Farman F.60 Goliath
- Operator: Air Union
- Registration: F-AEBY
- Flight origin: Le Bourget, Paris, France
- Destination: Croydon, Surrey, United Kingdom
- Passengers: 4
- Crew: 2
- Fatalities: 6
- Survivors: 0

The May 1923 Air Union Farman Goliath crash occurred on 14 May 1923 when Farman F.60 Goliath F-AEBY of Air Union crashed at Monsures, Somme, France following the structural failure of a wing in flight. All six people on board were killed.

== Aircraft ==
The aircraft involved was Farman F.60 Goliath F-AEBY, c/n 3. The aircraft had entered service with Compagnie des Messageries Aériennes in April 1922, passing to Air Union in January 1923.

== Accident ==
The aircraft departed Le Bourget Airport, Paris at 12:35 local time with two crew and four passengers on board. At 13:42, the aircraft crashed at Monsures, Somme and burst into flames. A garde champêtre witnessed the aircraft flying at an altitude of 3,000 feet (910 m) when he saw what he described as "an explosion" in the air. The aircraft crashed and was consumed in the fire that followed. All six people on board were killed, including M. Émile Pierrot, the Technical Director of Air Union.

== Cause ==
The cause of the accident was the structural failure of a wing. One of the aircraft's wings was found at a distance of 200 yards (180 m) from the location of the main wreckage. One pair of wheels from the undercarriage was found near the railway line from Amiens to Beauvais, several hundred yards from the wreckage.

== Casualties ==
The nationalities of the victims were:-

Nationality	Crew	Passengers	Total
(France) French	2	1	3
(United States) American	–	2	2
(Finland) Finnish	–	1	1
Total	2	4	6
