= Marden Airfield =

Marden Airfield RAF Marden Pagehurst Emergency Landing Ground
- IATA: none; ICAO: none

Summary
- Airport type: Private/Military
- Serves: Marden / Staplehurst
- Location: Staplehurst, Kent
- Built: 1917
- In use: 1917–1935
- Elevation AMSL: 90 ft / 27 m
- Coordinates: 51°10′N 000°31′E

Map
- Location in Kent

Runways
Direction	Length		Surface
Direction	ft	m	Surface
E-W	2,100	640	Grass

Marden Airfield was an airfield in Marden, Kent, United Kingdom. It was operation from 1917 to 1935. Initially a Royal Flying Corps airfield during the First World War it was used post-war as an Emergency Landing Strip, RAF Marden by the Royal Air Force. It was also known as Pagehurst Emergency Landing Ground. Later serving as a civil Emergency Landing Ground, the airfield closed in 1935. The site housed a Royal Air Force transmitter station during the Second World War.

== Location ==
Marden Airfield was located east of Marden and west of Staplehurst, and south of the Ashford - Tonbridge railway line, in Ordnance Survey grid square TQ7643. (51°10′N 000°31′E), thus north east of Marden Thorn. Although known as Marden Airfield, most of the site lies within the parish of Staplehurst. The site is 90 ft (27 m) above sea level and was 900 by 350 yd (820 by 320 m).

== History ==
Marden Airfield was established in January 1917. It was a Second Class Landing Ground. Facilities were limited to a Bessonneau hangar located in the south east corner of the airfield. It was used as an Emergency Landing Ground. One example of such use was on 16 March 1917 when a Royal Aircraft Factory BE2c of 50 Squadron Royal Flying Corps landed at Marden following engine trouble. In 1918, pilots of 141 Squadron, Royal Air Force, who were taking part in ground-to-air radio telephony exercises were in the habit of making "precautionary" landings at RAF Marden. The pilots did this in order to enjoy the food served at the Station Hotel, Staplehurst. This practice continued until the Commanding Officer of 49 Wing had a genuine problem and landed at Marden. On seeing six Bristol fighters lined up, he made enquiries and discovered the truth. The practice was stopped.

Marden was still in use by the RAF in 1919, when Group Captain Charles Eaton landed on 4 July at Marden in Airco DH.4 F5759 following engine trouble. Eaton was returning from Paris where he had been attending the Versailles Peace Conference. After repairs had been made, Eaton departed for RAF Kenley, but his engine failed near Godstone, Surrey where the aircraft crash-landed and was written off.

In civil use, the longest available runway was 2,100 ft (640 m) long. The western part of the airfield was separated from the main landing ground by a ditch, which was bridged over a 100 ft (30 m) length to allow access for aircraft. The Bessonneau hangar had been removed by the RAF. A windsock was located in the north eastern corner of the airfield. The airfield was identified by a circle of whitewashed stones 60 ft (18 m) diameter with the word MARDEN spelled out in the centre. It was lit at night. Telegraph wires at a height of 25 ft (7.6 m) were an obstacle at the west end of the airfield. A navigational beacon was installed at Marden. It was powered by clockwork and had to be wound daily. Lighting at Marden progressed from Chance lights to Gooseneck flares and Money flares over the years. In the latter years of operation, night landing was possible by giving four hours notice to Lympne Airport not later than 4pm.

Marden remained in use as a civil Emergency Landing Ground. On 27 October 1919, a Handley Page O/400 of Handley Page Transport landed at Marden due to strong winds preventing it reaching Croydon. On 13 August 1923, de Havilland DH.34 G-EBBW of Instone Air Line landed at Marden due to a broken oil pipe. The aircraft was repaired and returned to Croydon. One Wednesday in September 1927, an Air Union aircraft on a flight from Paris to Croydon landed at Marden due to engine trouble. Another aircraft was sent from Croydon to collect the 11 passengers and take them to their destination. Marden was still in operation in 1934, when it was mentioned in Kelly's Directory for Kent. In August 1934, a de Havilland Leopard Moth on a flight from Heston to St Inglevert, France made a landing at Marden as a child passenger was suffering from airsickness. The flight was resumed after the child had recovered. Marden closed on 24 June 1935, and the land then reverted to farmland. A RAF wireless station was based on the site during the Second World War. The last aircraft to land at Marden was on 10 October 1940, during the Battle of Britain, when a Hawker Hurricane of 253 Squadron made a forced landing and overturned, the pilot escaping with a cut thumb.

Marden Airfield was active again from the mid-1980s until 1998 and was home to a small collection of vintage De Havilland aeroplanes owned by Roger Twisleton-Wykeham-Fiennes who lived at Great Pagehurst on a site adjacent the former Marden Airfield. Due to hangarage space he rotated his collection between Marden and Headcorn Aerodrome; Fiennes collection of aeroplanes included: De Havilland DH.82 Tiger Moth G-BALX; De Havilland DH.83 Fox Moth G-ACDD (ZK-AEK, C-FYPM); De Havilland DH.87 Hornet Moth G-ADNE; Jodel D.140 Mousquetaire G-TOAD.

Roger Fiennes disappeared over the English Channel on 19 April 1998 while flying from Dieppe to Headcorn Aerodrome. Neither Fiennes nor the wreckage of his Tiger Moth G-BALX were ever found, following his disappearance all flying at Marden Airfield ceased.

== Civil accidents and incidents ==
- On 2 February 1930, Farman F.63 Goliath F-FHMY of Air Union crashed whilst attempting an emergency landing at Marden following structural failure of the starboard tailplane. Two of the six people on board were killed.
- On 23 April 1931, Farman F.60 Goliath F-ADDT Languedoc of Air Union crashed at Widehurst Farm, Marden (TQ 756 429, 51°09′32″N 000°30′38″E) after taking off from Marden. The aircraft was carrying mail.
- During the 1930s, a French-registered biplane crashed near Widehurst Wood after hitting a hedge whilst attempting to land at Marden. It was carrying a cargo of oysters.
- During a fly-in at Marden Airfield on 16 August 1991 a De Havilland DH.82 Tiger Moth D-EEAJ crashed into power lines while attempting to land and was badly damaged.
