= Air Union =

1923–1933 airline in France

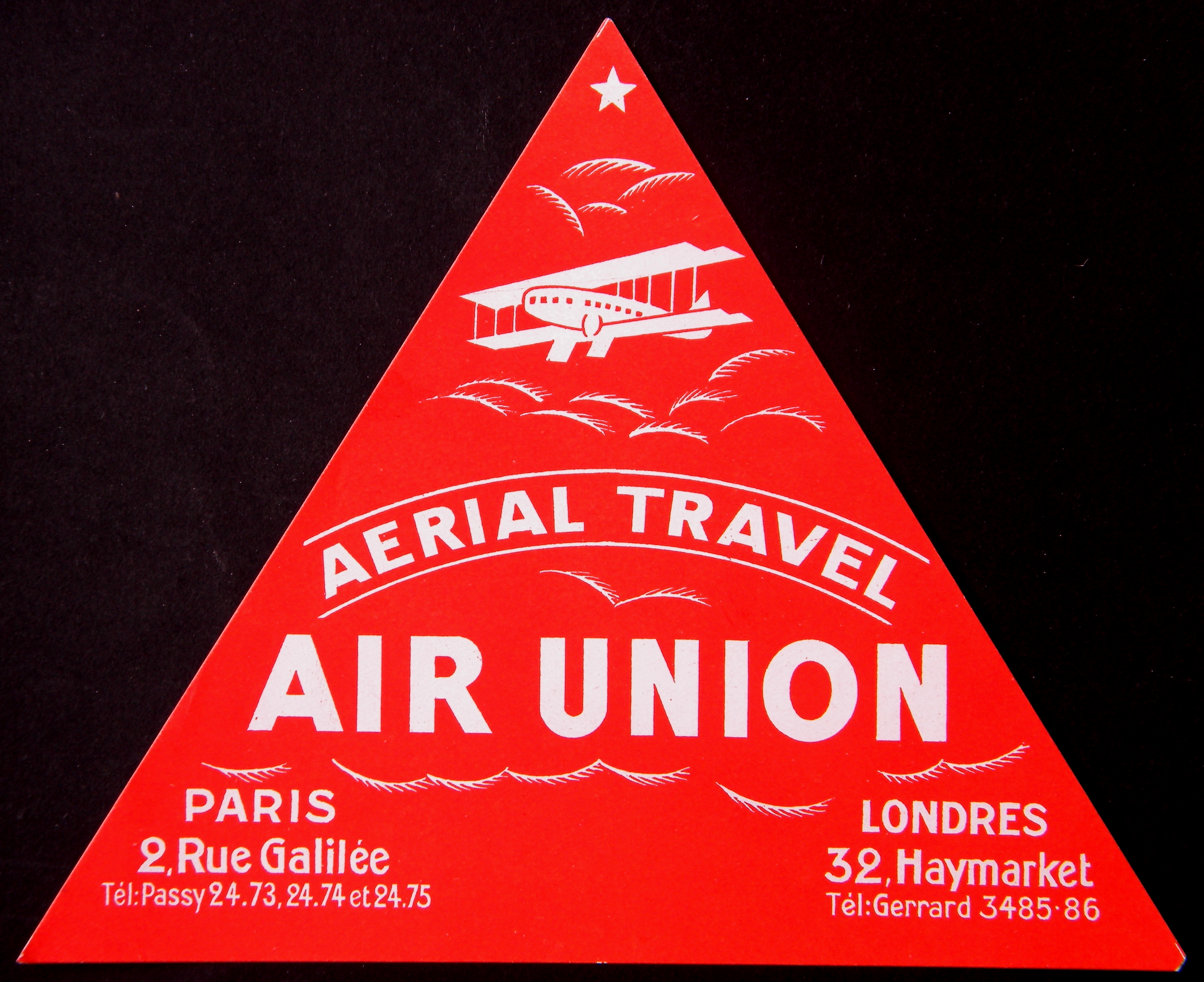
- Founded: 1 January 1923; Paris, France
- Commenced operations: 1 January 1923; Paris, France
- Ceased operations: 7 October 1933(merged with Air Orient, Aéropostale, CFRNA and SGTA to form Air France)
- Operating bases: Paris–Le Bourget Airport
- Destinations: Croydon
- Headquarters: Le Bourget Airport

Air Union was a French airline established on 1 January 1923, as the result of a merger between the airlines Compagnie des Messageries Aériennes and Compagnie des Grands Express Aériens. Air Union was merged with four other French airlines to become Air France on 7 October 1933.

== Fleet ==
Aircraft	Total	Introduced	Retired	Notes
Blériot 135	2	1924		
Blériot 155	2	1926	1926	Both lost in 1926
Blériot 165	2			
Blériot-SPAD S.27	10	1923		ex CMA
Blériot-SPAD S.33	9	1923		ex CMA
Blériot-SPAD S.56	6			
Bréguet 14T	6			ex CMA
Bréguet 280T	10	1928	1933	Transferred to Air France
Farman F.50P				
Farman F.60 Goliath	16	1923		ex CMA, CGTA, and CGEA
Farman F.61	3			ex CMA
Farman F.190				
FBA 19	1	1925		
Lioré et Olivier LeO 21				
Salmson 2	2			ex CMA
Wibault 282	6	1933	1933	Transferred to Air France

== Accidents and incidents ==
- On 7 May 1923, Farman F.60 Goliath F-AEGP Flandre was damaged in a forced landing at Lympne, Kent. The aircraft was repaired and returned to service.
- On 14 May 1923, Goliath F-AEBY crashed at Monsures, Somme, killing all six people on board. The aircraft was on a scheduled international passenger flight from Paris to Croydon
- On 27 August 1923, Farman F.60 Goliath F-AECB crashed at East Malling, Kent. The aircraft was operating an international scheduled passenger flight from Paris to Croydon. A precautionary landing was made at Lympne due to weather, following which the flight was resumed. One engine later failed and the aircraft crashed following misunderstanding of an instruction for a number of passengers to move towards the rear of the aircraft, affecting the centre of gravity and causing the aircraft to enter a spin.
- On 3 December 1923, Goliath F-AEIF force-landed at Littlestone-on-Sea, Kent following technical failure; all on board survived, but the aircraft, operating a flight from Paris to Croydon, was written off.
- On 22 January 1924, Goliath F-GEAO was destroyed by fire following an accident when landing at Croydon.
- On 6 August 1924, Farman F.60 Goliath F-ADDT Languedoc was on a scheduled international passenger flight from Paris to Croydon when the port engine failed. A forced landing was made at Golden Green, Kent. One person amongst the pilot and five passengers on board was injured. The aircraft was dismantled to allow removal. It was later repaired and returned to service.
- On 8 February 1925, a Farman Goliath crashed whilst attempting to land at Lympne. The aircraft was on a cargo flight from Paris to Croydon when an engine failed over the Channel.
- On 16 October 1925, Goliath F-HMFU Île de France of Air Union crashed at Wadhurst, East Sussex. Three passengers were killed and two were injured. The aircraft may have been repaired and returned to service as its registration was not cancelled until 1 June 1932. Its fuselage is preserved at the Musée de l'Air et de l'Espace, Paris.
- On 14 November 1925, Farman F.60 Goliath F-FHMY ditched in the English Channel 7 1/2 miles (12.1 km) off Boulogne. The badly damaged aircraft was salvaged and rebuilt as an F.63, returning to service in 1929, but was written off after a 1930 crash.
- On 31 May 1926, Bréguet 14T bis F-ADAI disappeared over the English Channel during a Paris-Croydon mail flight. Neither the aircraft nor the pilot have been found.
- On 18 August 1926, Blériot 155 F-AIEB Wilbur Wright crashed 2 miles (3.2 km) south of Lympne Airport, Kent, killing two crew and two passengers.
- On 2 October 1926, Blériot 155 F-AICQ Clement Ader crashed at Leigh, Kent following an in-flight fire. Both crew and all five passengers were killed.
- On 10 March 1927, Goliath F-AEGP of Air Union made a forced landing near Tonbridge, Kent following an engine failure.
- On 24 November 1927, Goliath F-GEAB of Air Union was severely damaged in a forced landing at Yaldham Manor, Wrotham, Kent. The aircraft was later repaired and returned to service.
- On 6 March 1928, Goliath F-AECU Normandie of Air Union crashed at Hythe, Kent. The aircraft may have been repaired and returned to service as its registration was not cancelled until 1 June 1932.
- On 11 March 1928, Goliath F-AEFC crashed into the English Channel whilst operating an international scheduled passenger flight from Paris to Croydon. The aircraft had landed at Saint-Inglevert to await an improvement in the weather before continuing its journey. and the passenger (or passengers) had decided to continue the journey by boat. The aircraft broadcast a Mayday before it crashed into the sea killing both crew. The bodies of the victims were picked up by the Southern Railway's ferry Maid of Orleans.
- On 19 May 1929 Farman F.63bis Goliath F-GEAI, on a flight from Croydon to Paris crashed at Keylands Sidings near Paddock Wood railway station, it stopped yards from the signal box and was destroyed by fire, the pilot and mechanic escaped with minor injuries.
- On 31 July 1929, Goliath F-GEAB of Air Union, on a flight from London to Paris carrying gold bullion was damaged in a forced landing near Smarden in Kent, bushes on the riverbank stopped the aircraft entering the River Beult although some of the gold bullion it was carrying ended up in the river, the bullion was recovered by spectators and transferred by lorry to Lympne for onward transport to Paris. The aircraft may have been repaired and returned to service as its registration was not cancelled until 1 June 1932.
- On 15 November 1929, Lioré et Olivier LeO H-190 F-AIGB disappeared off Cape Zivia in fog with three on board; the wreckage has never been found. The aircraft was operating a flight from Marseille to Tunis.
- On 10 February 1930, Farman F.63 Goliath F-FHMY crashed at Marden Airfield, Kent following structural failure of the starboard elevator. Two passengers killed of the six people on board.
- On 1 May 1930, Farman F.63 Goliath F-ADCA crashed at Penshurst, Kent after encountering a heavy squall whilst on a flight form Le Bourget to Croydon.
- On 25 July 1930, Lioré et Olivier LeO 21 F-AIZO Golden Ray/Rayan d'Or made a forced landing at Snave, Kent following an engine failure. The aircraft was dismantled and removed to Hythe, Kent.
- On 17 January 1931, Bréguet 280T F-AIVU crashed whilst attempting to land at Lympne. The aircraft caught the boundary fence and crashed onto the airfield, damaging the forward fuselage and undercarriage. Of the eight people on board, one of the crew was injured.
- On 23 April 1931, Farman F.60 Goliath F-ADDT Languedoc of Air Union crashed at Widehurst Farm, Marden after taking off from Marden. The aircraft was carrying mail.
- 17 September 1932, Lioré et Olivier 213 F-AIFE struck a tree in poor visibility and crashed at Selsdon Park, United Kingdom while on approach to Croydon Airport, killing the pilot; the co-pilot survived.
