= Farman F.60 Goliath =

French airliner and bomber

F.60 Goliath
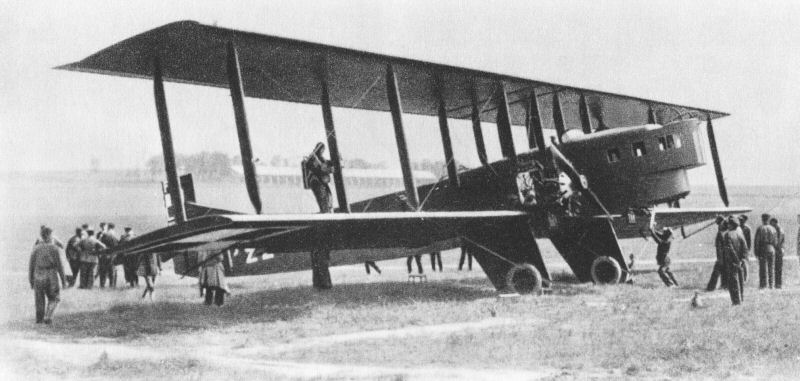
- Farman F-68BN4 Goliath of the Polish Air Force

General information
- Type: Airliner
- National origin: France
- Manufacturer: Farman Aviation Works
- Number built: Approx. 60

History
- Introduction date: February 1919
- First flight: January 1919
- Retired: c. 1931

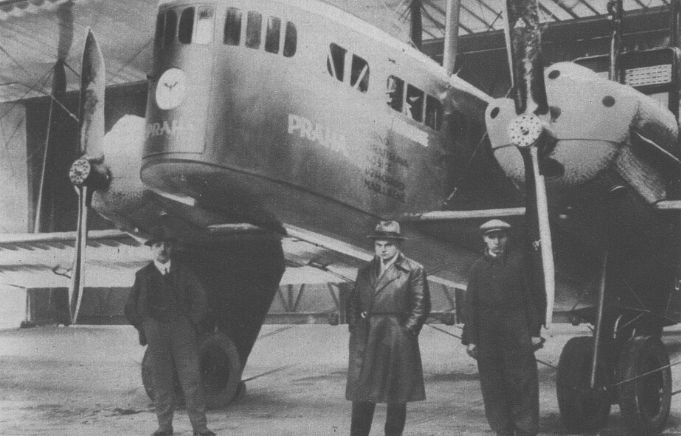
Farman Goliath of the CSA 1929

The Farman F.60 Goliath was a French airliner and bomber produced by the Farman Aviation Works from 1919. It was instrumental in the creation of early airlines and commercial routes in Europe after World War I.

== Design and development ==
The Goliath was initially designed in 1918 as a heavy bomber capable of carrying 1,000 kg (2,205 lb) of bombs with a range of 1,500 km (932 mi). It was a fixed-undercarriage three-bay biplane of fabric-covered wood construction, powered by two Salmson 9Z engines. It had a simple and robust, yet light structure. The wings were rectangular with a constant profile with aerodynamically balanced ailerons fitted to both the upper and lower wings.

It was undergoing initial testing when World War I came to an end on 11 November 1918, and Farman realized there would be no orders for his bomber design. Nonetheless he was quick to understand that the big, box-like fuselage of the Goliath could be easily modified to convert the aircraft into an airliner. Commercial aviation was beginning to develop and was in need of purpose-built aircraft. With the new passenger cabin arrangement, the Goliath could carry up to 12 or 14 passengers. It had large windows to give the passengers a view of the surroundings. The Salmson engines could be replaced by other types (Renault, Lorraine) if a customer desired it. Approximately 60 F.60 Goliaths were built. Between 1927 and 1929, eight Goliaths with various engines were built under licence in Czechoslovakia, four by Avia and four by Letov.

== Operational history ==
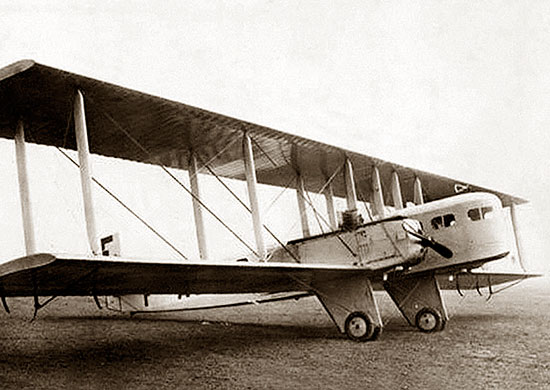
Airplane "Farman Goliath"

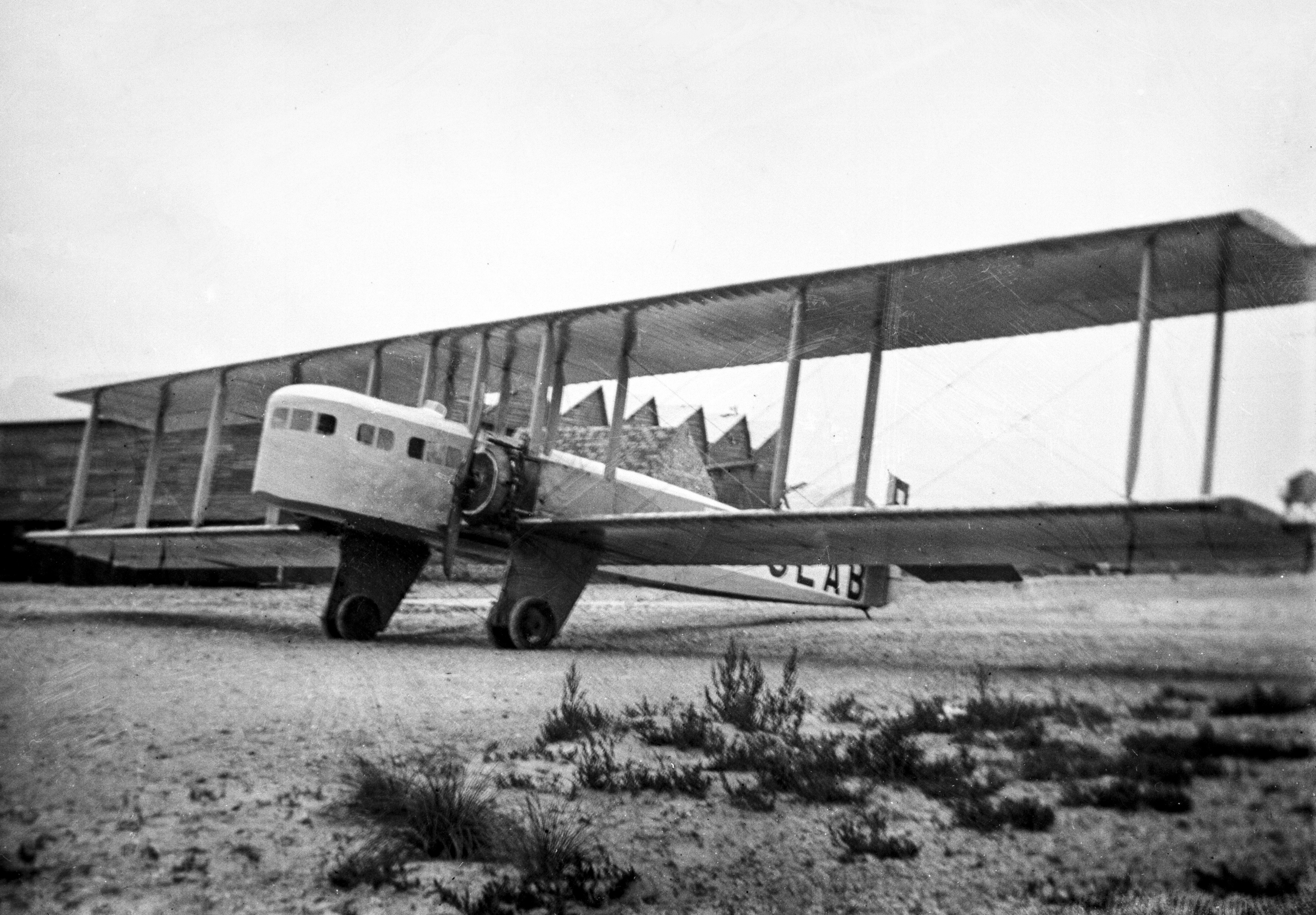
Goliath, London–Paris with engine failure, Le Crotoy 1921

Farman was quick to press the Goliath into service and made several publicity flights. On 8 February 1919, the Goliath flew 12 passengers from Toussus-le-Noble to RAF Kenley, near Croydon in 2 hours and 30 minutes. Since non-military flying was not permitted at that date, Lucien Bossoutrot and his passengers were all ex-military pilots who wore uniforms and carried mission orders for the circumstances. The pilot and passengers were well received in England. The return flight the following day took 2 hours and 10 minutes.

In another publicity flight, on 3 April 1919, a Goliath with 14 passengers reached an altitude of 6,200 m (20,341 ft). On 11 August 1919, an F.60 flew eight passengers and a ton of supplies from Paris via Casablanca and Mogador to Koufa, 180 km (112 mi) north of Saint-Louis, Senegal, flying more than 4,500 km (2,800 mi).

Many early European airlines used the F.60. In 1920, the Compagnie des Grands Express Aériens (CGEA) began scheduling regular flights between Le Bourget and Croydon. The Compagnie des Messageries Aériennes (CMA) soon followed suit. The Société Générale de Transports Aériens (SGTA) opened a Paris-Brussels route in July 1920, flown by the Goliath. In May 1921, this route was extended to Amsterdam. The Belgian airline Société Nationale pour l'Etude des Transports Aériens (SNETA) also opened a Brussels-London route in April 1921.

== Variants ==
FF.60
Designation of the first three prototypes.

F.60
Civil passenger transport version, powered by two 190 kW (260 hp) Salmson CM.9 radial piston engines, sixty built.

F.60bis
This designation was given to the transport version, powered by two 220 kW (300 hp) Salmson 9Az engines.

F.60 Bn.2
Three-seat night bomber evolved from the F.60 Goliath. It was equipped with two 190 kW (260 hp) Salmson 9Zm engines, and 210 were delivered to French naval and army aviation.

F.60 Torp
Torpedo-bomber floatplane, powered by two Gnome-Rhône 9A Jupiter radial piston engines.

F.60M
Blunt-nose version in 1924, powered by two 230 kW (310 hp) Renault 12Fcy engines.

F.61
Two aircraft equipped with two 220 kW (300 hp) Renault 12Fe engines.

F.62
A record-breaking aircraft, derived from the F.60, powered by a single 370 kW (500 hp) Farman 12We. First flown on 7 August 1925, the F.62, piloted by Landry and Drouhin, broke the world record 4,400 km (2,700 mi; 2,400 nmi) closed-circuit in 45 hours 11 minutes and 59 seconds.

F.62 BN.4
Export version for the Soviet Union, powered by two 340 kW (450 hp) Lorraine-Dietrich V-12 engines.

F.62 BN.5
A 5-seat night bomber version, powered by 2x 300 kW (400 hp) Lorraine 12Db engines.

F.63 BN.4
Similar to the F.62 BN.4 export version, powered by two 340 kW (450 hp) Gnome-Rhône 9A Jupiter radial piston engines, 42 built for the Aéronautique militaire francaise.

F.63bis

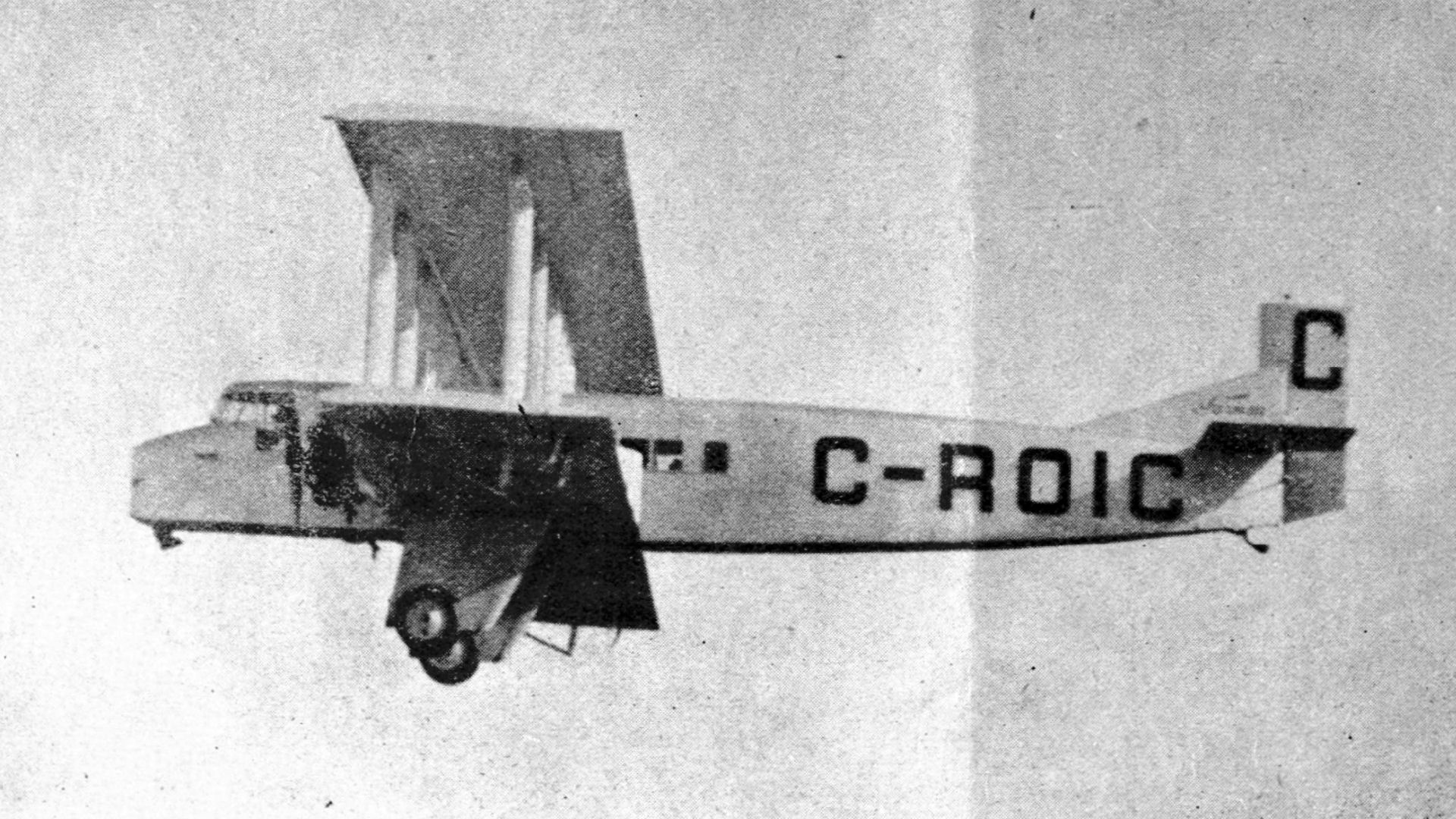
Farman F.63bis photo from L'Air 15 December 1928

A single airliner, powered by 2x 272 kW (365 hp) Armstrong Siddeley Jaguar IIIA engines. Ten more were built powered by 2x 280 kW (380 hp) Gnome-Rhône 9Aa Jupiter engines.

F.63ter
Three airliners, powered by 2x 280 kW (380 hp) Gnome-Rhône 9Aa Jupiter engines.

F.65

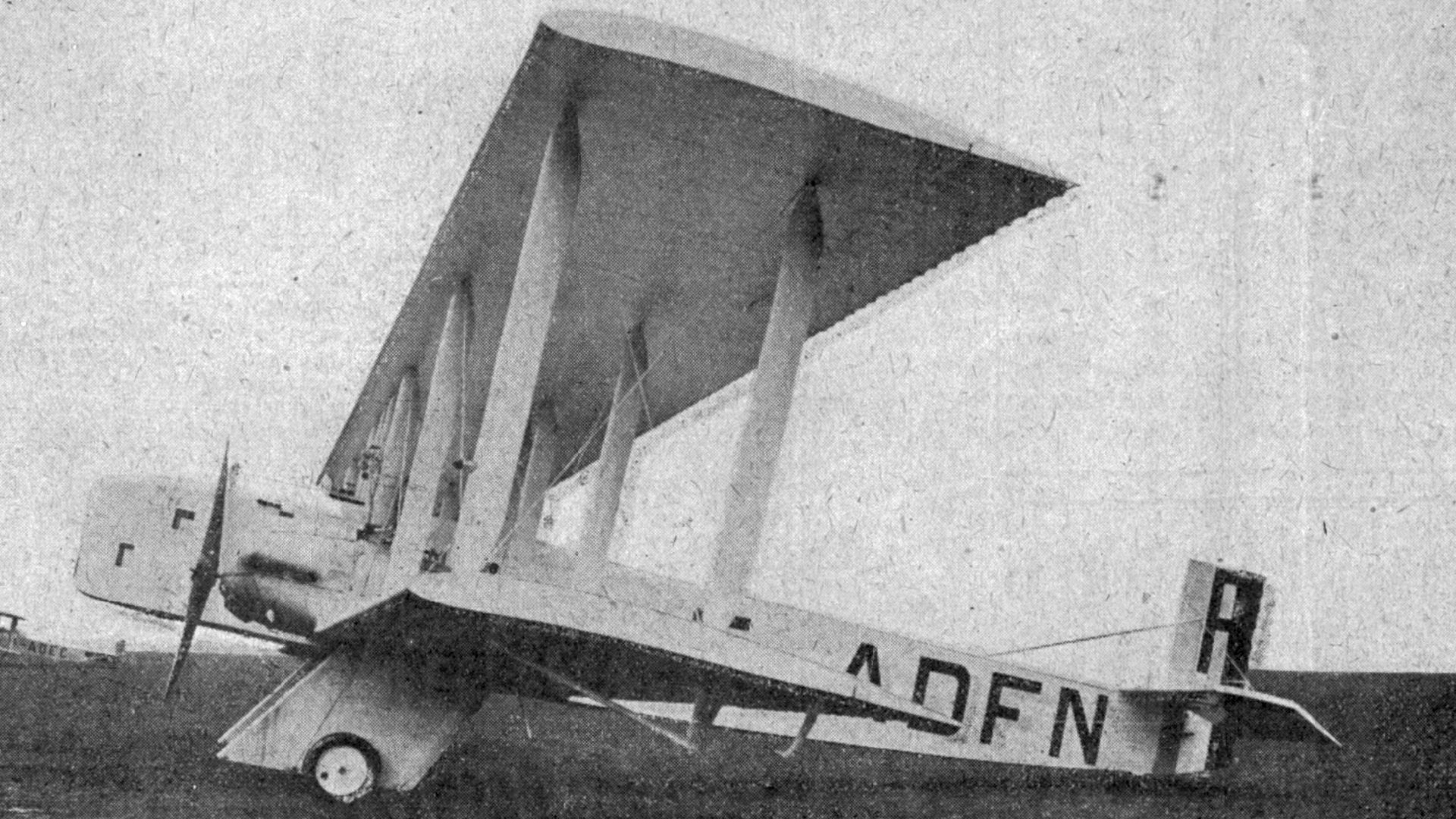
Farman F.65 Goliath photo from Les Ailes 21 April 1927

Sixty floatplane torpedo-bombers built for the Aéronautique navale, fitted with interchangeable float or landing gear and powered by 2x 280 kW (380 hp) Gnome-Rhône 9Aa Jupiter engines.

F.66
Two torpedo-bombers built for the Aéronautique navale, powered by 2x 190 kW (260 hp) Salmson CM.9 engines.

F.66 BN.3
One Gnome-Rhône 9A Jupiter-powered aircraft was built, intended to be exported to Romania.

F.68 BN.4
Thirty-two bomber aircraft, powered by 2x 310 kW (420 hp) Gnome-Rhône 9Ab Jupiter, exported to Poland.

F.140 Super Goliath
Super-heavy bomber prototype, powered by four 370 kW (500 hp) Farman 12We W-12 engines in tandem pairs.

== Operators ==
=== Civilian operators ===
Belgium

- Sociéte Anonyme Belge pour l'Exploitation de la Navigation Aérienne (SABENA).
- Société Colombophile de Transport Aériens (SOCTA).
- Syndicat National pour l'Etude des Transports Aériens (SNETA).

Colombia

- Compañía Colombiana de Navegación Aérea (CCNA)

Czechoslovakia

- Československé státní aerolinie (ČSA).

France

- Air Union.
- Compagnie Aérienne Française (CAF).
- Compagnie des Grands Express Aériens (CGEA).
- Compagnie des Messageries Aériennes (CMA).
- Enterprise de la Photo-Aérienne.
- Farman Airlines (Société Générale des Transports Aériens, SGTA).

Romania

- Liniile Aeriene Române Exploatate de Stat (LARES).

=== Military operators ===
Belgium

- Belgian Air Force

Czechoslovakia

- Czechoslovak Air Force

France

- French Air Force
- French Navy
  - Commission d'Etudes Pratiques d'Aéronautique (CEPA).
  - Escadrille 2R1.
  - Escadrille 5B2.

Italy
Japan
Peru

- Peruvian Air Force
- Peruvian Navy

Poland

- Polish Air Force
  - 211 Squadron.
  - 212 Squadron.

Soviet Union

- Soviet Air Force (4 bought in 1924)

Spain

- Aeronáutica Militar, used in air raids over Morocco.

== Accidents and incidents ==
26 August 1921
Farman F.60 Goliath O-BLAN of SNETA ditched into the English Channel whilst on a flight from Brussels-Evere Airport to Croydon Airport, Surrey, United Kingdom with the bodies of both pilots not found. The aircraft was salvaged and rebuilt as an F.61.

27 September 1921
Two Farman F.60 Goliaths, O-BLEU and O-BRUN, both of SNETA, were destroyed in a hangar fire at Brussels-Evere Airport.

8 October 1921
A Farman Goliath of Compagnie des Grands Express Aériens (CGEA) made an emergency landing at Saint-Inglevert, Pas-de-Calais due to problems with a propeller shortly after the aircraft had crossed the French coast. The aircraft was operating an international scheduled passenger flight from Le Bourget Airport, Paris to Croydon. Another aircraft was dispatched from Paris to take the six passengers on to Croydon.

30 November 1921
Farman F.60 Goliath F-GEAD of CGEA was damaged in a forced landing at Smeeth, Kent. The aircraft was repaired and returned to service.

11 February 1922
Farman F.60 Goliath F-GEAI of CGEA was damaged in a forced landing at Farnborough, Kent. The aircraft was repaired and returned to service.

7 April 1922
Farman F.60 Goliath F-GEAD of CGEA was in a mid-air collision with de Havilland DH.18A G-EAWO of Daimler Airway over Thieuloy-Saint-Antoine, Oise, France. All seven people on board both aircraft were killed.

1 September 1922
A Farman F.60 Goliath on a flight from Croydon Airport to Paris, suffered a severely damaged propeller after flying through torrential rain whilst crossing the English Channel. The engine was shut down and a precautionary landing was made at Saint-Inglevert where the propeller was changed in 15 minutes. The aircraft then departed for Le Bourget, arriving only 12 minutes later than scheduled.

15 March 1923
Farman F.61 Goliath F-AEIE (former O-BLAN) of Compagnie des Messageries Aériennes (CMA) overran the runway on landing at Croydon and collided with a building. The aircraft was later repaired and returned to service.

7 May 1923
Farman F.60 Goliath F-AEGP Flandre of Air Union was damaged in a forced landing at Lympne, Kent. The aircraft was repaired and returned to service.

14 May 1923
Farman F.60 Goliath F-AEBY of Air Union crashed at Monsures, Somme, following structural failure of a wing. All six people on board were killed. The aircraft was on a scheduled international passenger flight from Paris to Croydon

15 July 1923
Farman F.60 Goliath F-AEEE of Farman crashed near Valenciennes, France.

27 August 1923
Farman F.60 Goliath (former F.61) F-AECB of Air Union crashed at East Malling, Kent. The aircraft was operating an international scheduled passenger flight from Paris to Croydon. A precautionary landing was made at Lympne due to weather, following which the flight was resumed. One engine later failed and the aircraft crashed following misunderstanding of an instruction for a number of passengers to move towards the rear of the aircraft, affecting the centre of gravity and causing the aircraft to enter a spin. One passenger died.

3 December 1923
Farman F.60 Goliath F-AEIF, possibly operated by CMA, crashed at Littlestone, Kent.

22 January 1924
Farman F.60 Goliath F-GEAO of Air Union was destroyed by fire following an accident when landing at Croydon.

6 August 1924
Farman F.60 Goliath F-ADDT Languedoc of Air Union was on a scheduled international passenger flight from Paris to Croydon when the port engine failed. A forced landing was made at Golden Green, Kent. One person amongst the pilot and five passengers on board was injured. The aircraft was dismantled to allow removal. It was later repaired and returned to service.

8 February 1925
Farman F.60 Goliath F-GEAB Savoie of Air Union crashed whilst attempting to land at Lympne. The aircraft was on a cargo flight from Paris to Croydon when an engine failed over the Channel. The aircraft was later repaired and returned to service.

16 October 1925
Farman F.60 Goliath F-HMFU Île de France of Air Union crashed at Wadhurst, East Sussex. Three passengers were killed and two were injured. The aircraft may have been repaired and returned to service as its registration was not cancelled until 1 June 1932. Its fuselage is preserved.

14 November 1925
Farman F.60 Goliath F-FHMY Picardie of Air Union ditched in the English Channel 12 kilometres (7.5 mi) off Boulogne, France. The aircraft was salvaged and rebuilt as an F.63bis, returning to service in 1929.

10 March 1927
Farman F.63bis Goliath F-AEGP Flandre of Air Union made a forced landing near Tonbridge, Kent following an engine failure.

5 May 1927
Farman F.61 Goliath F-ADFN of Société Générale des Transports Aériens was lost in the Atlantic Ocean on a flight from Saint-Louis Senegal to Pernambuco, Brazil. Both crew were killed.

24 November 1927
Farman F.60 Goliath F-GEAB Savoie of Air Union was severely damaged in a forced landing at Yaldham Manor, Wrotham, Kent. The aircraft was later repaired and returned to service.

6 March 1928
Farman F.60 Goliath (former F.61) F-AECU Normandie of Air Union crashed at Hythe, Kent. The aircraft may have been repaired and returned to service as its registration was not cancelled until 1 June 1932.

11 March 1928
Farman F.60 Goliath (former F.61) F-AEFC Provence of Air Union crashed into the English Channel 9 miles (14 km) off Folkestone whilst operating an international scheduled passenger flight from Paris to Croydon. The aircraft had landed at Saint-Inglevert to await an improvement in the weather before continuing its journey, and the passenger (or passengers) had decided to continue the journey by boat. The aircraft broadcast a Mayday before it crashed into the sea, killing both crew. The bodies of the victims were picked up the Southern Railway's ferry Maid of Orleans.

23 May 1928
Farman F.63bis Goliath F-AEIE of Société Générale des Transports Aériens (SGTA) crashed on take-off from Cologne, Germany and was destroyed by fire. Three people were killed.

19 May 1929
Farman F.60 Goliath F-GEAI Vendee of Air Union, on a flight from Croydon to Paris crashed at Keylands Sidings near Paddock Wood railway station, it stopped yards from the signal box and was destroyed by fire, the pilot and mechanic escaped with minor injuries.

31 July 1929
Farman F.60 Goliath F-GEAB Savoie of Air Union, on a flight from London to Paris carrying gold bullion was damaged in a forced landing near Smarden in Kent, bushes on the riverbank stopped the aircraft entering the River Beult although some of the gold bullion it was carrying ended up in the river. The bullion was recovered by spectators and transferred by lorry to Lympne for onward transport to Paris. The aircraft may have been repaired and returned to service as its registration was not cancelled until 1 June 1932.

October 1929
Farman F.63bis Goliath F-FARI of Societe Generale de Transports Aeriens (SGEA) was destroyed in an accident.

10 February 1930
Farman F.63bis Goliath F-FHMY Picardie of Air Union crashed at Marden Airfield, Kent following failure of the starboard tailplane. Two passengers killed of the six people on board.

2 May 1930
Farman F.63bis Goliath F-ADCA Lorraine of Air Union crashed at Penshurst, Kent after encountering a heavy squall whilst on a flight from Le Bourget, Paris to Croydon.

23 April 1931
Farman F.63 Goliath F-ADDT Languedoc of Air Union, carrying mail, crashed at Widehurst Farm, Marden after taking off from Marden.

9 July 1930
Farman F.60 F-ADFQ of the SGTA crashed near Aalsmeer shortly after takeoff from Amsterdam. One crew member, a mechanic, died shortly after. The pilot and the radio operator escaped with slight injuries. The plane was a total loss.

== Survivors ==
No complete airframe survives. The forward fuselage of F-HMFU is exhibited at the Musée de l'Air et de l'Espace, Le Bourget, France.

== Specifications (F.63 BN.4) ==
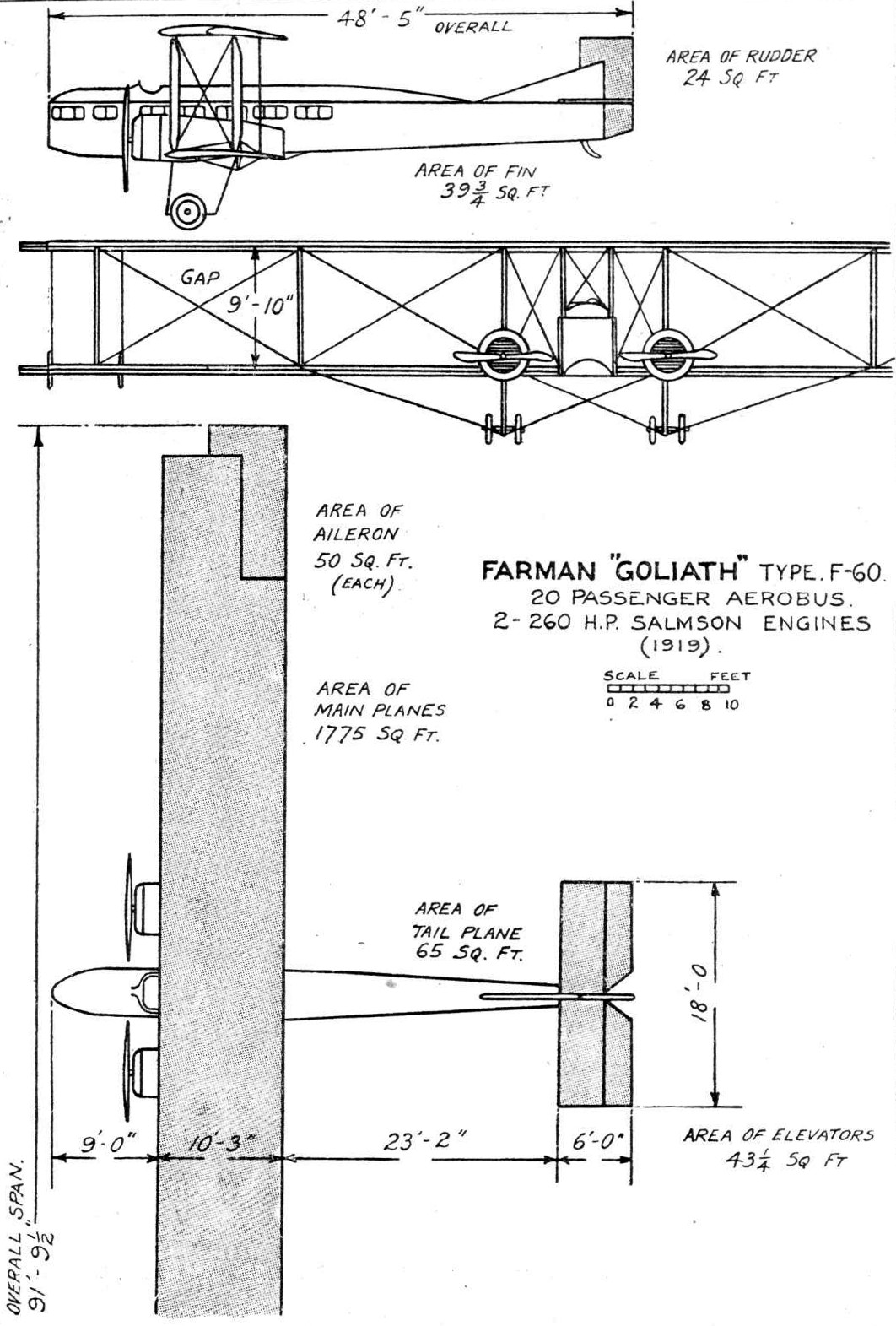
Three-view of original Farman F.60 Goliath from Flight, 2 October 1919

Data from Jane's all the World's Aircraft 1928

General characteristics

- Crew: 4
- Capacity: 12 or 14 passengers (civilian variant)
- Length: 14.77 m (48 ft 5 in)
- Wingspan: 26.5 m (86 ft 11 in)
- Height: 4.9 m (16 ft 1 in)
- Wing area: 160 m^{2} (1,700 sq ft)
- Empty weight: 2,900 kg (6,393 lb)
- Gross weight: 5,400 kg (11,905 lb)
- Powerplant: 2 × Gnome et Rhône 9A Jupiter 9-cylinder air-cooled radial piston engines, 340 kW (450 hp) each
- Propellers: 2-bladed fixed pitch propellers

Performance

- Maximum speed: 170 km/h (110 mph, 92 kn) at sea level

168 km/h (104 mph; 91 kn) at 1,000 m (3,300 ft)
165 km/h (103 mph; 89 kn) at 2,000 m (6,600 ft)
160.5 km/h (99.7 mph; 86.7 kn) at 3,000 m (9,800 ft)

- Range: 800 km (500 mi, 430 nmi)
- Service ceiling: 5,500 m (18,000 ft)
- Time to altitude: 1,000 m (3,300 ft) in 4 minutes 59 seconds

2,000 m (6,600 ft) in 11 minutes 31 seconds
3,000 m (9,800 ft) in 19 minutes 48 seconds
4,000 m (13,000 ft) in 31 minutes 2 seconds

- Wing loading: 34 kg/m^{2} (7.0 lb/sq ft)
- Power/mass: 0.1157 kW/kg (0.0704 hp/lb)

Armament

- Guns: 2x Lewis machine-guns at nose and rear gunners positions
- Bombs: provision for light bombs internally and larger weapons, including torpedoes, under the centre fuselage

== See also ==
- Farman F.140 Super Goliath

Related lists

- List of civil aircraft
- List of interwar military aircraft

== Bibliography ==
- Kotelnikov, V.; Kulikov, V. & Cony, C. (December 2001). "Les avions français en URSS, 1921–1941" [French Aircraft in the USSR, 1921–1941]. Avions: Toute l'Aéronautique et son histoire (in French) (105): 50–56. ISSN 1243-8650.
- Liron, Jean (1984). Les avions Farman. Collection Docavia. Vol. 21. Paris: Éditions Larivière. OCLC 37146471.
- Passingham, Malcolm (February 1999). "Les bombardiers de l'Armée japonaise (1920–1935)" [Japanese Army Bombers (1920–1935)]. Avions: Toute l'aéronautique et son histoire (in French) (71): 32–38. ISSN 1243-8650.
- Warner, Edward P. (May 2008). "Les avions de ligne au banc d'essai en 1921" [Airlines on the Test Bench in 1921]. Le Fana de l'Aviation (in French) (462): 44–55. ISSN 0757-4169.
