= 1926 in aviation =

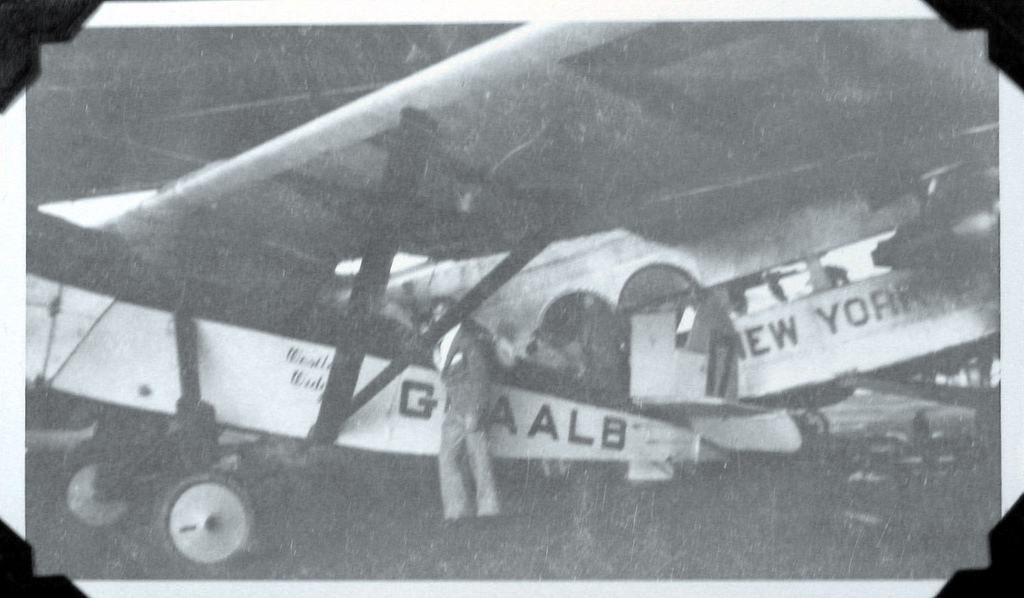
1926 Westland Widgeon (Br) and Ford Trimotor.

This is a list of aviation-related events from 1926:

== Events ==
- Award of the Harmon Trophy begins. A set of three trophies is awarded annually to the world's outstanding aviator, aviatrix (female aviator), and aeronaut (balloon or dirigible aviator) for the year, and a fourth trophy (the National Trophy) is awarded to the outstanding aviator for the year in each of the 21 member countries of the International League of Aviators.
- Fiat acquires the Società Anonima Aeronautica Ansaldo aircraft manufacturing subsidiary from the Gio. Ansaldo & C. shipbuilding company and combines it with its own Società Italiana Aviazione subsidiary to form a new Società Anonima Aeronautica d'Italia subsidiary for the design and production of aircraft.
- The first known reforestation of land by aircraft is carried by airplanes operating from Wheeler Field on Oahu in the Territory of Hawaii.
- Harold Frederick Pitcairn founds the Pitcairn Aircraft Company. It later will become the Autogiro Company of America.
- Summer 1926 – A Lieutenant Jira of Czechoslovakia flies Avia B.9.11 L-BONG 1,800 km (1,100 mi) from Prague to Paris and back at an average speed of 131.2 km/h (81.5 mph), a notable achievement at the time for an aircraft of the B.9's class.

=== January ===
- January 6 – Deutsche Luft Hansa is formed by the merger of Deutscher Aero Lloyd and Junkers Luftverkehr.
- January 22 – A Spanish four-man crew led by Spanish Air Force Major Ramón Franco – the brother of future Spanish dictator Francisco Franco – and including Captain Julio Ruiz de Alda Miqueleiz takes off from the Rio Tinto at Palos de Moguer, Spain, to begin a seven-stop flight to Buenos Aires in the Dornier Do J Wal ("Whale") flying boat Plus Ultra ("Farther Still"). After flying low past the Christopher Columbus Monument in Huelva, Spain, they make an uneventful 806-mile (1,298-km) flight to their first stop at Las Palmas in the Canary Islands.
- January 26 – Ramón Franco and his crew complete the second leg of their Spain-to-Buenos Aires flight, flying 1,081 miles (1,740 km) from Las Palmas in the Canary Islands to Porto Praia in the Cape Verde Islands in 9 hours 50 minutes.
- January 30 – Ramón Franco and his crew complete the third and longest leg of their Spain-to-Buenos Aires flight, flying 1,429 miles (2,300 km) from Barrera de Inferno in the Cape Verde Islands to Fernando de Noronha in 12 hours at an altitude of 1,000 feet (300 meters). It is the second-longest nonstop flight in history – exceeded only by a 1,890-mile North Atlantic Ocean crossing in a Vickers Vimy on 14-15 June 1919 by John Alcock and Arthur Whitten Brown – and they become the first aviators to cross the South Atlantic Ocean using only one aircraft. Rough weather forces them to spend the night on their flying boat Plus Ultra before they can dock at Fernando de Noronha.
- January 31 – Forced to throw their gear and luggage overboard to remain airborne after an in-flight engine failure, Ramón Franco and his crew complete the fourth leg of their Spain-to-Buenos Aires flight, flying 335 miles (539 km) from Fernando de Noronha to Recife, Brazil, where they receive a hero's welcome.

=== February ===
- February 1 – Controversial United States Army airpower advocate Billy Mitchell resigns from the United States Army Air Service with the permanent rank of colonel.
- February 4 – Spanish Air Force Major Ramón Franco, copilot/navigator Captain Julio Ruiz de Alda Miqueleiz, and their crew complete the fifth leg of their Spain–to–Buenos Aires flight in the Dornier Do J Wal ("Whale") flying boat Plus Ultra ("Farther Still"), flying 1,302 miles (2,095 km) from Recife, Brazil to Rio de Janeiro in 12 hours 16 minutes. Franco is at the controls for the entire flight. So many boats meet them that they have difficulty landing in Guanabara Bay without colliding with one.
- February 9 – Ramón Franco and his crew complete the sixth leg of their Spain-to-Buenos Aires flight, flying 1,277 miles (2,055 km) from Rio de Janeiro, Brazil, to Montevideo, Uruguay, in 12 hours 5 minutes.
- February 10 – Ramón Franco and his crew complete their Spain-to-Buenos Aires flight, flying the journey's seventh leg, a 136-mile (219 km) flight from Montevideo, Uruguay, to Buenos Aires where they receive another welcome by exuberant crowds. Over 20 days, they have completed the 6,300-mile (10,145-km) trip from Spain in just under 51 hours of flying time, a considerable achievement for the time. Franco's plans to fly back to Spain in Plus Ultra via Chile, Mexico, Cuba, and the Azores will be cancelled when the Government of Spain opts to present the plane to the Government of Argentina as a gift. Plus Ultra's crew instead will return to Spain aboard the Argentine Navy protected cruiser Buenos Aires as Spanish national heroes.
- February 12 – Straying two miles (3.2 km) off course while flying a Curtiss Carrier Pigeon for the United States Post Office on the overnight airmail delivery route from Chicago to New York City, pioneering American pilot Art Smith dies when he crashes into a grove of trees near Montpelier, Ohio. He is the second U.S. overnight mail service pilot to die on duty.

=== March ===
- March 1 – Four Royal Air Force Fairey IIIDs begin a long-distance flight, taking them from Cairo to Cape Town and then on to Lee-on-Solent, England, where they will arrive on June 2.
- March 4 – In Hawaii, two United States Army Air Service Loening OA-1 amphibians take off from Luke Field on Ford Island in Pearl Harbor on Oahu, fly to Kauai and land in a new harbor there, then return to Oahu, refuel, and fly on to Hilo on the island of Hawaii, making the final Oahu-to-Hilo leg of the flight in a record 2 hours 4 minutes. The Army Air Service intends the flight to demonstrate both the adaptability of amphibian aircraft and the practicality of interisland flight in Hawaii. In flying from Kauai to Hilo, the flight is hailed in Hawaii as the first to link all of Hawaii's major islands by air.
- March 16 – Robert Goddard launches the first liquid-fuelled rocket near Auburn, Massachusetts.
- March 24 – The Cierva Autogiro Company is founded in the United Kingdom.

=== April ===
- April 1 – The Italian airline Società Italiana Servizi Aerei begins operations linking Trieste, Venice, Pavia, and Turin with CANT 10 flying boats.
- April 6 – Varney Speed Lines begins operations in the U.S. It will later become Continental Airlines.
- April 7 – The Italian airline Società Anonima Navigazione Aerea (SANA) begins fight operations, offering flying boat service on the Genoa–Rome–Naples–Palermo route.
- April 10 – Three United States Army Air Service aircraft take photographs of an eruption of Mauna Loa volcano on the island of Hawaii, providing valuable scientific information. One of them, a de Havilland DH.4, makes four flights directly over the crater and — although it experiences severe buffeting and its crew becomes uncomfortably hot — and completes four flights of two hours' duration each.
- April 17 – Western Air Express (the future Western Airlines) begins operations with a contract mail flight from Salt Lake City, Utah, to Los Angeles, using a Douglas M-2. The airline will begin passenger services a month later.
- April 30 – Bessie Coleman, the first licensed African-American female pilot, is killed along with mechanic William Wills, who was piloting the plane, after they crash as a result of a wrench that Wills accidentally left loose getting stuck in the control gears.

=== May ===
- May 1 – Deutsche Luft Hansa begins the first night passenger airline service, with domestic flights in Germany between Berlin and Königsberg employing Junkers G 24 aircraft.
- May 4 – The Stinson Aircraft Corporation is incorporated.
- May 6 – Flying a Blackburn Dart, Flight Lieutenant Gerald Boyce makes the first night deck landing in history, landing aboard the British aircraft carrier HMS Furious off the south coast of England.
- May 9 – Richard Byrd and Floyd Bennett make the first flight over the North Pole in a Fokker VIIa-3m.
- May 11–14 - Roald Amundsen makes the first airship flight over the North Pole. The Norge leaves Spitzbergen and arrives in Teller, Alaska, three days later.
- May 20 – The Air Commerce Act becomes law in the United States. It creates an Aeronautics Branch (the predecessor of the Federal Aviation Administration) within the United States Department of Commerce, vesting that entity with regulatory powers to ensure civil air safety, including testing and licensing pilots, issuing certificates to guarantee the airworthiness of aircraft, making and enforcing safety rules, certifying aircraft, establishing airways, operating and maintaining aids to air navigation, and investigating accidents and incidents in aviation. It also directs that airways in the United States be charted for the first time, and assigns the responsibility to chart them to the United States Coast and Geodetic Survey.
- May 23 – Western Air Express (the future Western Airlines) becomes one of the first U.S. airlines to offer regular passenger service, beginning flights from Los Angeles, California, to Salt Lake City, Utah, via Las Vegas, Nevada.
- May 24 – The U.S. National Advisory Committee for Aeronautics (NACA) holds its first annual manufacturers' conference, which takes place at Langley Memorial Aeronautical Laboratory at Langley Field, Virginia, as a modest, one-day event with 46 attendees. By 1936, it will grow into a two-day event with more than 300 attendees each day.

=== June ===
- June 20 – The United States Coast Guard opens the first permanent Coast Guard Air Stations.
- June 26 – Flying a Potez 28, Ludovic Arrachart and his brother Paul depart Paris. By the time a broken fuel pipe forces them to land at RAF Shaibah near Basra, Iraq, 26 hours 30 minutes later, they will have set a new world aviation nonstop distance record of 4,313 km (2,680 mi).
- June 30 – Alan Cobham sets out on a round trip from England to Australia in a de Havilland DH.50. He will arrive back in London on October 1 and receive a knighthood for his accomplishment.

=== July ===
- July 2
  - The United States Army Air Service becomes the United States Army Air Corps.
  - In accordance with the redesignation of its parent service, the Air Service Tactical School at Langley Field in Virginia is renamed the Air Corps Tactical School.
  - An airplane drops tree seeds over a burned area of Hawaii in the first recorded instance of reforestation by airplane.
- July 3 – The United States Congress authorizes the President of the United States to detail U.S. Army Air Corps officers to the United States Department of Commerce for periods of not greater than one year to help promote civil aviation in the United States.
- July 16 – The Philadelphia Rapid Transit Company inaugurates the first daily passenger air service between Philadelphia, Pennsylvania, and Washington, D.C., using three-engine Fokker monoplanes seating 10 passengers to make three flights in each direction each day. The service lasts five months.
- July 24 – Two Deutsche Luft Hansa Junkers G.24s leave Berlin to make a round-trip to Beijing. They will return on September 26.
- July 26 – During United States Navy experiments with the operation of seaplanes from a submarine equipped with an aircraft hangar, the submarine USS S-1 (SS-105) carries out for the first time a full cycle of surfacing, removing the disassembled seaplane from its hangar, assembling it, launching it, retrieving it, disassembling it, stowing in its hangar, and submerging, on the Thames River at New London, Connecticut.
- July 30 – On his 63rd birthday, Henry Ford unveils the Ford Flivver, which he hopes will become a mass-produced "everyman's" aircraft, much as the Ford Model T had been manufactured as an "everyman's" vehicle.

=== August ===
- August 7 – The second Ford National Reliability Air Tour begins, with 25 contestants taking off from Ford Airport in Dearborn, Michigan. The tour cross-markets Ford Motor Company and its Stout Metal Airplane Division and showcases Henry Ford's interest in aviation. The event includes the unveiling of the prototype Ford Flivver, and the new Ford Trimotor participates, although it suffers a propeller failure that loosens its landing gear and one of its engines and makes a forced landing at Nova, Ohio. The tour uses a new scoring system for time to "stick" and "unstick" aircraft to the ground, helping to promote the use of brakes, which are unpopular at the time. Walter Beech and Vance Breese participate.
- August 18 – Flying in bad weather on a scheduled passenger flight from Paris-Le Bourget Airport outside Paris to Croydon Airport in London with 15 people aboard, the Air Union Blériot 155 F-AIEB Wilbur Wright strikes the roof of a barn and crashes into haystacks near Hurst, Kent, south of Lympne Airport, killing its two crew members and two of its 13 passengers.
- August 21 – The second Ford National Reliability Air Tour concludes with the competitors' return to Ford Airport in Dearborn, Michigan, at the end of a 2,585-mile (2,246 nmi; 4,160 km) course that included stops at Kalamazoo, Michigan; Chicago, Illinois; Milwaukee, Wisconsin; St. Paul, Minnesota; Des Moines, Iowa; Lincoln, Nebraska; Wichita, Kansas; Kansas City, Missouri; Moline, Illinois; Indianapolis, Indiana; Cincinnati and Cleveland, Ohio; Fort Wayne, Indiana. Walter Beech is the overall winner of the competition in a Travel Air airplane. A Pitcairn PA-2 Sesquiwing wins in two aircraft classes.
- August 27 – United States Navy aviation pioneer Commander John Rodgers dies in the crash of a single-engine plane he is piloting when it suddenly spins into the Delaware River near the Naval Aircraft Factory in Philadelphia, Pennsylvania. A mechanic aboard the plane with him survives.

=== September ===
- September 10–17 – The Daily Mail sponsors the third and final light airplane trials at Lympne Aerodrome in Lympne, England. A Hawker Cygnet flown by George Bulman wins. Flying an Avro 581 Avian, Bert Hinkler takes second place in three of the six trials before withdrawing with magneto problems.
- September 21 – Hoping to win the Orteig Prize, French World War I ace René Fonck attempts to take off from Roosevelt Field on Long Island in a severely overloaded Sikorsky S-35 for a nonstop transatlantic flight to Paris. The aircraft loses a wheel on takeoff, fails to gain lift, cartwheels off a bluff, and bursts into flames, killing two of its crew. Fonck survives.
- September 26 – The French aviators Dieudonné Costes and René de Vitrolles fly 4,100 km (2,500 mi) from Paris to Assuan, Egypt, in an attempt to break the world distance record.

=== October ===
- October 1 – Northwest Airways (the future Northwest Airlines) begins service as a contract U.S. mail carrier.
- October 2 – During a scheduled passenger flight from Paris-Le Bourget Airport outside Paris to Croydon Airport in London, the Air Union Blériot 155 F-AICQ Clément Ader experiences an in-flight engine fire and attempts an emergency landing at Leigh, Kent. It crashes and is consumed by fire, killing all seven people on board.
- October 21 – The British airship R.33 makes further parasite fighter tests, releasing two Gloster Grebes from 2,500 feet (762 m).
- October 22 – Curtiss F6C Hawk fighters of the United States Navy's Fighter Squadron 2 (VF-2) surprise U.S. Navy capital ships sortieing from San Pedro Harbor in California with a simulated dive-bombing attack, diving almost vertically from 12,000 feet (3,658 m). It generally is considered the birth of modern dive bombing.
- October 28 – The French aviators Dieudonné Costes and J. Rignot break the world distance record, flying 5,396 km (3,353 mi) from Paris to Jask, Persia, as a part of 19,625 km (12,194 mi) Paris–India–Paris flight.

=== November ===
- Adolphe Bernard's Société Industrielle des Métaux et du Bois (SIMB; Industrial Company for Metals and Wood) closes, a victim of bankruptcy. Bernard again will reorganize the company in September 1927 as the Société des Avions Bernard (Bernard Aircraft Company) and resume the design and production of aircraft.
- G. M. Lord announces the organization of Honolulu Airways, Ltd., a commercial airline which would carry passengers, mail, and freight between Honolulu and other points on Oahu and between Oahu and other islands in Hawaii. The airline never materializes.
- November 6 – Italo Balbo becomes Italy's Secretary of State for Air.
- November 13 – The 1926 Schneider Trophy race is flown at Hampton Roads, Virginia. Mario de Bernardi of Italy wins in a Macchi M.39 at 396.698 km/h (246.497 mph), a new world speed record.
- November 15 – T. Neville Stack and B. S. Leete leave England in an attempt to reach India by air in a de Havilland DH.60. They will arrive in Karachi on January 8, 1927.
- November 17 – Mario de Bernardi breaks his four-day-old world speed record, reaching 416.618 km/h (258.874 mph) in the same Macchi M.39 at Hampton Roads, Virginia, USA.

=== December ===
- December 7
  - In the United States, the first airway light beacon erected by the Aeronautics Branch (predecessor of the Federal Aviation Administration) of the United States Department of Commerce begins operation. It is located on the air mail route between Chicago, Illinois, and Dallas, Texas, 15 miles (24 km) northeast of Moline, Illinois. By June 30, 1927, the United States will have 4,121 miles (6,632 km) of lighted airways.
  - The Aeronautics Branch makes its first official airworthiness inspection of an American aircraft, testing a Stinson Detroiter before its delivery to Canadian Air Express.
- December 15 – Bert Hinkler and John F. Leeming, flying the Avro 585 Gosport biplane G-EBPH, take off from Woodford Aerodrome in Woodford, Greater Manchester, England, hoping to land on the mountain Helvellyn in the Lake District, but turn back because of bad weather.
- December 21 – Hinkler and Leeming depart Woodford Aerodrome in the Avro 585 Gosport biplane G-EBPH to make a second attempt at landing on Helvellyn, but turn back after finding the winds over the Lake District too strong to allow a landing.
- December 22 – Flying the Avro 585 Gosport biplane G-EBPH from Woodford Aerodrome, Hinkler (as passenger) and Leeming (as pilot) succeed in landing on the summit of Helvellyn. After asking a witness on the ground to sign a paper attesting to the landing, they take off and return to Woodford Aerodrome. They claim to have made the first landing on a mountain in the United Kingdom.
- December 31 – The first Air Commerce Regulations of the United States Department of Commerce's Aeronautics Branch go into effect. They require all aircraft engaged in interstate or foreign commerce to be licensed and marked with an assigned identification number; pilots of licensed aircraft to hold private or commercial licenses; and mechanics repairing aircraft engaged in air commerce to secure either engine or airplane mechanic licenses, or both. The regulations also class commercial pilots as either transport or industrial pilots, and prescribe operational and air traffic safety rules. Aircraft owners, pilots, and mechanics have until March 1, 1927 (later extended to May 1, 1927) to apply for licenses, and must comply with all licensing requirements by July 1, 1927.

== First flights ==
- Avro 571 Buffalo
- Bernard 15
- Boulton Paul Sidestrand
- Buhl-Verville CA-3 Airster
- Cierva C.8
- Dewoitine D.25
- Fairchild 71
- Farman F.150
- FBA 23
- Junkers A 32
- Junkers A 35
- Junkers G 31
- Latécoère 26
- Levasseur PL.4
- Pitcairn PA-2 Sesquiwing
- Pitcairn PA-3 Orowing
- Potez 28
- Westland Westbury
- Wright-Bellanca WB-2
- c. 1926 – Mitsubishi 2MB1
- Spring 1926 – Westland Racer

=== January ===
- January 12 – Polikarpov DI-1
- January 25 – Stinson Detroiter

=== February ===
- Latécoère 25
- February 14 – Ryan M-1
- February 19 – Dornier N/Kawasaki Ka 87

=== March ===
- Armstrong Whitworth Argosy G-EBLF

=== April ===
- April 24 - Handley Page Harrow (HP.31)

=== May ===
- Bernard SIMB AB 12
- May 5 – Wright XF3W Apache
- May 7 – Blériot 127

=== June ===
- ca. June – Saunders A.3 Valkyrie
- June 11 – Ford 4-AT Trimotor
- June 14 – Fairchild FC-1, prototype of the Fairchild FC-2
- June 17 – Junkers W 33
- June 19 – Blackburn Iris
- June 26
  - Avro 566 Avenger
  - Avro Tutor

=== July ===
- Latécoère 21
- Martin T3M
- July 6 – Macchi M.39

=== August ===
- August 9 – Focke-Wulf GL 18

=== September ===
- Avro 581, prototype of the Avro Avian
- De Havilland DH.66 Hercules G-EBMW

=== October ===
- Consolidated NY-2
- October 25 - Spartan C3
- October 27 - Blériot 165

=== November ===
- Saunders A.4 Medina G-EBMG
- November 3 – Boeing XF2B-1, prototype of the Boeing F2B

== Entered service ==
- Levasseur PL.2 with French Naval Aviation aboard the aircraft carrier Béarn

=== May ===
- Consolidated NY-1 with the United States Navy
- Farman F.170 Jabiru with Société Générale des Transports Aériens

=== June ===
- Breguet 19 B.2 bomber variant with the 11e Régiment d'Aviation de Bombardement of the French Army's Aéronautique Militaire
- June 16 – Armstrong Whitworth Argosy G-EBLO with Imperial Airways

=== August ===
- Lioré et Olivier 21 with Air Union

=== September ===
- Martin T3M with the United States Navy

=== December ===
- SABCA S.2 with SABENA

== Retirements ==
- Cox-Klemin XS by the United States Navy
- Grigorovich M-24 by Soviet Naval Aviation
- Martin MS by the United States Navy

=== March ===
- Avro 549 Aldershot by No. 99 Squadron, Royal Air Force
