= F170 =

F170 may refer to:

- Farman F.170 Jabiru, a 1925 single-engine airliner
- HMS Antelope (F170), a 1971 Type 21 frigate of the Royal Navy that participated in the Falklands War
- 70th Anniversary Grand Prix, a 2020 Formula 1 round.
