= Potez 34 =

French aircraft

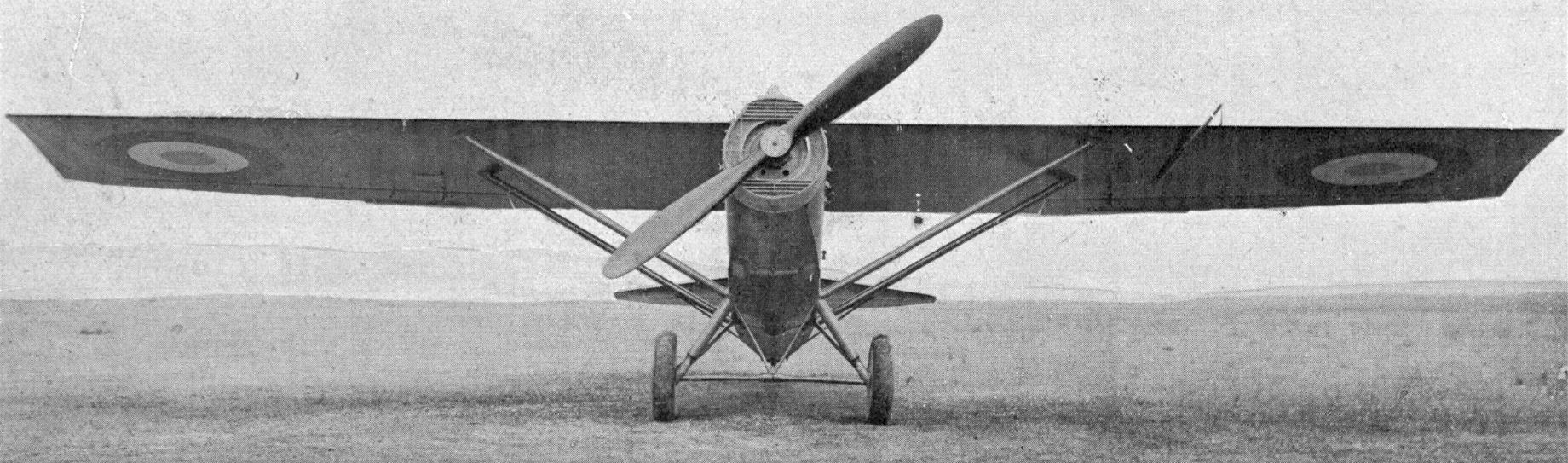

General information
- Type: Record breaking aircraft
- National origin: France
- Manufacturer: Henry Potez
- Number built: 1

History
- First flight: 25 May 1928
- Developed from: Potez 28

The Potez 34 was a recording breaking aircraft, designed and built in France in the late 1920s. Only one was completed.

== Design and development ==
The Potez 34 was built by Aéroplanes Henry Potez and was derived from the Potez 28M and used the Ryan NYP's blind flying / periscope configuration.

Intended to win the distance record in closed circuit and then in a straight line, the first record attempts of the Potez 34 were punctuated by tyre punctures and oil leaks. Modifications were made including the exchange of the Farman engine with a lighter Hispano-Suiza and the adoption of a metal propeller. On 18 June 1929, the French distance in closed circuit record was beaten over a course of 6,517 km (4,049 mi) flown by Lionel de Marmier and Louis Favreau, but the world record could not be broken due to a technical failure. On 25 June 1929, the same crew attempted to break the distance record in a straight line, flying to the Far East, but propeller vibrations necessitated a landing in Tunisia and the failure of the attempt.

The Potez 34 was lent by the Ministere de l'Air to Joseph Le Brix, assisted by Maurice Rossi, for a flight from Paris to Saigon, with three stops at Benghazi, Basra and Allahabad. The attempt began 16 December 1929 and a breakdown occurred over Burma on the night of 22 to 23 December 1929, the aircraft crashed into the jungle but the crew parachuted to safety.

== Variations ==
34.1
Farman Engine 12 We
34.2
Hispano-Suiza engine 12 Lbr

== Users ==
- France

Armée de l'Air

== Specifications ==
Data from

General characteristics

- Crew: Two
- Length: 11.50 m (37 ft 9 in)
- Wingspan: 18.30 m (60 ft 0 in)
- Height: 3.91 m (12 ft 10 in)
- Wing area: 61 m^{2} (660 sq ft)
- Empty weight: 1,900 kg (4,189 lb)
- Gross weight: 5,920 kg (13,051 lb)
- Fuel capacity: 350 L (77 imp gal; 92 US gal) in wing tanks.
- Powerplant: 1 × Hispano-Suiza 12Lbr liquid cooled V-12, 450 kW (600 hp)
- Propellers: 2-bladed

Performance

- Maximum speed: 242 km/h (150 mph, 131 kn) at sea level
- Cruise speed: 150 km/h (93 mph, 81 kn)
- Ferry range: 6,700 km (4,200 mi, 3,600 nmi)
- Service ceiling: 4,500 m (14,800 ft)
