= Joseph Le Brix =

French aviator

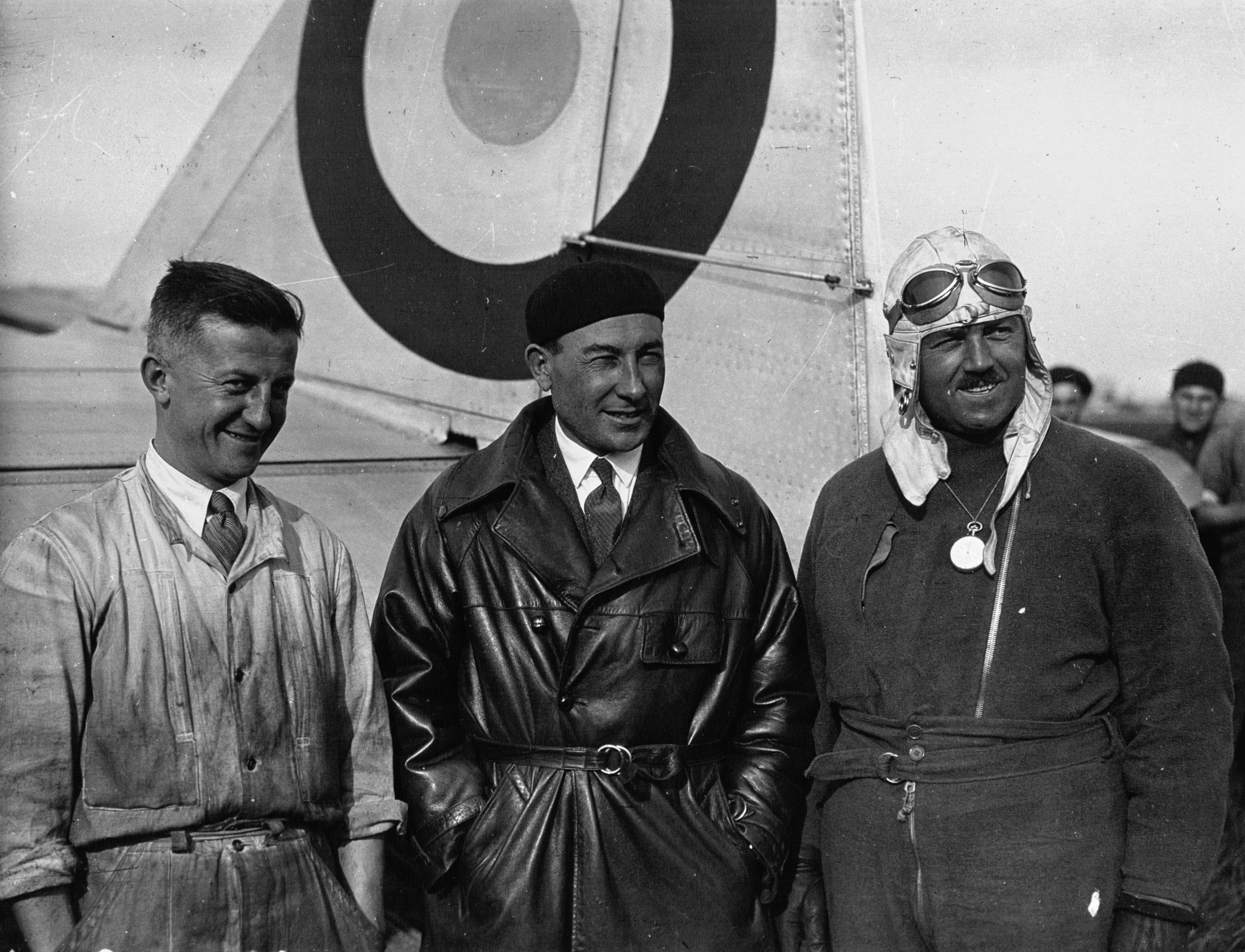
- Left to right: René Mesmin (1897–1931), Joseph Le Brix (1899–1931), and Marcel Doret (1896–1955) standing in front of the Dewoitine D.33 Trait d'Union II in 1931
- Born: 22 February 1899; Baden, Morbihan, France
- Died: 12 September 1931 (aged 32); Stary Burtyuk, Soviet Union
- Burial place: Baden, Morbihan, France
- Military career
- Allegiance: France
- Branch: French Navy
- Service years: c. 1918 – 1931
- Rank: Capitain de corvette
- Conflicts: Rif War
- Awards: Croix de Guerre (France); Legion of Honor (France); Distinguished Flying Cross (United States)

Joseph Le Brix (22 February 1899 – 12 September 1931) was a French aviator and a capitaine de corvette (lieutenant commander) in the French Navy. He is best known for an around-the-world flight he made as copilot and navigator in 1927–1928 which included history's first flight across the South Atlantic Ocean, and for record-setting nonstop long-distance flights he made or attempted between 1929 and 1931.

== Biography ==
=== Early life ===
Le Brix was born on 22 February 1899 in Baden, Morbihan, in the Brittany region of northwestern France.

=== Early career ===
Le Brix enrolled in the French naval academy, the École Navale, in Brest on 2 April 1918 and completed his basic seamanship training aboard the academy's training ship, the French Navy armored cruiser Jeanne d'Arc. After graduating from the academy, he served aboard the armored cruiser Jules Michelet. He then began training as a naval aviator in 1924, and qualified as an aerial observer and navigator in September 1924. Promoted to lieutenant de vaisseau ("ship-of-the-line lieutenant"), he received his pilot's license in March 1925.

By August 1925, Le Brix was serving in French Naval Aviation's Escadrille (Squadron) 5.B.2 and taking part in the Rif War, flying missions over Spanish Morocco in a Farman F.60 Goliath. He flew geographic survey missions over the Sahara Desert in southern French Morocco until 1927, pioneering the use of maritime navigation techniques not yet in wide use aboard aircraft. For his service, he was awarded the Croix de Guerre and the Legion of Honor.

=== Flight around the world ===
By October 1927, Le Brix was a capitain de corvette ("corvette captain," the equivalent of a lieutenant commander). On 10 October, he and the French aviator Dieudonné Costes left Paris in the Breguet 19 G.R. Nungesser-Coli to attempt a trip around the world, with Costes as pilot and Le Brix as copilot and navigator. Their first leg was a flight to Saint Louis, Senegal, where they landed on 11 October. The second leg was the world's first nonstop aerial crossing of the South Atlantic Ocean, flying from Saint-Louis to Port Natal, Brazil, on 14–15 October. The two men then visited every country in South America before flying north across Panama and Mexico to the United States, reaching Washington, D.C., on 6 February 1928. By this time, their friendship had broken down, to the point that they almost had a fistfight during a reception hosted by the French ambassador in Washington.

Despite their growing dislike for one another, the two men pushed on, flying across the United States to San Francisco, California. There they boarded a ship to cross the Pacific Ocean by sea. Arriving in Tokyo, Japan, they resumed their flight, stopping in French Indochina, India, French Syria, and Greece before completing their trip with an arrival before an enthusiastic crowd at Paris–Le Bourget Airport in Paris on 14 April 1928. The trip had covered 57,410 kilometers (35,652 miles) by air in 338 flight hours over 187 days with 43 stops. Le Brix's relationship with Costes was ruined, however; upon arrival at Paris–Le Bourget, Le Brix supposedly said sharply, "Finally I am no longer the servant of Costes."

The round-the-world flight made Le Brix one of France's most famous aviators. Le Brix and Costes were both awarded the Distinguished Flying Cross by a special act of the Congress of the United States on 2 May 1928 in recognition of their achievement.

After completing the around-the-world trip, Le Brix became an instructor at the flight school of the École Navale in Brest, training pilots for both French Naval Aviation and the French Army's air service, the Aéronautique Militaire.

=== France-Saigon flight attempts ===
Now rivals, Le Brix and Costes planned to set out in early 1929 in separate attempts to become the first pilot to fly from Paris to Saigon in French Indochina in fewer than five stages. Le Brix secretly set out first, taking off in February in the Bernard 197GR from Istres, France, with his copilot Antoine Paillard and mechanic Camille Jousse. They had already reached Tunis in French Tunisia when Costes learned of their departure and angrily decided to take off in his own aircraft even though its engine was not yet ready for the flight; the engine failed soon after Costes took off and he crashed into a forest near Paris, although he survived. Meanwhile, Le Brix, Paillard, and Jousse flew 11,220 kilometers (6,968 miles) to Burma before having to crash-land in tidal waters 30 miles (48 km) south of Moulmein on 26 February 1929, wrecking the Bernard 197GR and Jousse breaking a leg.

Le Brix made a second attempt to fly from France to Saigon in December 1929. Taking off in a Potez 34 on 16 December with Maurice Rossi as copilot, he again got as far as Burma, flying 10,500 kilometers (6,521 miles) in 72 hours of flight time before the two men had to bail out over the rain forest on 22 December 1929 after encountering severe weather.

=== Closed-circuit records ===
In June 1931, Le Brix, Dewoitine chief pilot Marcel Doret, and mechanic René Mesmin broke the record for the longest flight over a closed circuit, flying the Dewoitine D.33 Trait d'Union, funded by the French billionaire François Coty. In a 70-hour nonstop flight from Istres that lasted from 7 to 10 June, they flew 10,372 kilometers (6,441 miles). They also set eight other closed-circuit records, including for flight duration and speed.

=== Paris-Tokyo flight attempts and death ===
Le Brix, Doret, and Mesmin decided to follow up their success by using Trait d'Union to attempt the first non-stop flight between Paris and Tokyo. Taking off from Paris–Le Bourget Airport on 12 July 1931, they had made it to the vicinity of Lake Baikal in Siberia when the aircraft's engine iced up. Le Brix and Mesmin parachuted to safety, and Doret crash-landed the plane into the treetops of a Siberian forest. All three men survived unharmed.

Undaunted, the men decided to make a second attempt, departing Paris–Le Bourget Airport on 11 September 1931 in a second Dewoitine D.33 named Trait d'Union II, hoping to beat their competitors, Paul Codos and Henri Robida, who took off the same day in the Breguet 19 TF Super Bidon Point d'Interrogation also intending to fly nonstop to Tokyo; Codos and Robida, however, were forced to land at Düsseldorf, Germany, after only a few hours. Flying on, Le Brix, Doret, and Mesmin were over Ufa in the Soviet Union on 12 September when the aircraft's engine failed and they decided to bail out. Doret jumped first, parachuting to safety. Mesmin apparently had trouble with his parachute and could not follow, so Le Brix stayed with the airplane rather than leave Mesmin alone on board. The D.33 crashed and caught fire near Stary Burtyuk village, killing both Le Brix and Mesmin.

France honored Le Brix with a state funeral at Notre Dame Cathedral in Paris on 25 September 1931. He was buried in his native Baden.

The crash of Trait d'Union II and death of Le Brix prompted the French government to refuse clearance to any French aviator who wished to attempt to set a nonstop long-distance record with a flight that took him or her beyond the borders of Metropolitan France. Until it lifted the ban in 1933, French aviators were forced to attempt to set such records only on closed-circuit courses within Metropolitan France.

== Commemoration ==
In January 1932, the French aviators Lucien Bossoutrot and Maurice Rossi named the Blériot 110 they used to set several nonstop flight distance records Joseph Le Brix in Le Brix's honor. Rennes–Saint-Jacques Airport also was named for him, as was a school in Baden, and a bridge in the town of Bono is named Pont Joseph Le Brix. Streets in Baden, Nantes, Lorient, Bourges, Toulouse, Tours, Marseille, Vannes, Pontivy, and Saint-Avé, among others, bear his name, as does a plaza in Langueux.

The Passions and Wings museum in Baden is dedicated to Le Brix and his biography, and a memorial plaque in his honor is mounted on the façade of Collège Jules Simon in Vannes, where he was a student.

The French Navy frigate Le Brix (F715), which served as a weather ship while in commission from 1948 to 1958, was named in Le Brix's honor.
