= Kawasaki Ka 87 =

Japanese bomber

Do N, Ka 87
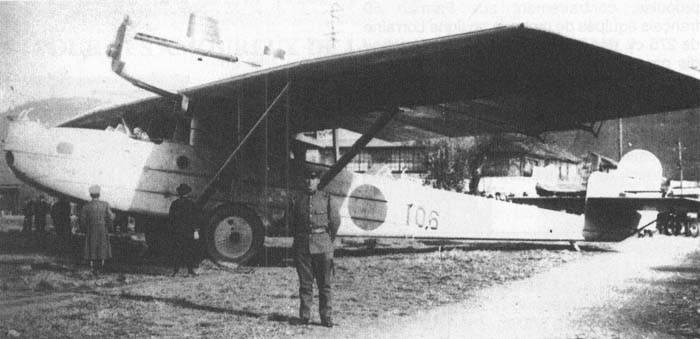

General information
- Type: Bomber
- Manufacturer: Kawasaki Kōkūki Kōgyō K.K.
- Designer: Richard Vogt of Dornier
- Primary user: Imperial Japanese Army Air Force
- Number built: 28

History
- First flight: 19 February 1926

The Dornier N was a bomber aircraft designed in Germany in the 1920s for production in Japan. Production of 28 aircraft started in Japan in 1927, as the Kawasaki Ka 87 (also known as the Type 87 Night Bomber). Designed and built as a landplane, its layout was strongly reminiscent of the Dornier flying boats of the same period; a parasol-wing, strut-braced monoplane with two engines, mounted in a push-pull nacelle above the wing. Some of the 28 examples built saw action in Manchuria in 1931.

== Specifications ==
Data from Japanese Aircraft 1910–1941

General characteristics

- Crew: six (pilot, co-pilot, bombardier, navigator, radio operator and engineer)
- Length: 18.0 m (59 ft 1 in)
- Wingspan: 26.80 m (87 ft 11 in)
- Height: 5.85 m (19 ft 2 in)
- Wing area: 121 m^{2} (1,300 sq ft)
- Empty weight: 4,400 kg (9,700 lb)
- Gross weight: 7,700 kg (16,976 lb)
- Powerplant: 2 × Kawasaki BMW VI water-cooled V-12 engines, 450 kW (600 hp) each

Performance

- Maximum speed: 181.1 km/h (112.5 mph, 97.8 kn) at sea level
- Cruise speed: 171 km/h (106 mph, 92 kn)
- Service ceiling: 5,000 m (16,000 ft)
- Time to altitude: 44 minutes to 3,000 ft (910 m)

Armament

- Guns: 5× 7.7 mm machine guns (twin mounts in nose and dorsal positions, single gun in ventral position)
- Bombs: 1000 kg (2200 lb)

== Bibliography ==
- Mikesh, Robert C.; Abe, Shorzoe (1990). Japanese Aircraft 1910–1941. London: Putnam. ISBN 0-85177-840-2.
- Passingham, Malcolm (February 1999). "Les bombardiers de l'Armée japonaise (1920–1935)" [Japanese Army Bombers (1920–1935)]. Avions: Toute l'aéronautique et son histoire (in French) (71): 32–38. ISSN 1243-8650.
- Taylor, Michael J. H. (1989). Jane's Encyclopedia of Aviation. London: Studio Editions. p. 328.
- Zuerl, Walter (1941). Deutsche Flugzeug Konstrukteure. München, Germany: Curt Pechstein Verlag.
