= Latécoère 32 =

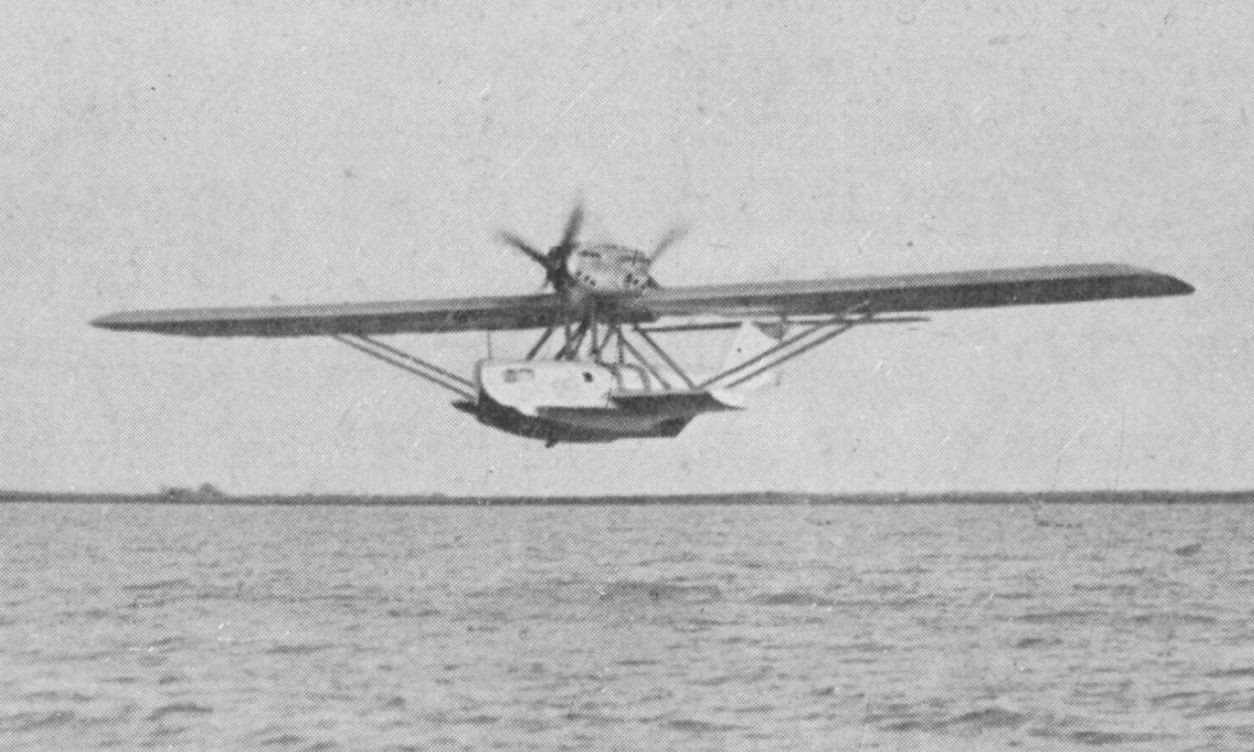
- Latécoère 32.3

General information
- Type: Flying boat mail plane
- National origin: France
- Manufacturer: Latécoère
- Primary user: Aéropostale
- Number built: 8

History
- First flight: 1928
- Developed from: Latécoère 23

The Latécoère 32 was a flying boat built in France in 1928 for use on Aéropostale's mail routes to North Africa.

== Development ==
A strengthened and enlarged version of the Latécoère 23, it was a parasol-wing monoplane with sponsons for stability in the water and two engines mounted in tandem push-pull configuration on the wing.

== Operational history ==
Put into service on the Marseille–Algiers and Toulouse–Algiers routes, the aircraft proved most unreliable and were involved in a number of accidents. At the end of 1931, the five surviving examples were re-engined with Hispano Suiza 12Hbr engines and re-designated Latécoère 32-3, which persisted in service a little longer.

Eight Latécoère 32's were built with the following construction numbers (numéros d'usine) and registrations:-

- n^{o}77 - F-AILN
- n^{o}78 - F-AILU
- n^{o}79 - F-AILT
- n^{o}80 - F-AISN
- n^{o}81 - F-AISO
- n^{o}82 - F-AIRU
- n^{o}84 - F-AITX
- n^{o}85 - F-AJBK

== Variants ==
- Latécoère 32 - original version with Farman 12We engines.
- Latécoère 32-3 - remotorised version with Hispano-Suiza 12Hbr engines.

== Operators ==
- Air France
- Aéropostale

== Specifications (Latécoère 32-3) ==
Data from

General characteristics

- Crew: One pilot
- Capacity: Mail, or up to 4 passengers
- Length: 16.34 m (53 ft 7 in)
- Wingspan: 28.00 m (91 ft 10 in)
- Height: 6.145 m (20 ft 2 in)
- Wing area: 123.0 m^{2} (1,324 sq ft)
- Empty weight: 5,400 kg (11,904 lb)
- Gross weight: 7,500 kg (16,535 lb)
- Powerplant: 2 × Hispano-Suiza 12Hbr , 373 kW (500 hp) each

Performance

- Maximum speed: 202.5 km/h (126 mph, 109 kn) at sea level
- Cruise speed: 172 km/h (107 mph, 93 kn)
- Range: 1,500 km (930 mi, 810 nmi)
- Service ceiling: 4,100 m (13,450 ft) attained in 44 mins
- Rate of climb: 2.87 m/s (565 ft/min) at sea level

== See also ==
Aircraft of comparable role, configuration, and era

- Dornier Do 18
