= Farman F.70 =

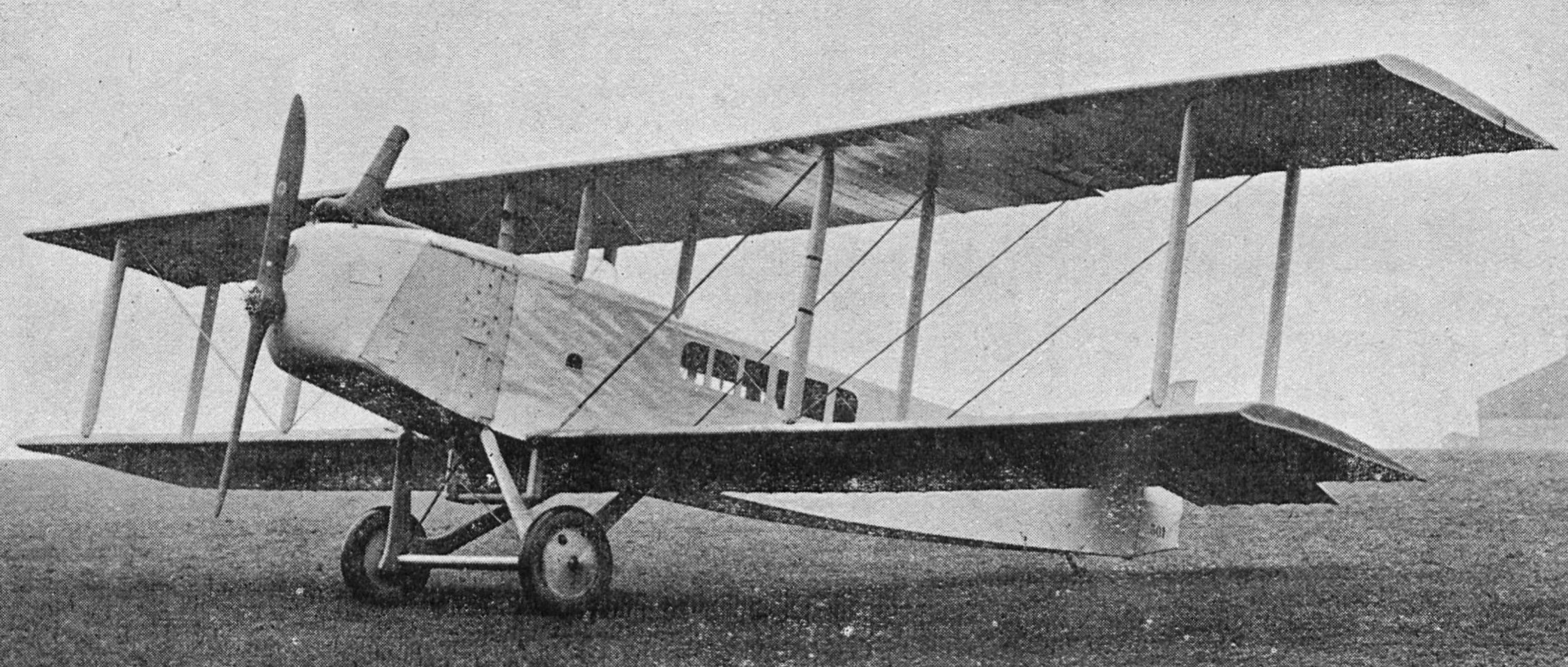

General information
- Type: Passenger/Mail transport
- Manufacturer: Farman Aviation Works
- Primary user: Lignes Farman
- Number built: 20

History
- First flight: 1920

The Farman F.70 was a 1920s French passenger and mail transport aircraft designed and built by the Farman Aviation Works. It was a smaller counterpart to the company's popular F.60 Goliath. The F.70 was an unequal-span two-bay biplane with a wooden fuselage and was powered by a Renault 12Fe piston engine. The pilot was seated in an open cockpit behind the nose-mounted engine. Behind the open cockpit was a cabin for four passengers or freight.

The aircraft could be fitted with a Gnome-Rhône Jupiter 9Aa radial engine and was then designated the Farman F.73. An experimental three-seat bomber variant was built but did not go into production.

Several aircraft of this series entered service with French airlines in the 1920s. The main operator was Farman's own airline Lignes Farman who operated five aircraft between Paris, Amsterdam and Brussels. Lignes Aeriennes Latécoère used the aircraft to operate passenger and mail routes between Casablanca and Dakar and also from Algiers to Biskra. Other operators used the aircraft on French internal routes. The Polish operator Aero acquired five F.70s in 1925.

== Variants ==
F.70
Main production variant powered by a 300hp (224kW) Renault 12Fe V-12 piston engine.
F.73
Variant re-engined with a 380hp (282kW) Gnome et Rhône 9Aa Jupiter radial piston engine.

== Operators ==
Brazil

- Brazilian Air Force

France

- Lignes Farman operated five aircraft.
- Lignes Aeriennes Latécoère operated four aircraft.

Poland

- Aero bought five F.70s in 1925.

Venezuela

- Venezuelan Air Force

== Specifications (F.70) ==
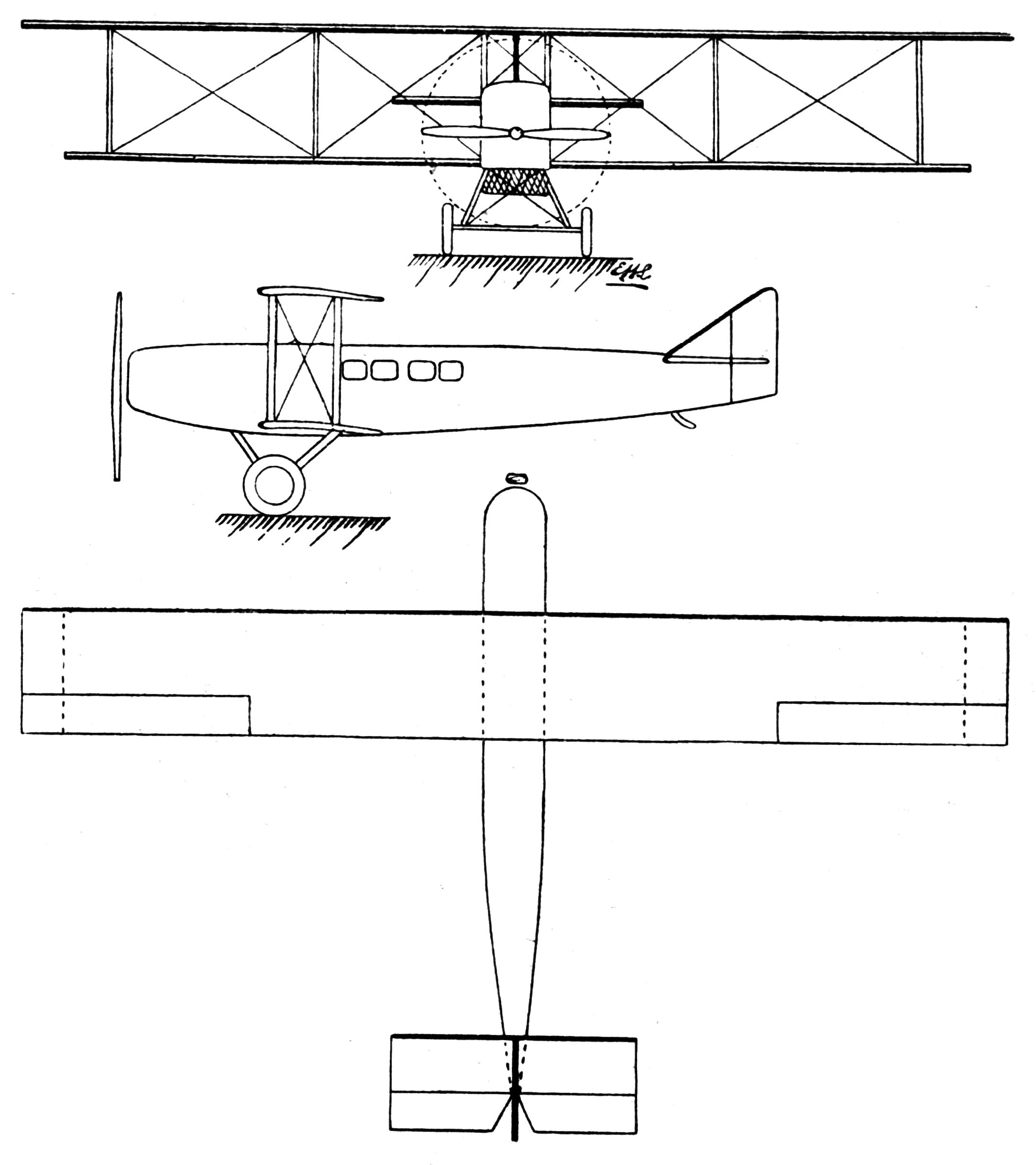
Farman F.70 3-view drawing from Les Ailes October 27,1921

Data from The Illustrated Encyclopedia of Aircraft (Part Work 1982-1985), 1985, Orbis Publishing, Page 1739

General characteristics

- Crew: 1
- Capacity: 4 passengers
- Length: 10.10 m (33 ft 1.5 in)
- Wingspan: 14.90 m (48 ft 10.5 in)
- Height: 3.43 m (11 ft 3 in)
- Wing area: 53.50 m^{2} (575.89 sq ft)
- Empty weight: 1,330 kg (2,992 lb)
- Gross weight: 2,050 kg (4,519 lb)
- Powerplant: 1 × Renault 12Fe V-12 piston engine , 224 kW (300 hp)

Performance

- Maximum speed: 175 km/h (109 mph, 95 kn)
- Range: 400 km (249 mi, 216 nmi)
- Service ceiling: 4,900 m (16,075 ft)

== Bibliography ==
- The Illustrated Encyclopedia of Aircraft (Part Work 1982-1985), 1985, Orbis Publishing, Page 1739
- Liron, Jean (1984). Les avions Farman. Collection Docavia. Vol. 21. Paris: Éditions Larivière. OCLC 37146471.
