= Farman F.140 Super Goliath =

F.140 Super Goliath
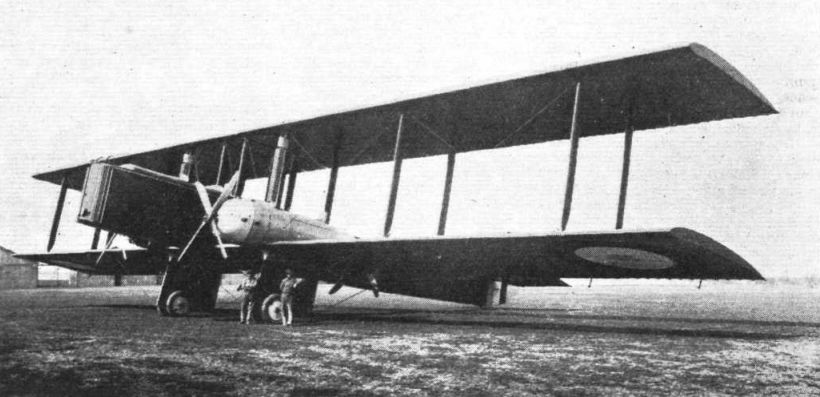
- F.140 Super Goliath circa 1925

General information
- Type: Heavy night bomber
- Manufacturer: Farman
- Primary user: l'Armeé de l'Air
- Number built: 9

History
- First flight: April 1924
- Retired: 1930

The Farman F.140 Super Goliath was a very large, four-engined, biplane night bomber, designed in France in the mid-1920s. Nine flew with the French Air Force until concerns about structural weakness grounded them in 1930. The prototype set several world records for altitude reached with heavy useful loads.

== Design and development ==
Two different Farman types have taken the name Super Goliath, the first being the sole Farman BN.4 of 1922. The F.140, first flown in April 1924, also had 4 engines, though these were more powerful, but was slightly smaller; small numbers served briefly with l'Armeé de l'Air.

The F.140 was a large triple bay biplane with unstaggered, constant chord, square tipped wings. The interplane gap was large, with the upper plane held high above the fuselage by a set of four vertical centre section struts. The interplane struts were also simple parallel pairs. It had four 500 hp (373 kW) Farman 12We engines, water-cooled units with their cylinders, in three banks of four, arranged in W or broad arrow configuration. These were mounted on the lower wings as tractor/pusher pairs, each pair in a single cylindrical housing with domed ends, in the inner bays. Each engine drove a four-blade propeller, each constructed from a pair of two-blade airscrews bolted to the drive shafts at right angles. Tall, narrow radiators were placed vertically above the engine housings.

The fuselage of the F.140 was flat sided, the nose rounded into an upright half-cylinder. It had a conventional undercarriage with pairs of mainwheels mounted on solid, broad, rectangular, vertical extensions below the engines.

The F.140 Super Goliath flew for the first time in April 1924. It was followed in 1930 by the F.141, a modernised version with a nose with a "balcony", a forward thrusting overhanging structure for a gun emplacement. This increased the length by 1.17 m (3 ft 10 in).

== Operational history ==
The prototype F.140 and two more pre-production aircraft were accepted by the Armeé de l'Air. In early 1930 they were joined by six production type F.141s. Meanwhile, doubts were being raised at the Air Ministry about the safety of all Farman multi-motor aircraft, following a number of accidents. In September 1930, all such Farman types, including the Super Goliaths, were grounded.

In mid-November 1925, piloted by Farman test pilot Louis Bossoutrot, the prototype F.140 had set several load related world aviation records. These were

with 2,000 kg useful load, an altitude of 4,990 m;
with 5,000 kg useful load, an altitude of 3,586 m and a duration of 72 min 21 s;
greatest useful load to 2,000 m, 6,000 kg.

The altitude achieved with a 5,000 kg load remained the world record on 1 January 1931.

== Variants ==
F.140
Prototype and pre-production. 3 built, second and third with some changes to the nose.
F.141
Production version with balcony nose extension. 6 built.

== Operators ==
France

- French Air Force

=== Units using this aircraft ===
6th squadron of the 22nd RABN, Chartres

== Specifications (F.140) ==
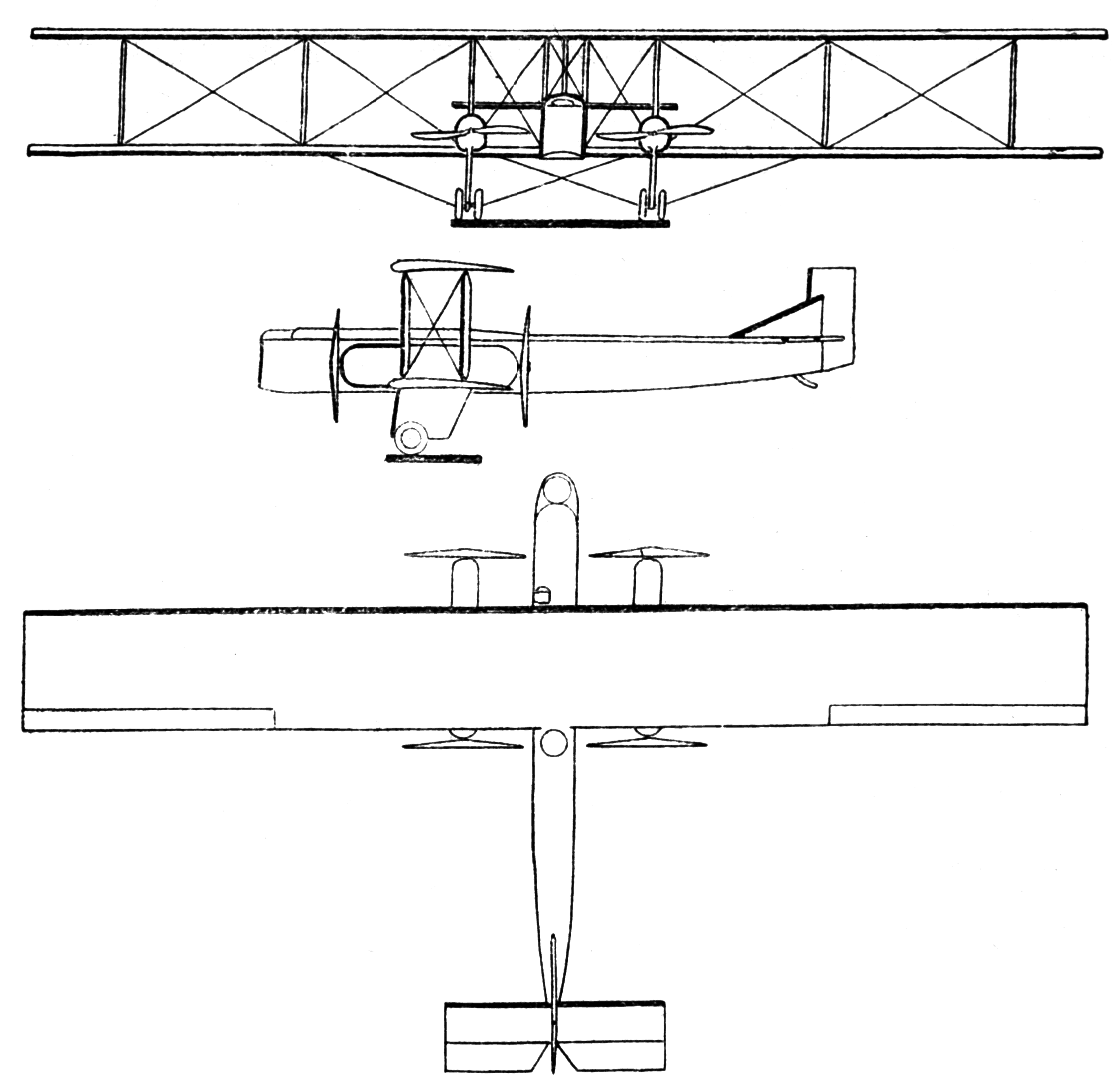
Farman F.140 Super Goliath 3-view drawing from Les Ailes February 26, 1926

Data from Les Avions Farman

General characteristics

- Crew: 6
- Length: 19.70 m (64 ft 8 in)
- Wingspan: 31.40 m (103 ft 0 in)
- Height: 6.50 m (21 ft 4 in)
- Wing area: 241.00 m^{2} (2,594.1 sq ft)
- Empty weight: 7,705 kg (16,987 lb)
- Gross weight: 11,792 kg (25,997 lb)
- Powerplant: 4 × Farman 12We W-12 (three banks of 4 cylinders) water-cooled, 370 kW (500 hp) each
- Propellers: 4-bladed Levasseur

Performance

- Maximum speed: 182 km/h (113 mph, 98 kn)
- Range: 450 km (280 mi, 240 nmi)
- Service ceiling: 6,500 m (21,300 ft)
- Time to altitude: 26 min 19 s to 4,000 m (13,123 ft)

Armament

- Bombs: 3,000 kg (6,610 lb)

== Bibliography ==
- Liron, Jean (1984). Les avions Farman. Collection Docavia. Vol. 21. Paris: Éditions Larivière. OCLC 37146471.
