= Farman A.2 =

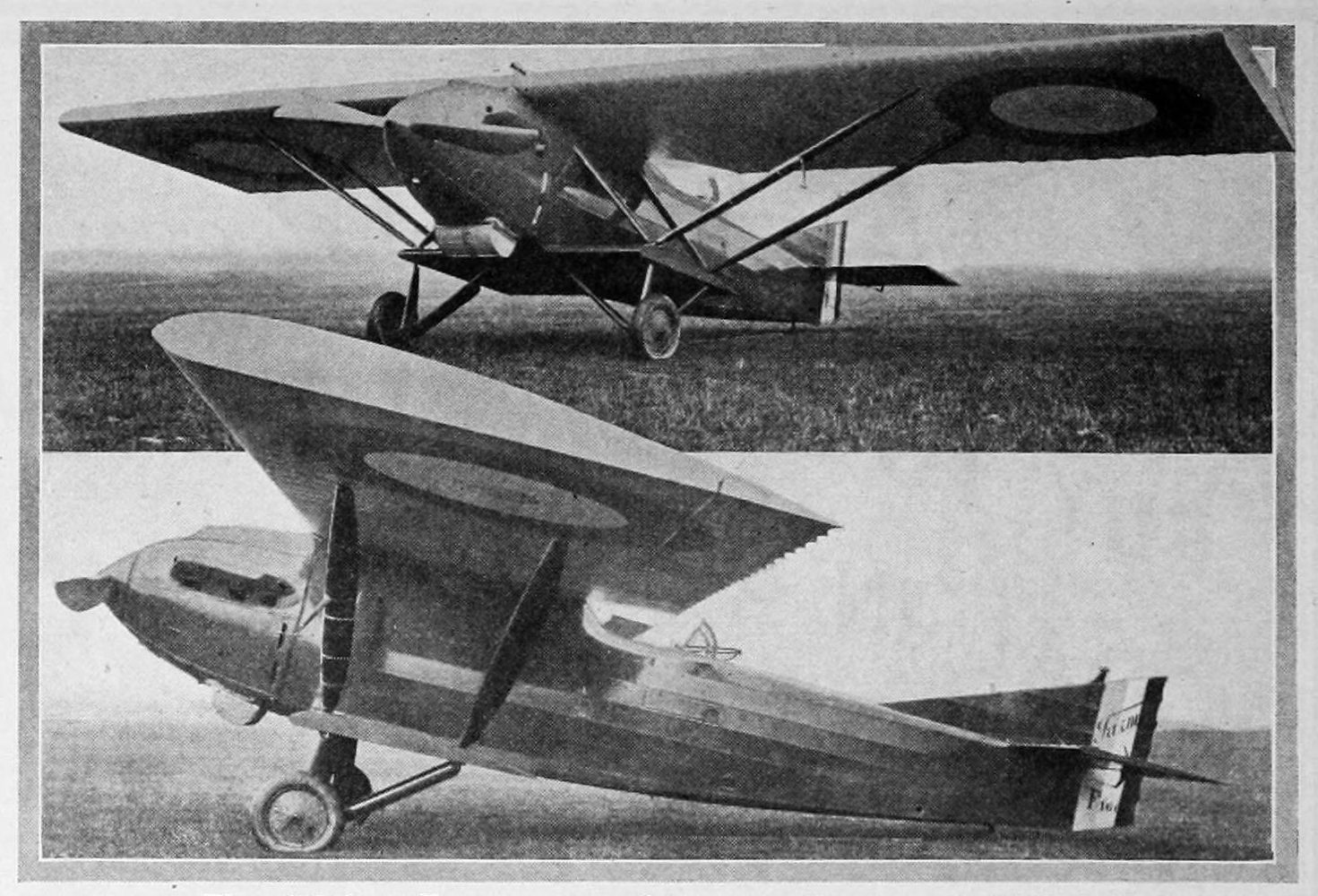

General information
- Type: Observation monoplane
- National origin: France
- Manufacturer: Farman
- Number built: 1

History
- First flight: 1920s

The Farman F.160 A.2 (sometimes referred only as the A.2 from the French military specification A = reconnaissance 2 = two-seater) was a 1920s French sesquiplane designed as a military reconnaissance and observation aircraft. Only one was built.

== Development ==
The open-cockpit tandem two-seat sesquiplane was displayed at the 1924 Paris Salon de l'Aeronautique. It was designed to minimise drag and the wide-chord wing was faired into the top of the fuselage and the aircraft was carefully faired. The aircraft did not meet performance expectations and was scrapped, and the F.160 designation was reused for a biplane bomber developed from the Farman F.60 Goliath.

== Specifications ==
Data from

General characteristics

- Crew: 2
- Length: 10.5 m (34 ft 5 in)
- Wingspan: 15 m (49 ft 3 in)
- Height: 3.4 m (11 ft 2 in)
- Wing area: 52 m^{2} (560 sq ft)
- Empty weight: 1,500 kg (3,307 lb)
- Gross weight: 2,500 kg (5,512 lb) *Useful load: 1,000 kg (2,200 lb)
- Powerplant: 1 × Farman 12We W-12 water-cooled piston engine, 370 kW (500 hp)

Performance

- Maximum speed: 220 km/h (140 mph, 120 kn) at 5,000 m (16,000 ft)
- Service ceiling: 7,000 m (23,000 ft)

Armament

- Guns: 4 × 7.7 mm (0.303 in) machine guns
