= Latécoère 23 =

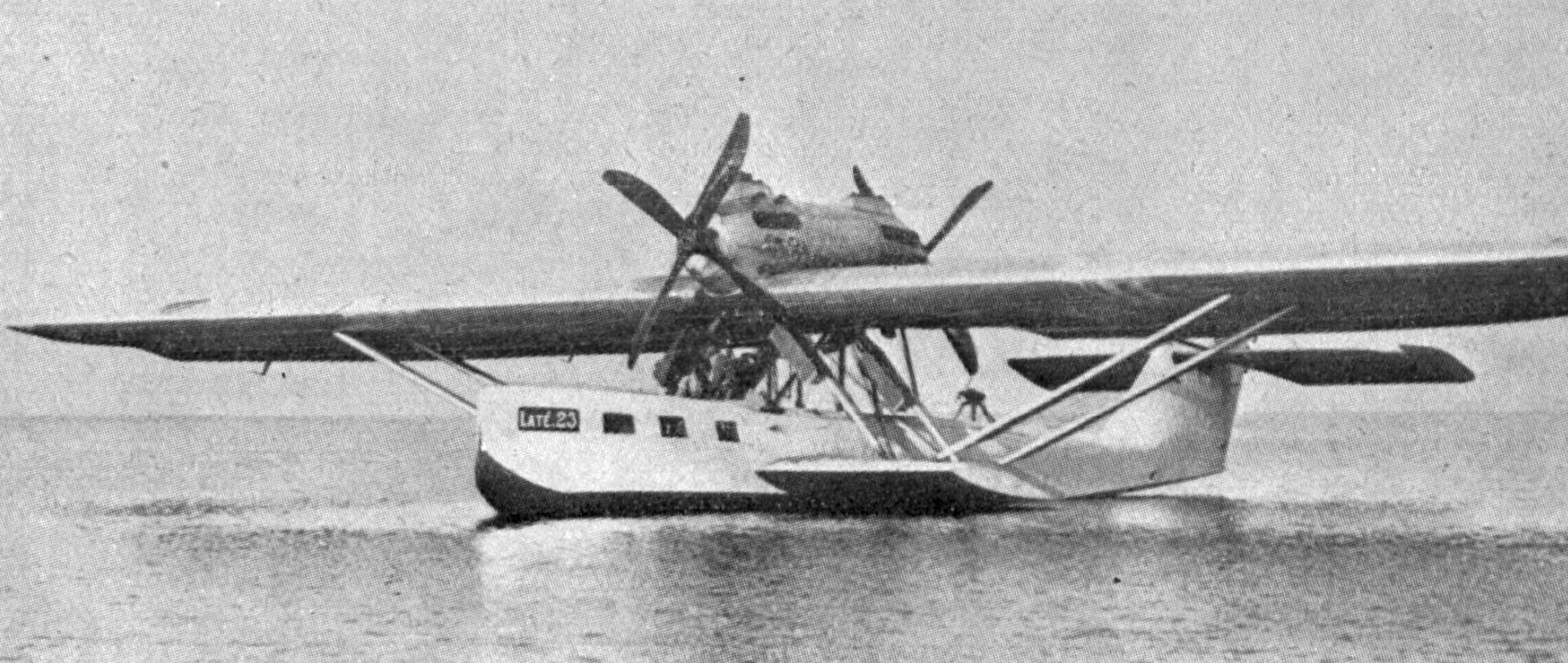

General information
- Type: Flying boat transport
- National origin: France
- Manufacturer: Latécoère (La societe industrielle d'aviation Latécoère)
- Designer: Marcel Moine and P.G.Latécoère
- Number built: 1

History
- First flight: late 1927
- Developed from: Latécoère 21
- Variant: Latécoère 32

The Latécoère 23 was a development of the Latécoère 21 flying boat, a twin-engined parasol winged aircraft. Only one was built, flying and crashing in late 1927. The similar Latécoère 32 was its immediate successor.

== Design and development ==
The Latécoère 23 was a development of the Latécoère 21, the latter Latécoère's first flying boat to leave the water. It kept the same general arrangement, a parasol winged machine with a centrally mounted push-pull pair of engines and sponsons for stability on the water. Its wing, like that of the earlier aircraft was very rectangular and of mixed wood and metal construction. The span was increased by 27% and the wing area by about the same. The sharply cropped wingtips of the Latécoère 21 were replaced by bevelled ends of decreasing thickness. The Latécoère 23 carried full span ailerons in three sections per wing, fitted with trim tabs. The wings were not attached directly to the fuselage, but to the sponsons: on each side a parallel pair of streamlined struts leaned outwards from near the tip of the sponson to mid-wing, and a second pair ran inwards to the wing centreline below the engines. On the Latécoère 21 the engines were mounted on the chord line, but the two 500 hp (373 kW) Farman 12 Wes of the later aircraft were mounted on the upper surface of the wing. Propellers were four bladed and wooden.

The fuselage of the Latécoère 23 was 1.30 m (2 ft) shorter than that of its predecessor and the major hydrodynamic alteration was the inclusion of two steps rather than one. It was built of wood. The broad sponsons of airfoil section and almost rectangular plan were also mostly made of wood apart from four duralumin longerons. They were set at an appropriate angle of incidence to provide extra lift. There was a mooring position in the nose, an open cockpit for pilot and mechanic. Two internal cabins, one ahead of the cockpit and one aft could each accommodate four passengers. The tail unit of the Latécoère 23 was much cleaner than that of its predecessor, with control surfaces merging smoothly into the lines of tailplane and fin. The former was unbraced and mounted about halfway up the fin, with a large cut-out for rudder movement.

Achille Enderlin, Latécoère's test pilot was in charge of trials during the autumn of 1927. These passed without incident, but on 31 December 1927, with Enderlin and four others on board spun in during landing approach, killing everyone. No more Latécoère 23s were built, but by the time of the crash the first examples of its rather similar successor, the Latécoère 32 were in service.

== Specification ==
Data from Cuny 1992 p.101 Performance figures are estimates

General characteristics

- Crew: 3
- Capacity: 8 passengers
- Length: 16.60 m (54 ft 6 in)
- Wingspan: 28.00 m (91 ft 10 in)
- Height: 4.80 m (15 ft 9 in)
- Wing area: 123 m^{2} (1,324 sq ft)
- Empty weight: 5,006 kg (11,036 lb)
- Gross weight: 7,503 kg (16,541 lb)
- Powerplant: 2 × Farman 12We water-cooled W-12 piston engine , 373 kW (500 hp) each

Performance

- Maximum speed: 187 km/h (116 mph, 101 kn)
- Service ceiling: 3,500 m (11,500 ft)
- Rate of climb: 1.35 m/s (266 ft/min)
