= Farman 12We =

1920s French piston aircraft engine

12We
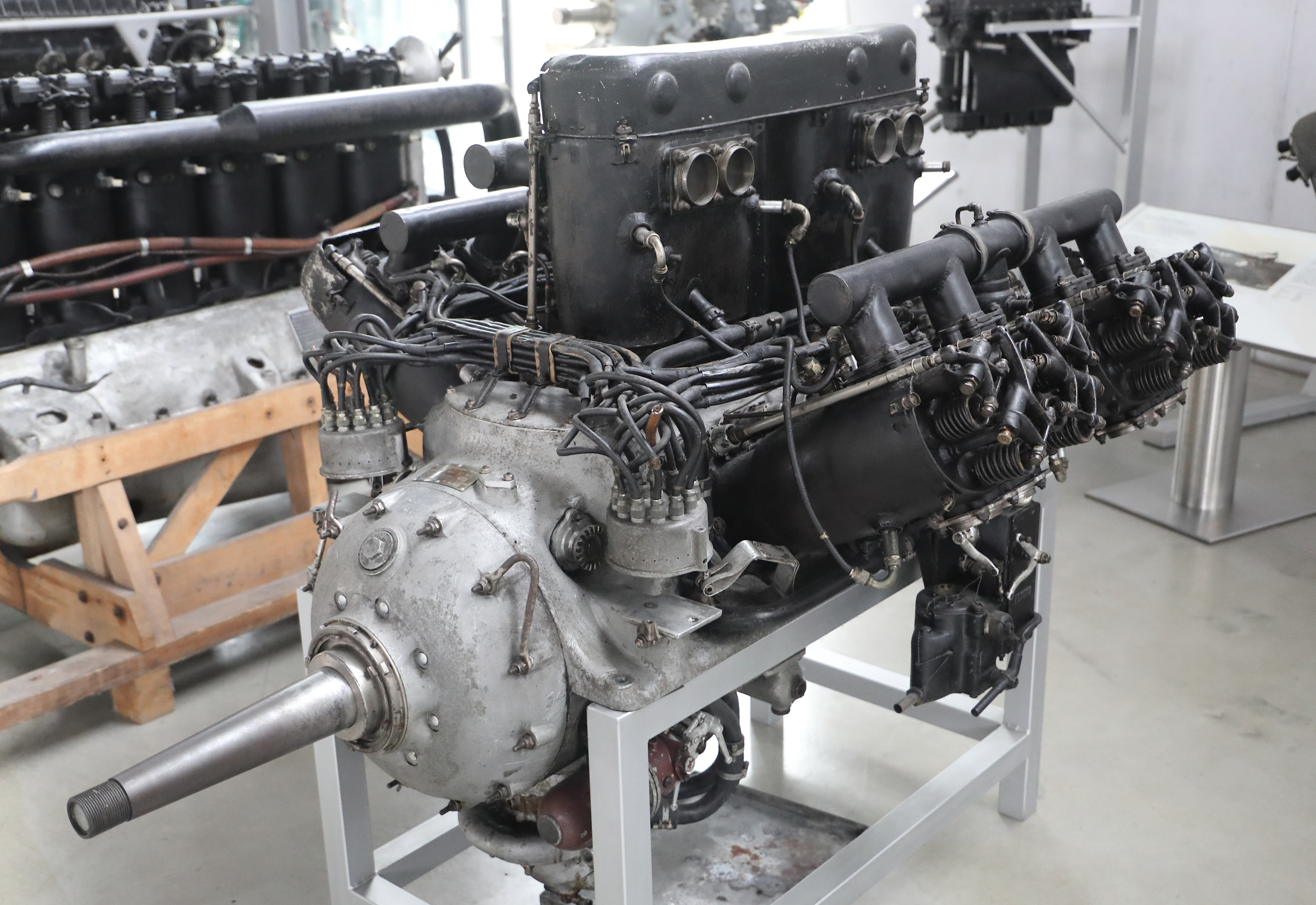
- Farman 12We on display at Deutsches Museum Flugwerft Schleissheim
- Type: Piston aero engine
- Manufacturer: Farman Aviation Works
- First run: October 1922 (First flight)
- Major applications: Farman F.60 Goliath

The Farman 12We was a French 12-cylinder broad arrow configuration aircraft engine that was designed and built by Farman in the early 1920s. Power output was 370 kilowatts (500 hp).

== Design and development ==
The Farman company developed and produced aero engines from 1915; the 12We was the company's most produced engine. Following the cylinder layout of the Napier Lion this engine featured three banks of four cylinders and employed water cooling.

The 12We was first flown in a Farman F.60 Goliath in October 1922 and later set a distance record powering a Farman F.62 in 1924, the engine ran continuously for 38 hours.

== Variants ==
12Wers
with 0.5:1 reduction gear and KP24 supercharger.

== Applications ==
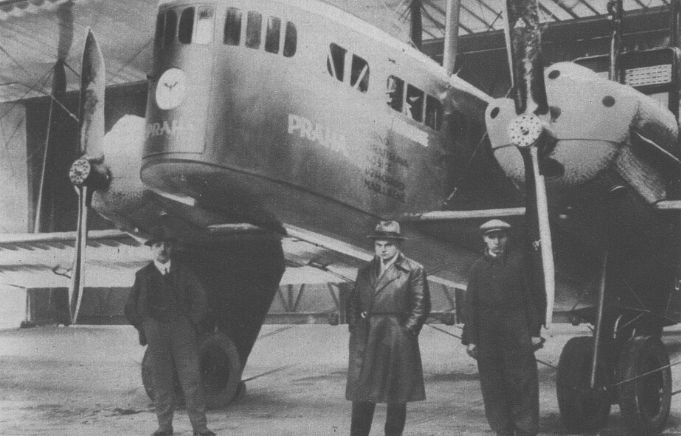
Farman F.60 Goliath in 1929

- Breguet 19
- Dewoitine D.14
- Dornier Do J
- Farman A.2
- Farman F.60 Goliath
- Farman F.62
- Farman F.140 Super Goliath
- Farman F.160
- Farman F.170 Jabiru
- Farman F.180
- Farman F.1000
- Latécoère 21
- Latécoère 23
- Latécoère 24
- Latécoère 32
- Latham 47
- Lublin R-VIII
- Potez 25
- Potez 28

== Engines on display ==
Preserved Farman 12We engines are on static display at the following museums:

- Deutsches Museum Flugwerft Schleissheim
- Polish Aviation Museum

== Specifications ==
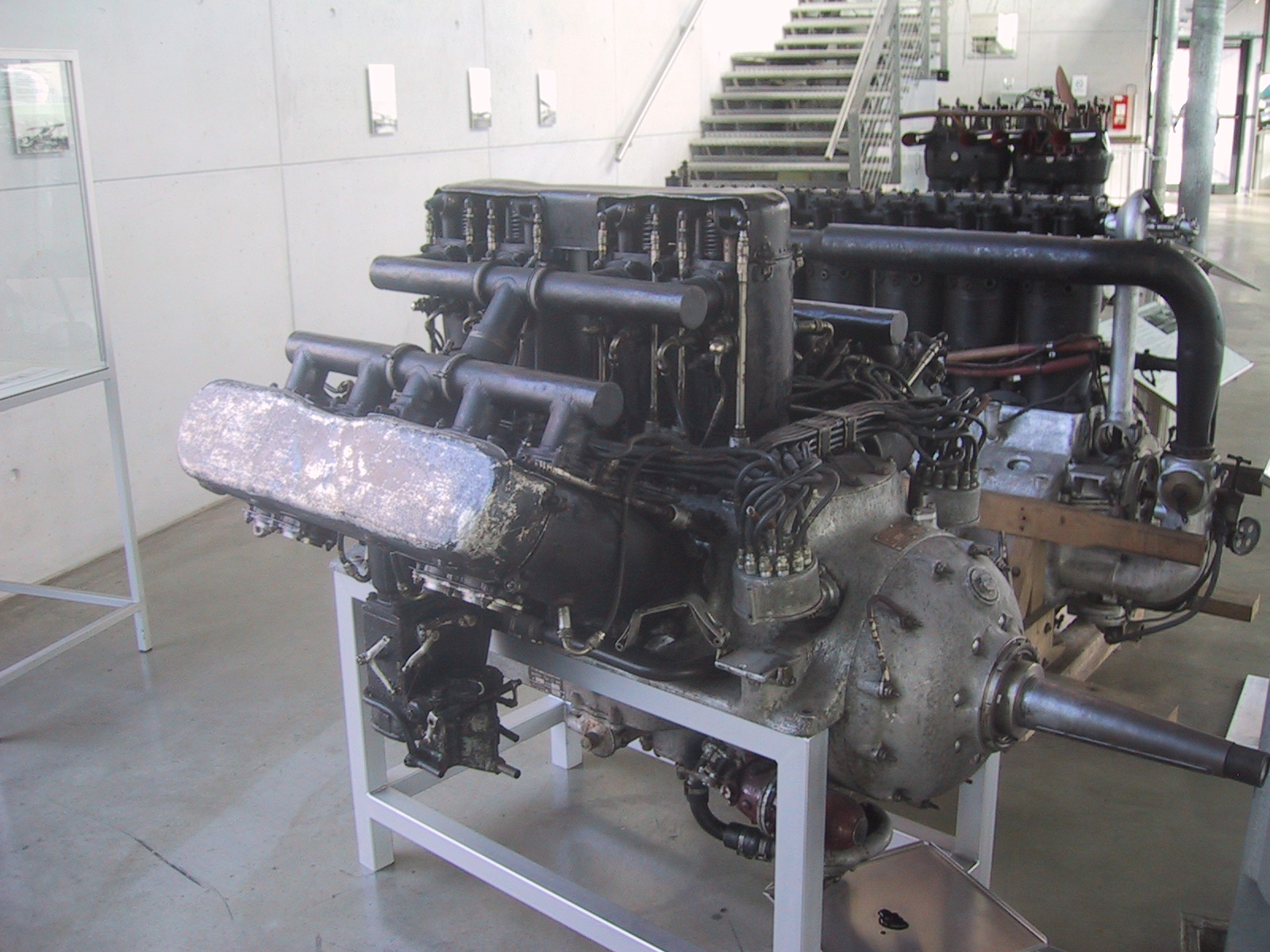
Right side view of the 12 We engine on display at the Deutsches Museum Flugwerft Schleissheim

Data from Gunston.

=== General characteristics ===
- Type: 12-cylinder water-cooled W-block (3 banks of 4 cylinders) aircraft piston engine
- Bore: 130 mm (5.1 in)
- Stroke: 160 mm (6.3 in)
- Displacement: 25.48 L (1,555 cu in)
- Dry weight: 470 kg (1,036 lb)

=== Components ===
- Valvetrain: Overhead valve
- Cooling system: Water-cooled

=== Performance ===
- Power output: 373 kW (500 hp) at 2,150 rpm

== See also ==
Comparable engines

- Lorraine 12E Courlis
- Napier Lion

Related lists

- List of aircraft engines
