= Dewoitine D.14 =

Dewoitine 14
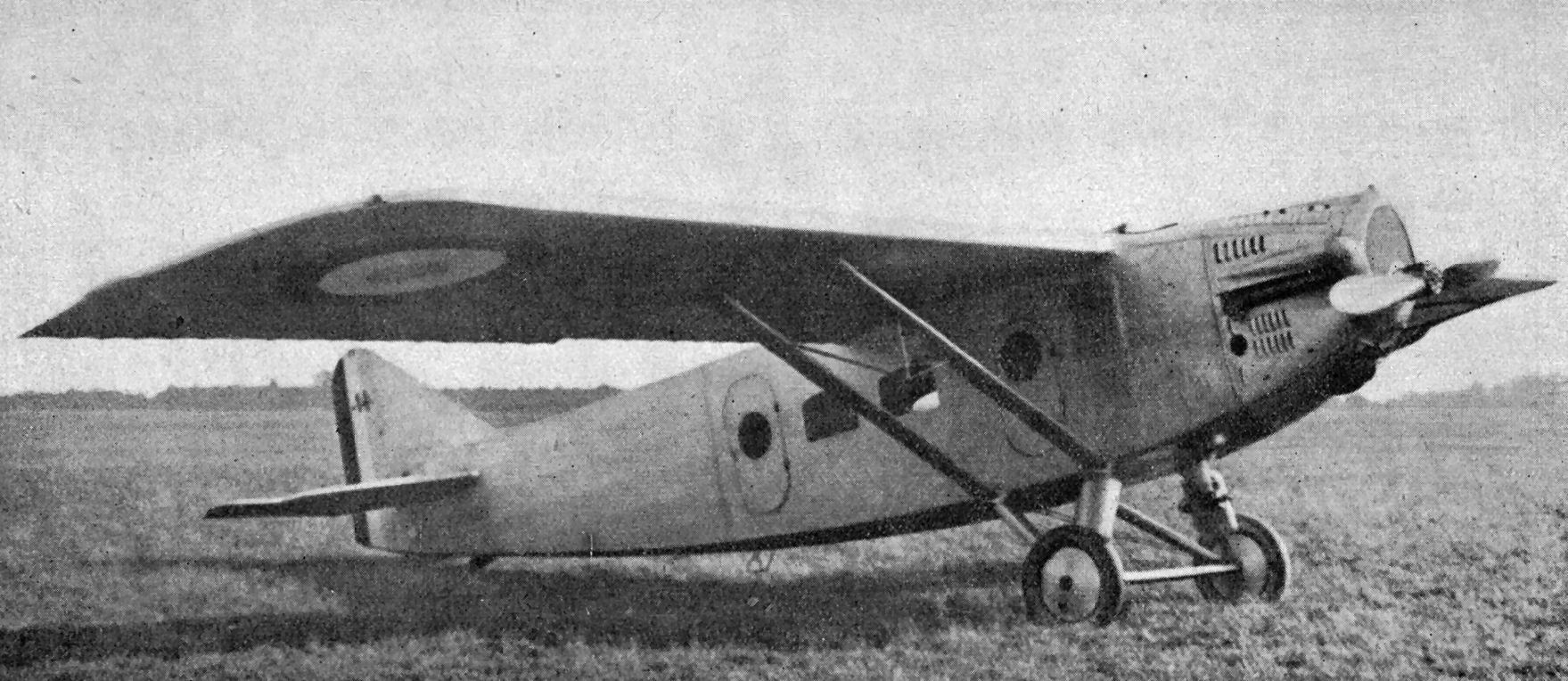

General information
- Type: Six-passenger airliner or commercial transport
- National origin: France
- Manufacturer: Dewoitine
- Primary user: CIDNA
- Number built: 1

History
- First flight: late January - early February 1925

The Dewoitine 14 was a mid-1920s French civil transport, capable of carrying mixture of passengers and freight. The sole example was used in commercial trials.

== Design and development ==
Dewoitine aircraft, gliders and ultralights apart, had generally been metal-framed but the all-wood D.14 was an exception. Designed as a civil transport, it could carry up to six passengers or a mixture of passengers and freight.

It was a high wing monoplane with a two part, straight-edged, unswept wing of constant chord out to angled tips. Each half-wing was built around two spars and was fabric covered. On each side a pair of faired struts braced the spars to the lower fuselage longerons. Its overhung ailerons were aerodynamically balanced.

The D.14 was powered by a 340 kW (450 hp) Lorraine 12E Courlis W12 engine, water-cooled with a pair of Lamblin radiators. Part of the fuel was in wing tanks and part in the fuselage. The engine was enclosed under a closely fitted cowling which followed the three banks of cylinders. Behind the engine the fuselage had a rectangular cross-section defined by four longerons. The pilot's open cockpit, offset to port, was in the wing leading edge. The central, windowed part of the fuselage contained passengers and freight and was divided into three compartments. The forward one, under the wing, could either be given over to freight or contain two passenger seats. A central compartment provided four seats and the rearmost contained a toilet and had separate entry doors to the cabin and a baggage hold.

The empennage was conventional with a swept, straight-edged tailplane mounted on top of the fuselage and a triangular fin. Both rudder and elevator were balanced, the latter with overhung tips like those of the ailerons.

The D.14 had a conventional, fixed landing gear. A pair of V-struts, splayed slightly outwards, were attached to the lower fuselage longerons and supported a rigid axle, with the mainwheels 2.50 m (8 ft 2 in) apart. The forward components of the V-struts were telescopic, with shock absorbers and coil springs inside their streamlined fairings.

== Operational history ==
The D.14 first appeared in public, still unflown, at the Paris Aero Salon held in December 1924. In January it was at Villacoublay, with trials scheduled to begin in the week starting 20 January. It had flown by 4 February 1925.

In December 1925 the D.14 was about to start commercial trials with CIDNA, fitted with a 336 kW (450 hp) Farman 12We W-12 engine. In May 1926 it was tested at Toussus-le-Noble, its performance reported as "much improved" because the geared-down Farman engine had allowed a larger diameter propeller to be fitted. In August 1926 it was at Villacoublay, still with this engine, now reported as delivering 373 kW (500 hp).

== Specifications ==
Data from Flight, December 1924

General characteristics

- Crew: One
- Capacity: Six passengers
- Length: 12.20 m (40 ft 0 in)
- Wingspan: 18.80 m (61 ft 8 in)
- Height: 3.35 m (11 ft 0 in)
- Wing area: 45.5 m^{2} (490 sq ft)
- Empty weight: 1,850 kg (4,079 lb)
- Max takeoff weight: 2,800 kg (6,173 lb)
- Fuel capacity: 350 kg (770 lb) including oil
- Powerplant: 1 × Lorraine 12E Courlis water-cooled W12 engine, 340 kW (450 hp)
- Propellers: 2-bladed wooden

Performance

- Maximum speed: 180 km/h (110 mph, 97 kn) at 2,000 m (6,600 ft)
- Endurance: 4 hr
- Landing speed: 78 km/h (48 mph)
