= Farman BN.4 =

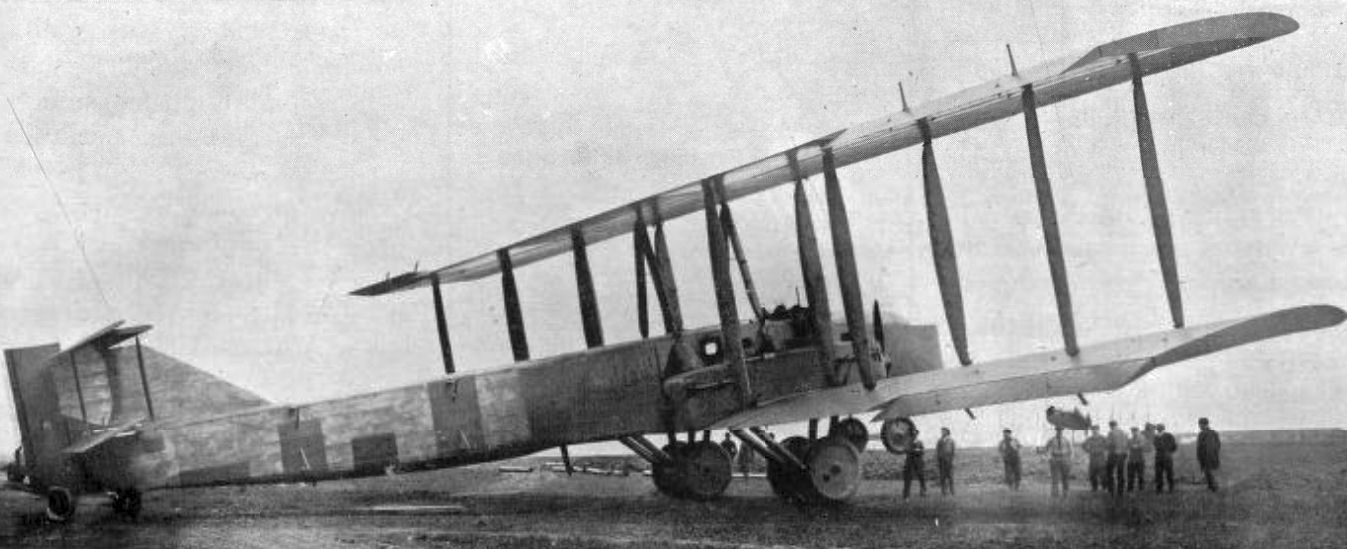

General information
- Type: Long-range night bomber
- National origin: France
- Manufacturer: Farman
- Number built: 1

History
- First flight: March 1922

The Farman BN.4, or Super Goliath, was a very large 1920s French biplane designed by Farman as a long-range night bomber.

== Development ==
Often known by the military designation BN.4 (Bombardement de Nuit Strategique, 4 places), some sources refer to it as the Super Goliath though that name was also applied to the Farman F.141. It was a four-seat long range night bomber. The company exhibited the BN.4 at the 1921 Paris Salon de l'Aeronautique. The BN.4 was a four-engined three-bay biplane powered by four Lorraine piston engines mounted in tandem pairs on the lower wing. It had a biplane tail unit and a tailskid landing gear with twin-wheel main units. It had provision for a gunner in the nose section and amidships with additional machine guns that fired downwards and to the rear.

By the time the aircraft was test flown a pair of twin nose wheels had been added to stop the aircraft nosing over on soft grass airfields. After the aircraft had performed a number of test flights the military had lost interest in spending on new equipment in the post-war era. A civil version was looked at but it would have been too large and the BN.4 was not ordered into production.

== Specifications ==
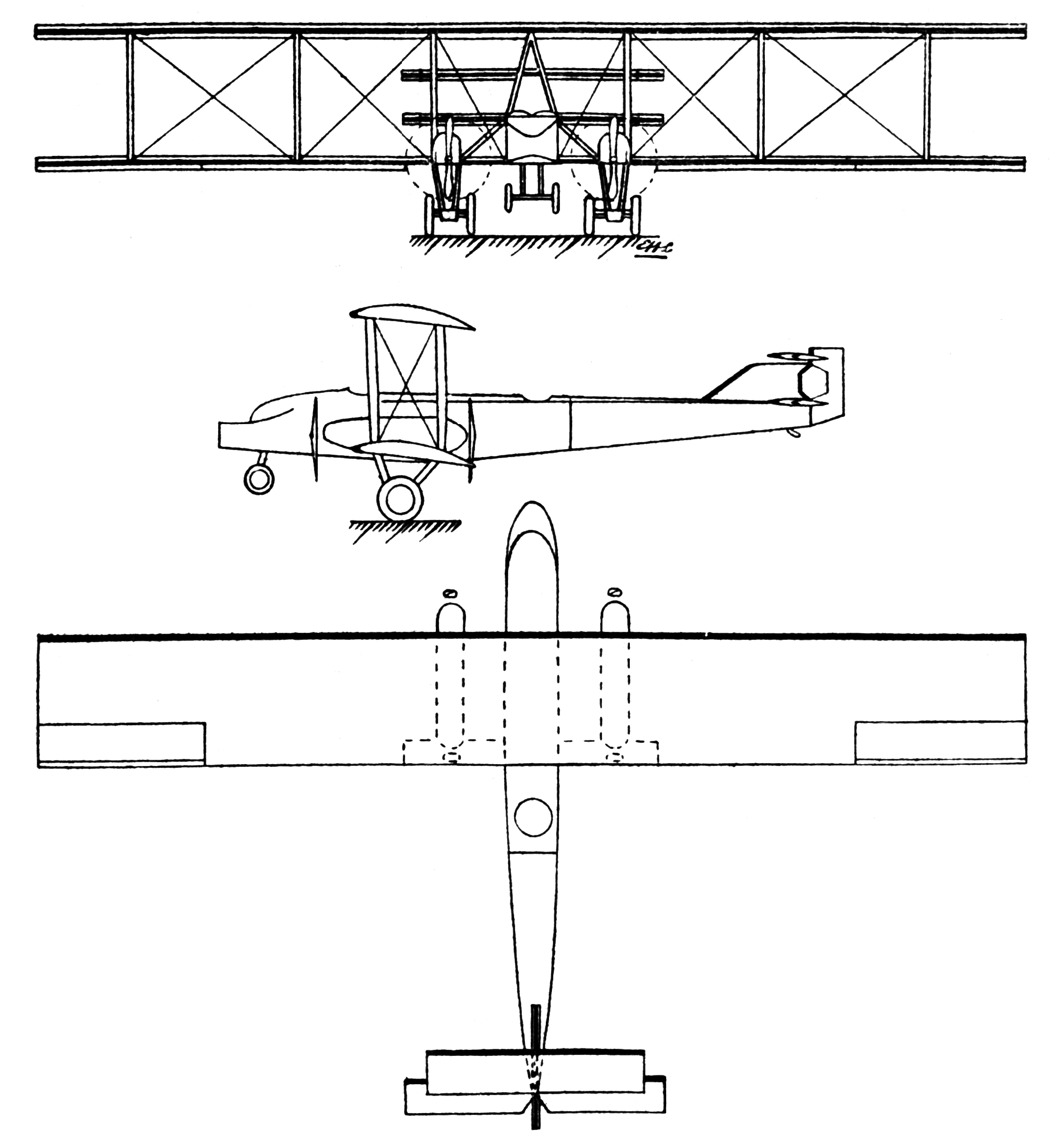
Farman BN.4 3-view drawing from Les Ailes December 8, 1921

Data from

General characteristics

- Length: 21.4 m (70 ft 3 in)
- Wingspan: 32.9 m (107 ft 11 in)
- Height: 7.35 m (24 ft 1 in)
- Wing area: 300 m^{2} (3,200 sq ft)
- Empty weight: 5,500 kg (12,125 lb)
- Gross weight: 10,500 kg (23,149 lb)
- Powerplant: 4 × Lorraine 12D V-12 water-cooled piston engines, 276 kW (370 hp) each

Performance

- Maximum speed: 160 km/h (99 mph, 86 kn)
- Service ceiling: 4,500 m (14,800 ft)

Armament

- Guns: 5 × 7.7 mm (0.303 in) machine guns
- Bombs: up to 2,500 kg (5,500 lb) of bombs
