= Farman F.180 Oiseau Bleu =

F.180 Oiseau Bleu
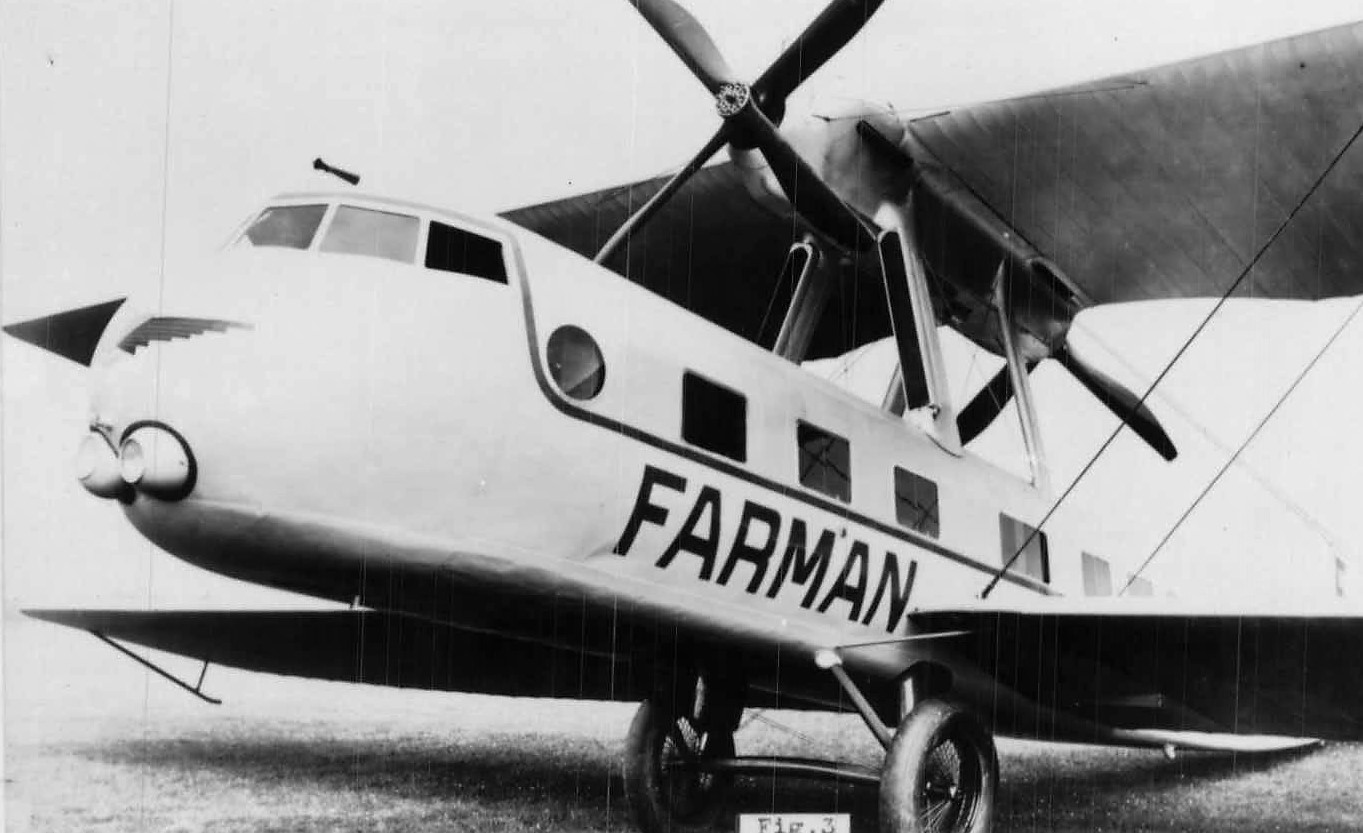

General information
- Type: Biplane airliner
- National origin: France
- Manufacturer: Farman
- Primary user: Farman Line
- Number built: 3

History
- Introduction date: 1928
- First flight: November 1927

The Farman F.180 Oiseau Bleu (en: Bluebird) was a biplane airliner designed and produced by the French aircraft manufacturer Farman.

The F.180 was designed during the mid-1920s to fly long-distance commercial routes. The F.180 had an advanced (for the 1920s) oval-section fuselage with unequal-span, two-bay wings. It had an enclosed cockpit for two crew and a luxury main cabin for 24 passengers. The aircraft was powered by two Farman piston engines mounted in push-pull configuration in tandem beneath the upper wing centre section, which was supported above the fuselage on two pairs of struts. One design flaw was that the undercarriage had a very narrow track main gear wheels for a heavy aircraft, thus producing a rough ride on grass airfields.

At one point, it was even intended for the F.180 to perform transatlantic flights between Paris and New York, however, the planned crossing attempt was cancelled. A total of three aircraft were built as luxurious transports for the company's own airline, Farman Line. They were used to operate routes between Paris and various other European capital cities.

== Development ==
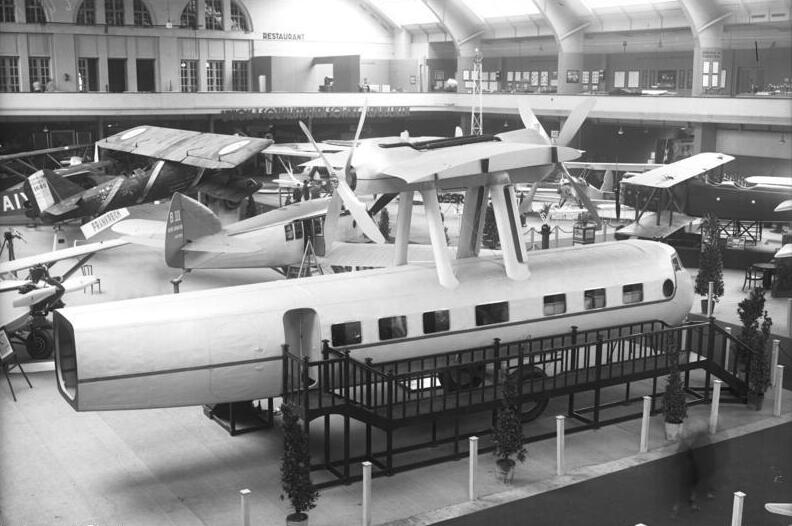
Farman F.180 fuselage and engine mockup at the Berlin Air Show in 1928

Work on what would become the F.180 began at Farman during the mid-1920s; the company's design team decided to pursue an economic aircraft that was suited to being operated on airline's already-established routes, the average distance of which being around 500 km (311 miles) by the late 1920s, while also being suitable for new direct routes between major commercial centres. To this end, the aircraft was designed to fly routes of 500, 1,000, and 1,500 km (311, 821, and 932 miles respectively) while carrying corresponding payloads of 2,500, 2,000, and 1,500 kg (5,512, 4,409 and 3,307 lb. respectively). A further objective of the design team was for the new aircraft to possess improved performance in terms of operational efficiency, passenger comfort, and safety. Accordingly, development of the aircraft was supported by extensive safety research.

During November 1927, the F.180 conducted its maiden flight. The first aircraft was delivered during the following year, shortly thereafter, it was joined by two additional aircraft. All three F.180s remained in airline service for a number of years.

== Design ==
The Farman F.180 was a biplane airliner capable of carrying up to 24 passengers in relatively luxurious conditions while also being reliable and economic to operate. Additionally, it was also equipped to conduct night flights. The biplane configuration of the aircraft featured generously spaced wings supported by a minimal structure, which generated as little structural drag as was possible. Specific elements minimised in comparison to conventional twin-engined biplanes of the era included a reduction of the number of struts used, little use of bracing wire, and the elimination of one engine nacelle. The majority of the aircraft was made out of wood, a design made primarily for economic reasons. The flying characteristics of the aircraft include a favourable lift profile along with a comparatively low wing loading of around 45 kg/m2 (9.22 lh./sq.ft.). The aircraft was claimed to guaranteed to operate under any circumstances, day or night, along a suitably marked route.

The cylindrical-shaped fuselage was designed as such out of efforts to maximise the available internal space for the passenger cabin while also reducing the drag incurred. The exterior covering was made of birch and plywood, which produced relatively little frictional resistance. The structure of the fuselage comprised a framework of longerons distributed across its circumference along with double planking and transverse frames. The undercarriage was deliberately designed to be as low as was feasibly possible, both in order to lower the aircraft's overall center of gravity and to minimise drag. The axles of the undercarriage were supported by a pair of principal struts, each having two telescoping elements, there were braced with two smaller forward-facing struts that were hinged with the fuselage.

The F.180 was powered by a pair of Farman 12 We W-12 piston engines. These engines are positioned in a tandem arrangement along the longitudinal axis of the aircraft, the configuration being a major part of the aircraft's overall look. In the event of a single engine outage, the available power output did not diminish below that which was needed for horizontal flight to be maintained; at the time, it was considered reasonable for a flight to proceed with one engine completely stopped. The placement of the engines positively impacted both vibration and noise levels within the passenger cabin. The engine mount comprised a pair of U-shaped girders to which the engine were bolted to. Care was paid to permitting the easy inspection and quick replacement of the engines and their various accessories.

The passenger cabin of the F.180 was relatively wide and unobstructed by any structural elements, being sufficiently wide to permit rows of three spacious chairs along with a single aisle. For short range flights, the cabin could have up to 25 seats in rows of three, while longer range flights would have a reduced number, either 17 convertible chairs that could transform into couches, or 12 couches (the latter arrangement was typically used for night flights). Optionally, a buffet bar could be installed in place of the middle row of seats. Baggage was held within a dedicated compartment in front of the cabin while an lavatory was at the rear of the cabin; a double wall was present to minimize noise levels.

== Operators ==
France

- Farman Line

== Specifications (F.180) ==
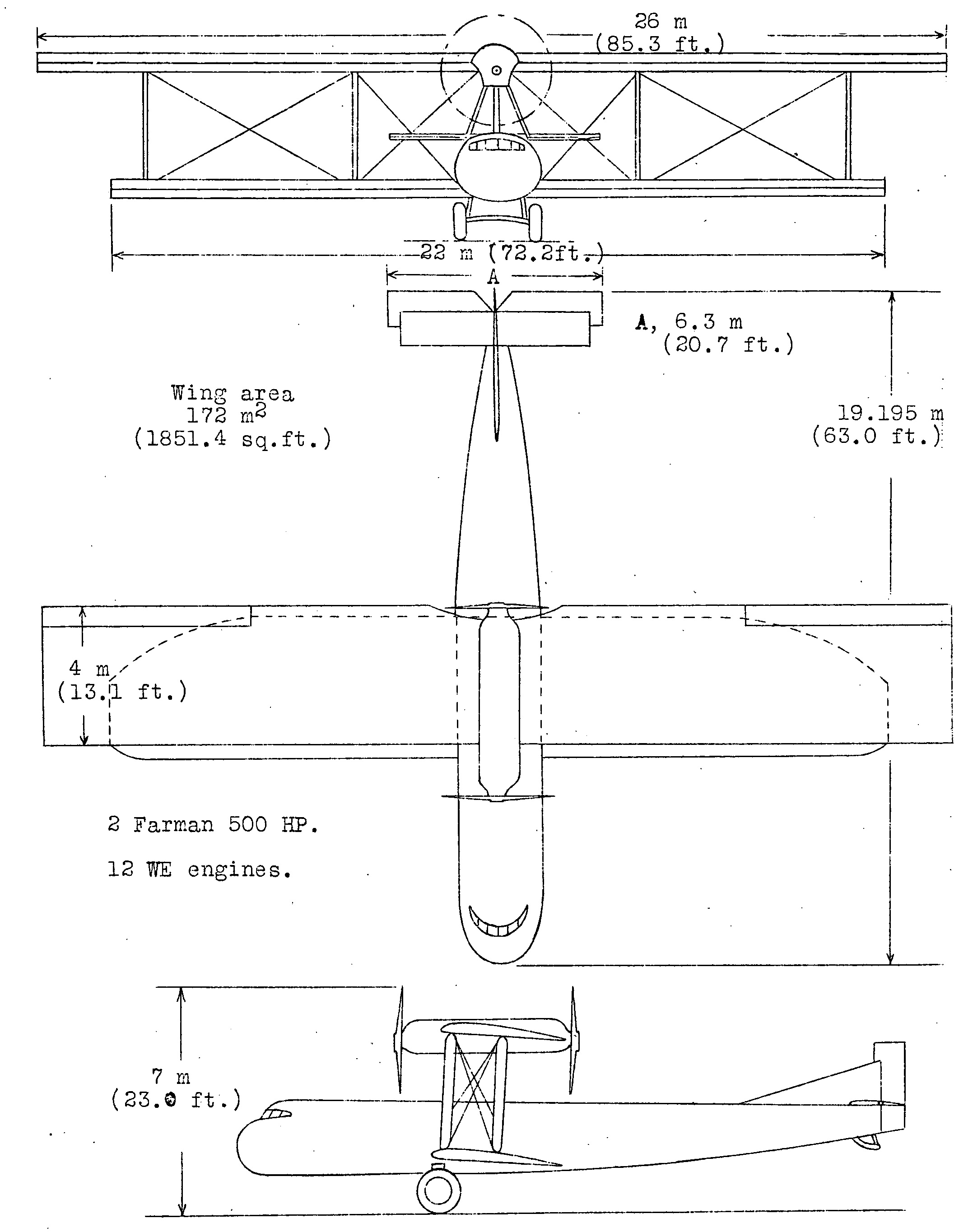
Farman F.180 3-view drawing from NACA Aircraft Circular No.88

Data from The Illustrated Encyclopedia of Aircraft, Farman two-engine commercial biplane F.180 (French)

General characteristics

- Crew: Two (pilot and co-pilot)
- Capacity: 24 passengers
- Length: 18 m (59 ft 0.5 in)
- Wingspan: 26 m (85 ft 3.5 in)
- Height: 5.80 m (19 ft 0.25 in)
- Wing area: 172 m^{2} (1,851.45 sq ft)
- Empty weight: 4,500 kg (9,921 lb)
- Gross weight: 8,000 kg (17,637 lb)
- Powerplant: 2 × Farman 12 We W-12 water-cooled piston engines , 373 kW (500 hp) each

Performance

- Maximum speed: 190 km/h (118 mph, 103 kn)
- Range: 1,000 km (621 mi, 540 nmi)
- Service ceiling: 4,000 m (13,125 ft)
