= Société Générale des Transports Aériens =

French airline (1919–1933)

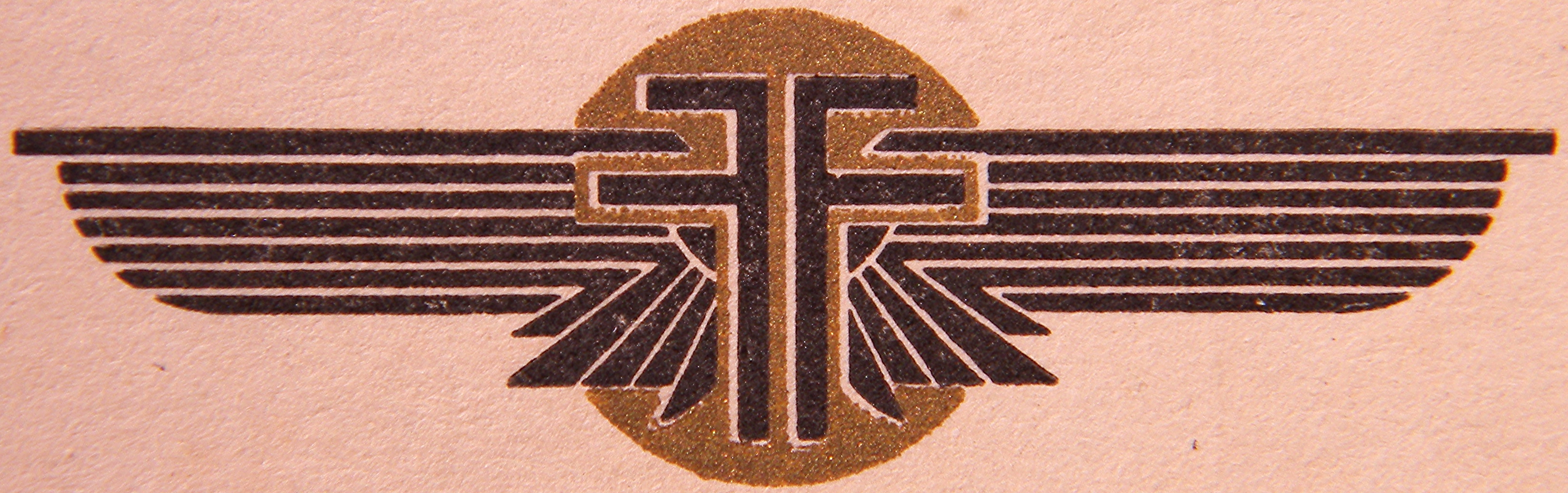

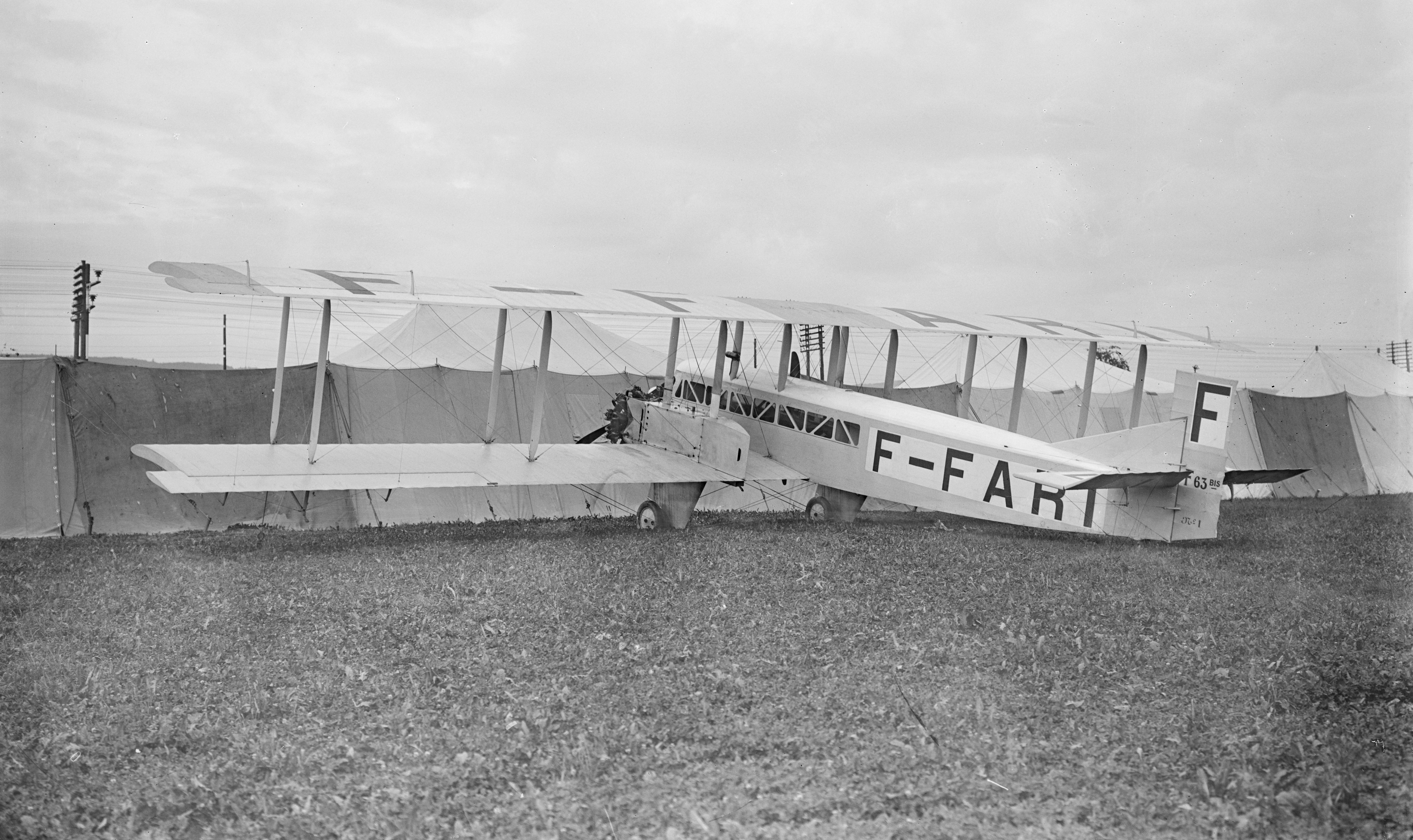
- Farman F.63 bis
IATA	ICAO	Call sign
N/A	N/A	N/A
- Founded: 8 February 1919
- Commenced operations: 22 March 1919
- Ceased operations: 19 May 1933 (merged with Air Orient, Air Union, Aéropostale and CFRNA to form Air France)
- Operating bases: Toussus-le-Noble, Yvelines, France
- Destinations: Croydon, Surrey, United Kingdom Brussels Amsterdam Hamburg Copenhagen Berlin Cologne Frankfurt Leipzig Antwerp Ostend and connections to Scandinavia and Russia
- Headquarters: 167, rue de Silly, Boulogne-Billancourt and, from 1926, 4, rue Edouard-VII, Paris, France
- Key people: Henry, Maurice and Dick FARMAN

The Société Générale des Transports Aériens (SGTA) was a French airline founded in 1919. It operated until 1933 when its assets were incorporated in the newly created Air France airline.

== History ==
Initially known as Lignes Aériennes Farman, was created on February 8, 1919, when a Farman F.60 Goliath flew from Toussus-le-Noble to Kenley, near Croydon. The airline was created by the Farman brothers, who also owned the Farman Aviation Works.

It began a weekly service between Paris and Brussels on 22 March 1919, the world's first international commercial aviation service.

In 1933, all SGTA assets were incorporated in the newly created Air France, and the company ceased to exist.

== Accidents and incidents ==
- On 5 May 1927, Farman F.60 Goliath registered as F-ADFN was lost in the Atlantic Ocean on a flight from Saint-Louis Senegal to Pernambuco, Brazil. Three crewmen were killed.

== Aircraft ==
The airline operated Farman aircraft exclusively, including these types:

- Farman F.60 Goliath - 12-14 passengers
- Farman F.70 - 4 passengers
- Farman F.121 Jabiru - 9 passengers
- Farman F.170 Jabiru - 8 passengers

== See also ==
- List of airlines by foundation date
