= Ludovic Arrachart =

French aviator

Ludovic Arrachart (15 August 1897, Besançon - 24 May 1933, Maisons) was a French aviator.

His long-distance flights made him a pioneer of intercontinental aviation. He notably beat two world records : first flying a Breguet 19 3,166 km (1,967 mi) from Étampes to Villa Cisneros in Africa in February 1925 and flying a Potez 28 4,305 km (2,675 mi) from Paris to Basra in Iraq (in 1926, with his brother Paul) in June 1926.

He enlisted in the French Army at the outbreak of World War I, serving in the 35th Infantry Regiment. Wounded twice, he was promoted to Sergeant in 1916, before being declared unfit for duty in the infantry and transferring to the Armée de l'Air as an observer in 1917, and qualifying as a pilot in 1918. He commanded a squadron based in Alexandretta, Syria, from 1919 to 1922, and was assigned to the Commission trials (1923–25). In June 1924 he won the Michelin Cup long-distance flying competition. He died on 24 May 1933 when his Caudron C.362 suffered an engine failure during preliminary trials for the Coupe Deutsch de la Meurthe.

A street was named after him in the 8th arrondissement of Lyon.
