= Stary Burtyuk =

Stary Burtyuk Старый Буртюк
- Village
- Location within Bashkortostan Location within Russia
- Coordinates: 55°43′N 54°33′E
- Country: Russia
- Region: Bashkortostan
- District: Krasnokamsky District
- Time zone: UTC+5:00

Stary Burtyuk (Russian: Старый Буртюк; Bashkir: Иҫке Бөртөк, İśke Börtök) is a rural locality (a village) in Novoburinsky Selsoviet, Krasnokamsky District, Bashkortostan, Russia. The population was 364 as of 2010. There are 4 streets.

== Geography ==
Stary Burtyuk is located 62 km southeast of Nikolo-Beryozovka (the district's administrative centre) by road. Novy Burtyuk is the nearest rural locality.
