= Potez 28 =

1920s French light aircraft

- Renault powered Potez 28

General information
- Type: Long range record aircraft
- National origin: France
- Manufacturer: Henri Potez
- Number built: 2

History
- First flight: 1926

The Potez 28 was a French aircraft designed in the 1920s to set distance records, built in both sesquiplane and monoplane versions. Only two were completed but both set several long distance records.

== Design and development ==
The Potez 28, known also as the Potez 28/2 or the Potez 28 G.R. (Grands Raids or long distance flights, a standard French description of such types) was a close relative of both the Potez 25 and the Potez 25 G.R., all single engine sesquiplanes. In its original biplane form it was particularly like the latter, though strengthened and somewhat enlarged with an upper wingspan increased by 19% to allow for the weight of extra fuel. Unusually for such a large machine, it was a single bay biplane, with two spar wings. The lower wing was both shorter and narrower (55%) in chord than the upper, resulting in it having only 36% of the area. Pairs of interplane struts leaned outwards and diverged toward the more widely separated upper wing spars. The upper wing was supported over the fuselage by further pairs of outward leaning struts from the upper fuselage, converging to its spars.

The fuselage of the Potez 28 was flat sided, with rounded decking and two open cockpits placed well behind the upper wing. There was a cut-out in the trailing edge of the upper wing to improve the pilot's field of view. Large external supplementary fuel tanks could be carried below the fuselage to extend the range. The sesquiplane was powered by a 410 kW (550 hp) Renault 12Kg engine, driving a two blade propeller. At the rear the fin was small and roughly quadrantal, topped by the horn of the balanced rudder. It had a fixed tail wheel undercarriage with single main wheels mounted on vertical, streamlined, shock absorbing legs attached to the lower fuselage. These were hinged on trailing struts to the outer lower fuselage and on inner struts to its central lower underside.

The first Potez 28 was first flown in the first half of 1926.

A second Potez 28 was built, powered by a 500 hp (370 kW) W-12 configuration Farman 12We engine. The three cylinder banks each had their own cowlings. During 1927 it was converted into a monoplane, with a parasol wing with an area of 63 m^{2} (678 sq ft), almost the same as the biplane. Its wing had a straight leading edge but there was straight taper on the trailing edges of the outer panels. The crew of two were now enclosed under a long, continuous canopy. It was test flown in May 1927.

== Operational history ==
The Potez 28 and 28M were built to compete with the Breguet 19 GR over long distances. The Renault engined machine set a new world distance record with a flight from Paris to Basra, piloted by the brothers Ludovic and Paul Arrachart. Leaving Paris on 26 June they landed at RAF Shaibah, a few kilometers from Basra, with a broken fuel pipe, having covered a distance of 4,313 km (2,680 mi) in 26 hours 30 min.

The Potez 28M set six speed, distance and duration records whilst carrying loads of 500 kg (1,102 lb) and 1,000 kg (2,205 lb) over distances between 500–2,000 km (311–1,243 mi). It was lost during the take-off for a record attempt, a flight from Etampes to Siberia, when the weight caused a tyre to burst; the pilots escaped unhurt.

== Variants ==
Potez 28 G.R.
Sesquiplanes, one powered by a Renault 12Kg V-12 engine and the second by a Farman 12We engine and fitted with oil coolers on the fuselage sides.
Potez 28/2

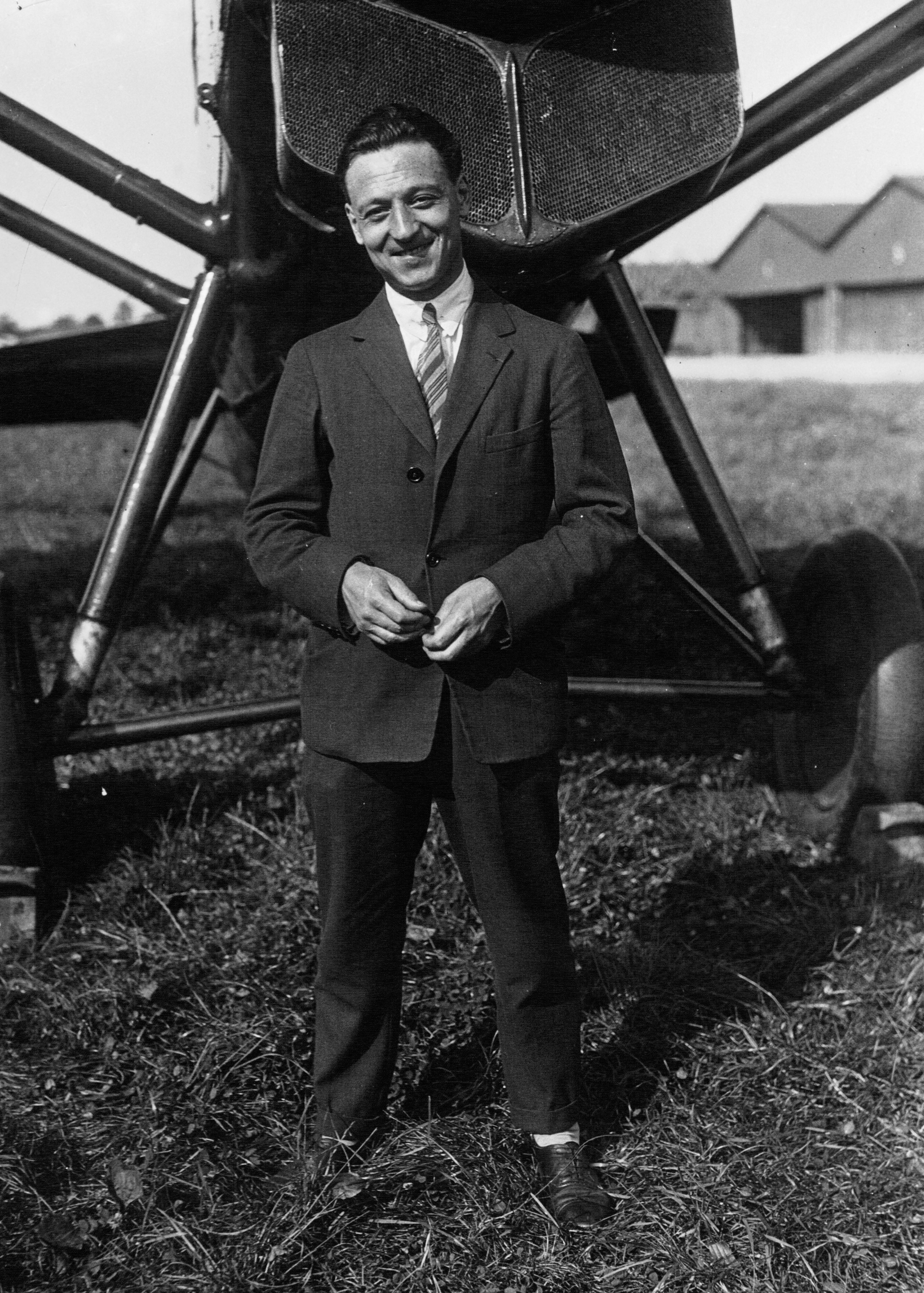
Lionel de Marmier in front of the sole Potez 28M

Potez 28M
Parasol wing monoplane conversion of the second aircraft, powered by the Farman 12We engine.

== Specifications (Biplane, Renault engine) ==
Data from Flight, 2 December 1926

General characteristics

- Crew: Two
- Length: 11.0 m (36 ft 1 in)
- Upper wingspan: 16.20 m (53 ft 2 in)
- Height: 4.10 m (13 ft 5 in)
- Wing area: 46.40 m^{2} (499.4 sq ft) upper wing; lower wing 16.60 m^{2} (178.7 sq ft)
- Empty weight: 1,900 kg (4,189 lb)
- Gross weight: 4,770 kg (10,516 lb)
- Fuel capacity: 3,400 L (748 imp gal; 898 US gal)
- Powerplant: 1 × Renault 12Kg V-12, 410 kW (550 hp)
- Propellers: 2-bladed

Performance

- Maximum speed: 210 km/h (130 mph, 110 kn) with half load
- Range: 2,500 km (1,600 mi, 1,300 nmi)
- Service ceiling: 5,200 m (17,100 ft) with half load; 2,500 m (8,202 ft) with full load
