= Farman F.170 Jabiru =

F.170 Jabiru
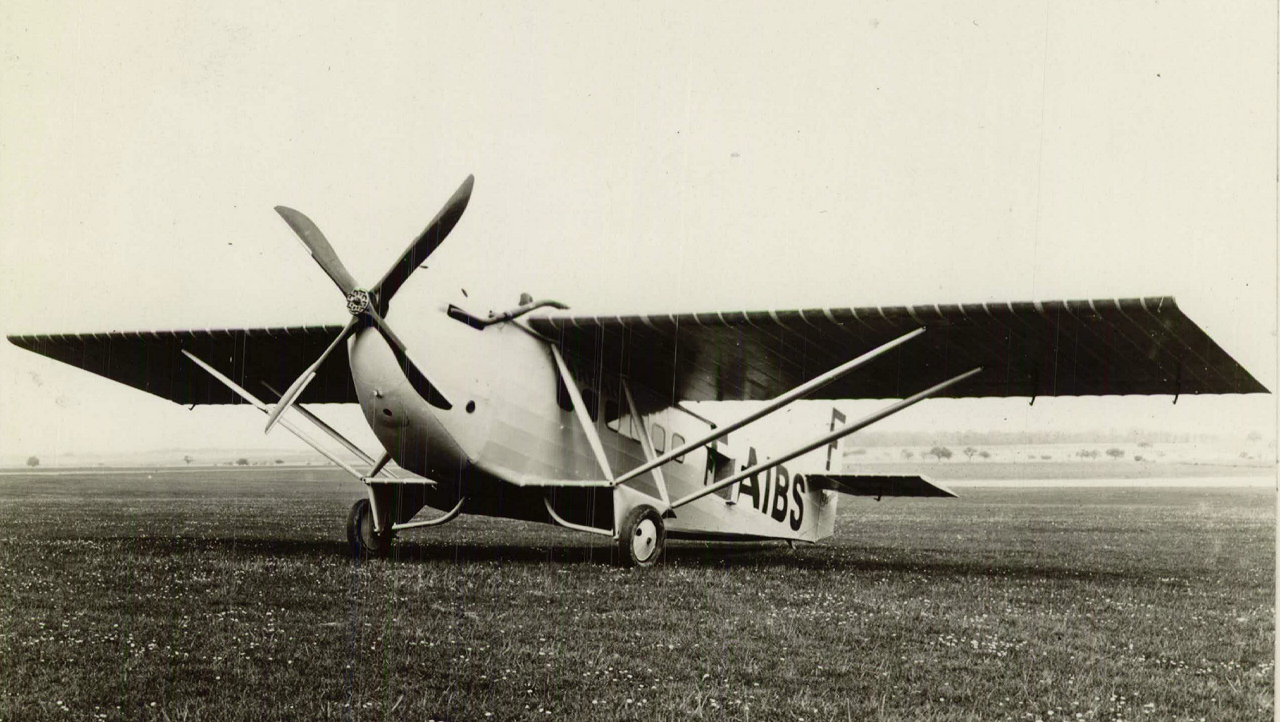

General information
- Type: airliner
- Manufacturer: Farman
- Number built: 18

History
- Manufactured: 1925-1929
- First flight: 1925

The Farman F.170 Jabiru was a single-engine sesquiplane airliner designed and built by the French aircraft company Farman Aviation Works. It is a derivative of the F.121 Jabiru.

The F.170 could carry up to eight passengers and had a somewhat ungainly appearance. Since the aircraft was quite low on its wheels, it was often derisively called the ventre-à-terre (belly to the ground). The maiden flight took place in 1925.

== Development ==
The F.170 Jabiru was a single-engine evolution of the 1923 F.3X/F.121. During the early 1920s, there was a strong preference amongst operators for single-engine airliners. Since even multi-engine aircraft could not keep flying in the (likely) event of a mid-flight engine failure, it was considered that a single engine offered just as much security while offering a greater ease of maintenance. At the time, Farman's engines were held in high regard, having demonstrated their endurance with multiple record-breaking flights (during 145, one aircraft equipped with a Farman engine was able to fly continuously for 45 hours.

Farman's design team prioritised the achievement of a high level of flight efficiency, which would permit the aircraft to travel at relatively high speeds while carrying heavy payloads while requiring the minimal amount of engine power and fuel capacity. Furthermore, the F.170 was designed to be as economic as possible from an operational perspective.

The improved F.170bis, which was introduced in 1927, incorporated some metal construction and could carry up to nine passengers. The F.171bis was joined by the one and only F.171.

== Design ==
The Farman F.170 Jabiru was a single-engine sesquiplane airliner. It possessed relatively favourable flight qualities, particularly in terms of its range of speed and manoeuvrability, while contributed to overall safety. The aircraft was also relatively durable for the era, in part due to its materials having been carefully selected; extensive measures were taken to protect against fire hazards, including the isolation of engine components, the positioning of the fuel tanks, the adoption of a metal engine bed, the provision of fire extinguishers, and rapid draining facilities. To minimise noise within the aircraft, particularly the passenger cabin, two lengthy exhaust pipes extended to the rear of the aircraft.

The forward section of the fuselage's interior contains the engine bay and the cockpit; the pilot being fully insulated from both the engine and the passenger cabin, even being provided with a separate door for exiting and entering the aircraft. The main cabin was relatively spacious for the era, being 1.1m (3.6 ft.) wide by 1.8 m (5.9 ft.) high, its base being very near to the ground, which eased access. It was often comfortably furnished, being occupied by eight seats in a standard configuration. The sides of the cabin were lined with large windows that permitted the passengers to have an unobstructed view of the landscape below. Passengers were able to regulate the climate of the cabin, somewhat, via the use of a series of trap doors, the opening and closing of which altering the rate of aeration; other passenger convenience features included a hot-water heating system. The baggage compartment was located directly behind the cabin; it was accessed via a separate door.

The F.170 is powered by a single Farman 12 We 12-cylinder engine, which is installed at the front of the aircraft on an easily-removable metal bed. The engine drove, via a 2:1 reduction gear, a four-bladed tractor propeller. Unusually, cooling was achieved via a honeycomb radiator unit located at the rear of the fuselage; this permitted a cleaner shaped engine hood. For ease of inspection and maintenance, the engine hood could be quickly removed in its entirety. To start the engine, an electric starter could be used by the pilot at any moment. Typically, the engine would have been operated at a moderate speed while the excess power capacity of the engine remained available to the pilot for occasional use, such as when the aircraft was flying close to the ground. While carrying 370 kg (816 lb.) of fuel and a payload of 850 kg, it was capable of flying non-stop for up to five hours, traversing roughly 900 km (560 miles) during this time.

The F.170 had a semi-thick wing, which was rigidly braced using a series of oblique struts that were indirectly secured to the base of the fuselage. This wing, which was integrated into the top of the fuselage, had a perfectly rectangular shape and a uniform cross-section; this latter attribute eased construction as it permitted the use of uniform ribs across its entire length. It was furnished with unbalanced ailerons that were actuated via a series of externally-ran wooden horns. The wing was primarily composed of wood which the covering was fabric. The empennage was equipped with a two-part unbalanced elevator and a balanced rudder.

A relatively wide undercarriage was used. The main legs were located between the wing struts at the outer portions of the small plane secured to the base of the fuselage; both the axles and shock absorbers were streamlined by this plane. A robust tail skid was mounted underneath the fuselage in line with the leading edge of the vertical stabiliser.

== Variants ==
F.170
An 8-passenger sesquiplane powered by a 370 kW (500 hp) Farman 12 We engine, 13 built.
F.170bis
9-passenger airliner; an F.170 incorporating some metal construction, four built.
F.171
A long-range derivative developed for a crossing of the North Atlantic, one built.

== Operational history ==
The F.170 and F.170bis were used exclusively by Société Générale des Transports Aériens (SGTA) from May 1926 and used on the Paris-Cologne-Berlin route. When the SGTA was incorporated in the newly created Air France airline on 7 October 1933, some five F.170 were still being used.

== Operators ==
France

- Air France
- Société Générale des Transports Aériens

== Specifications (F.170) ==
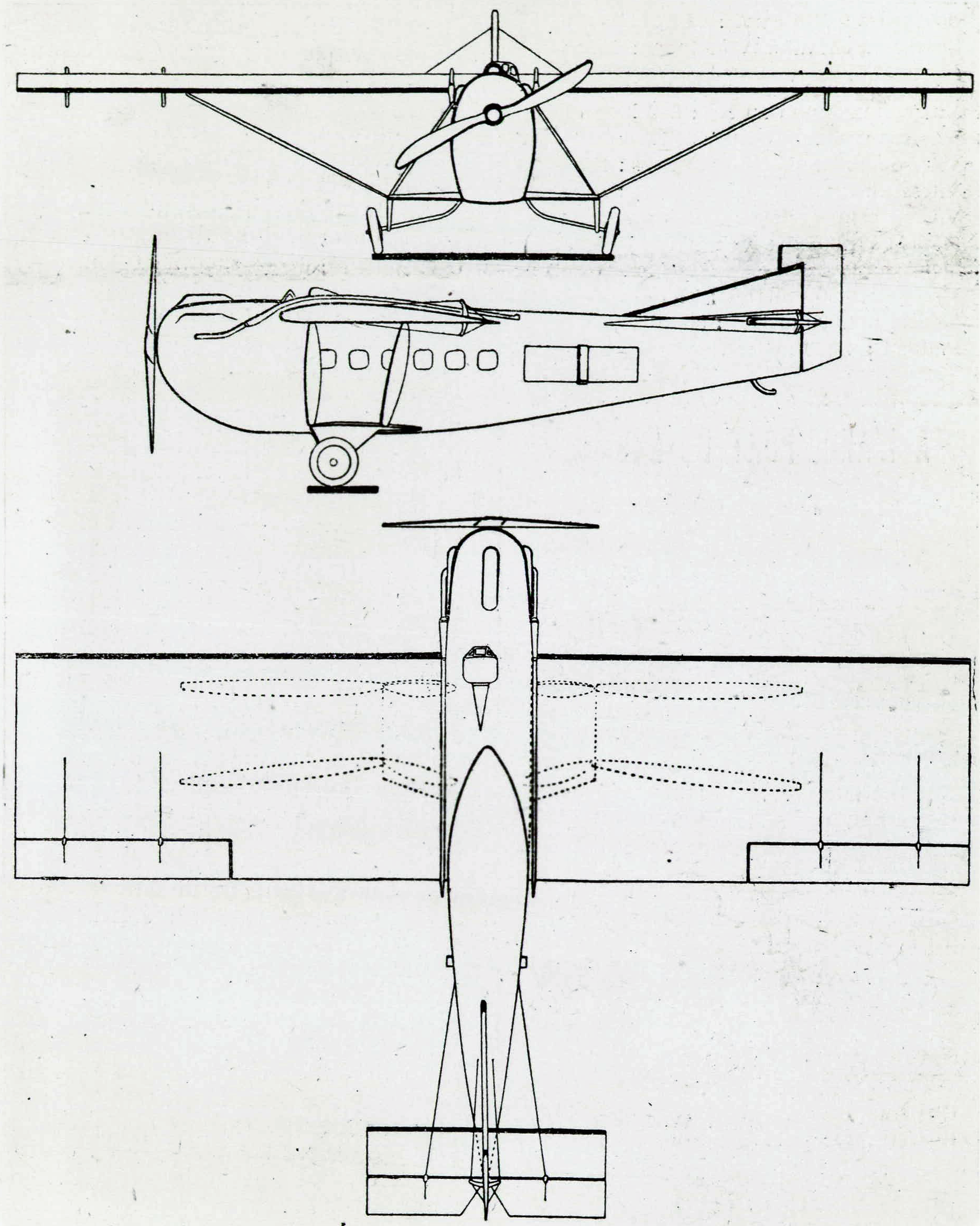
Farman F.170 3 view drawing from NACA Aircraft Circular No.12

Data from Jane's all the World's Aircraft 1928, Histoire Mondiale des Avions de Ligne Aviafrance: Farman F-170

General characteristics

- Crew: 1
- Capacity: 8
- Length: 11.75 m (38 ft 7 in)
- Wingspan: 16.1 m (52 ft 10 in)
- Height: 3.2 m (10 ft 6 in)
- Wing area: 52.5 m^{2} (565 sq ft)
- Empty weight: 1,800 kg (3,968 lb)
- Gross weight: 3,200 kg (7,055 lb)
- Powerplant: 1 × Farman 12 We W-12 water-cooled piston engine, 370 kW (500 hp)
- Propellers: 4-bladed wooden fixed-pitch propeller

Performance

- Maximum speed: 220 km/h (140 mph, 120 kn)
- Cruise speed: 180 km/h (110 mph, 97 kn)
- Range: 500 km (310 mi, 270 nmi)
- Service ceiling: 4,500 m (14,800 ft)
- Time to altitude: 2,000 m (6,600 ft) in 15 minutes
- Wing loading: 61 kg/m^{2} (12 lb/sq ft)
- Power/mass: 0.1174 kW/kg (0.0714 hp/lb)

== Bibliography ==
- Liron, Jean (1984). Les avions Farman. Collection Docavia. Vol. 21. Paris, France: Éditions Larivière. OCLC 37146471.
- "Farman Monoplane F.170 : Commercial Airplane with One 500 HP. Farman Engine." National Advisory Committee for Aeronautics, 1 August 1926. NACA-AC-12, 93R18272.
