= List of accidents and incidents involving airliners in the United Kingdom =

This list of accidents and incidents on airliners in the United Kingdom summarises airline accidents that occurred within the territories claimed by the United Kingdom (UK), with information on airline company with flight number, date, and cause.

This list is a subset of the list of accidents and incidents involving airliners by location; it is also available:

- grouped by year as List of accidents and incidents involving commercial aircraft
- grouped by airline
- in alphabetical order

For alternative, more exhaustive lists, see:

- Bureau of Aircraft Accidents Archives
- Aviation Safety Network

== 1920s ==
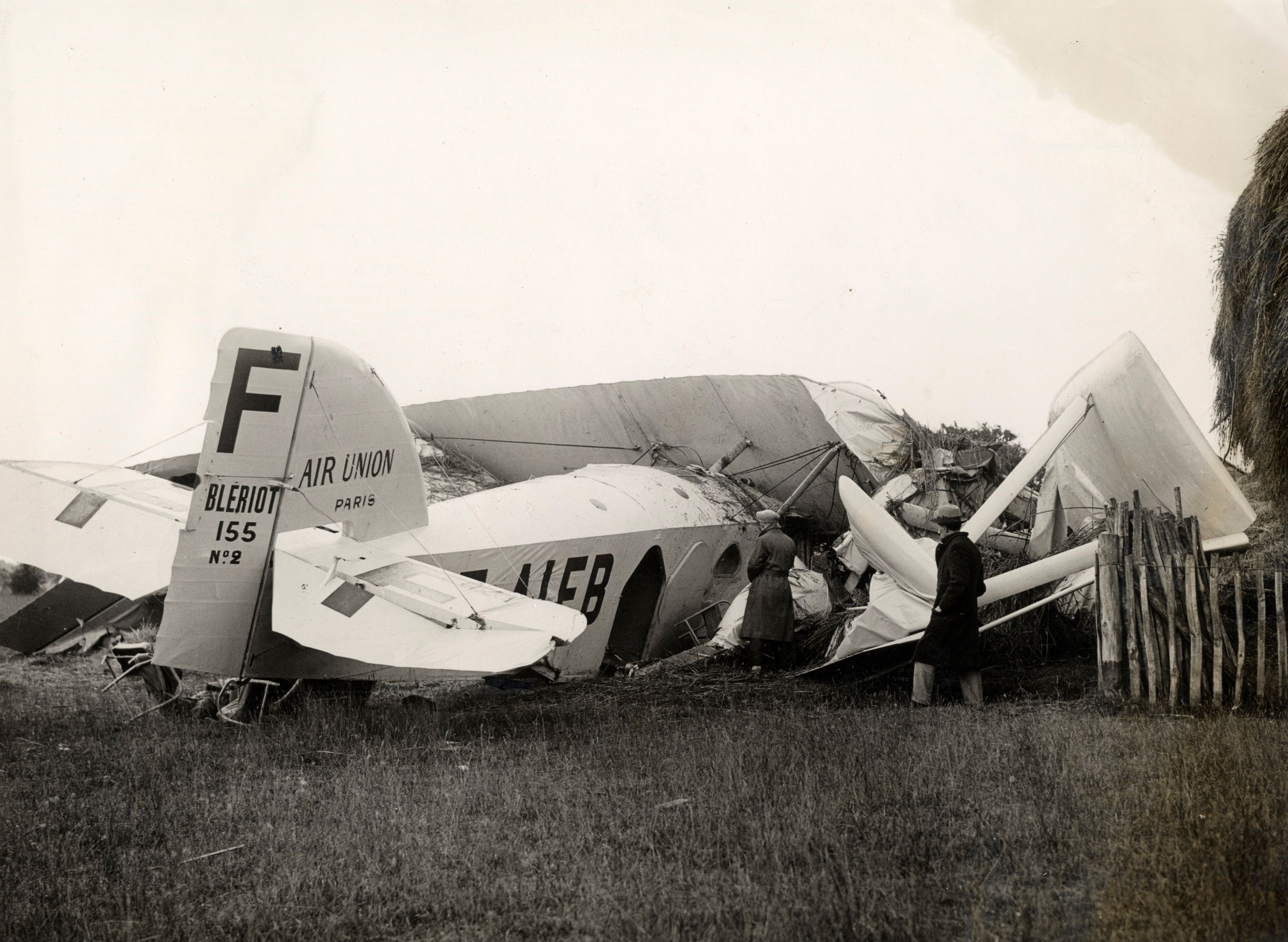
Wreckage of the August 1926 Air Union crash

- 14 December 1920 – a Handley Page Transport Handley Page O/400 crashed on take-off from Cricklewood Aerodrome on a scheduled flight from London to Paris. Two crew and two of the six passengers were killed.
- 27 August 1923 – a Farman F.60 Goliath of Air Union crashed at East Malling, Kent following the failure of an engine and passengers misunderstanding an instruction to move aft, affecting the aircraft's centre of gravity. One of the thirteen people on board was killed.
- 14 September 1923 – a Daimler Airway de Havilland DH.34 crashed near Ivinghoe, Buckinghamshire, killing all five on board.
- 24 April 1924 – a Fokker F.III of KLM departed Lympne for Rotterdam and Amsterdam and was never heard of again. It was presumed to have crashed into the sea, killing the pilot and both passengers.
- 24 December 1924 – an Imperial Airways de Havilland DH.34 crashed shortly after take-off from Croydon Airport, killing all eight on board.
- 18 August 1926 – an Air Union Blériot 155 crashed at Hurst, Kent whilst attempting a forced landing due to engine failure. Of the 15 passengers and crew on board, the pilot and two passengers were killed.
- 2 October 1926 – an Air Union Blériot 155 crashed at Leigh, Kent following a mid-air fire. All seven passengers and crew were killed.
- 22 August 1927 – a KLM Fokker F.VIII, was on a flight from Croydon to Amsterdam when control of the aircraft was lost after the failure of the tailfin. The aircraft crashed into a tree at Underriver, Kent killing one of the eleven people on board.
- 13 July 1928 – a Vickers Vulcan of Imperial Airways, conducting a test flight from Croydon Airport with a pilot and five passengers on board, crashed near Purley, Surrey, with the loss of four passengers. As a result of the crash Imperial Airways stopped the flying of staff (so called joy rides) on test flights.
- 17 June 1929 – an Imperial Airways Handley Page W.10 crashed into the English Channel near Dungeness killing 7 out of 13 on board.
- 6 November – a Deutsche Luft Hansa Junkers G 31 crashed into trees at Godstone, Surrey. 6 of the 7 people on board were killed, including Prince Eugen of Schaumburg-Lippe, who was a member of the crew; aviator and race-car driver Glen Kidston was the only survivor.

== 1930s ==
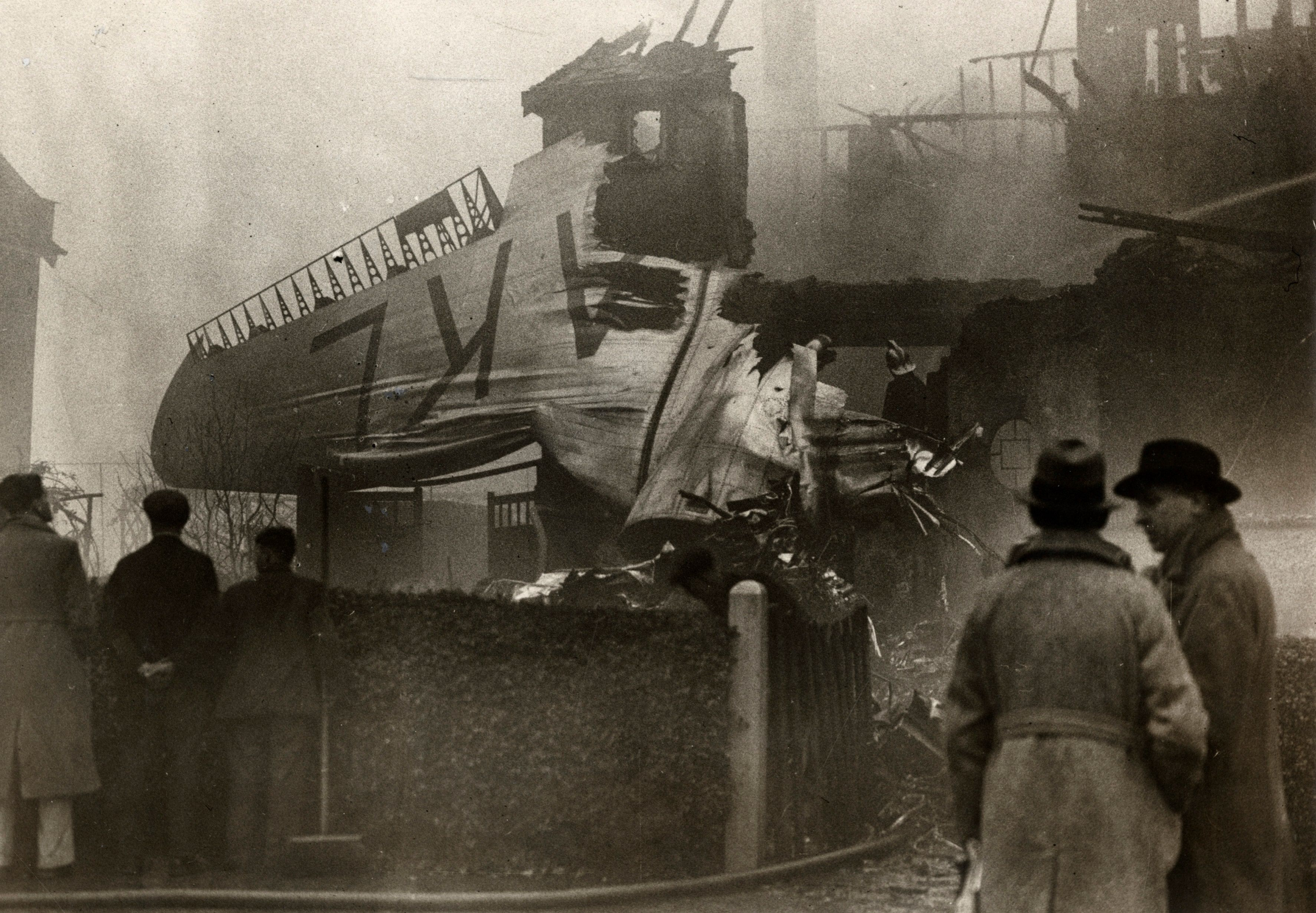
Wreckage of the 1936 KLM crash

- 10 February 1930 – a Farman F.63 Goliath of Air Union crashed at Marden Airfield, Kent following structural failure of the starboard elevator. Of the 6 people on board, 2 passengers were killed.
- 21 July 1930 – a Walcot Air Line Junkers F13 crashed at Meopham, Kent; all 6 on board were killed.
- 9 May 1934 – a Wibault 282T-12 of Air France crashed into the sea off Dungeness, Kent, killing all 6 people on board.
- 2 October 1934 – a de Havilland DH.89A Dragon Rapide of Hillman's Airways crashed into the sea off Folkestone, Kent, killing all 7 people on board.
- 10 December 1935 – a Sabena Savoia-Marchetti S.73 crashed at Tatsfield, Surrey while on approach to Croydon; all 4 crew and 7 passengers were killed.
- 9 December 1936 – a KLM Douglas DC-2 crashed into a house shortly after take-off from Croydon Airport. Amongst the fifteen people killed were autogyro inventor Juan de la Cierva, and former Prime Minister of Sweden Arvid Lindman; two crew members were the only survivors.
- 4 November 1938 – a Jersey Airways de Havilland Express crashed at Saint Brélade, Jersey shortly after take-off on a flight from Jersey Airport; all 13 people on board were killed as well as 1 person on the ground.

== 1940s ==
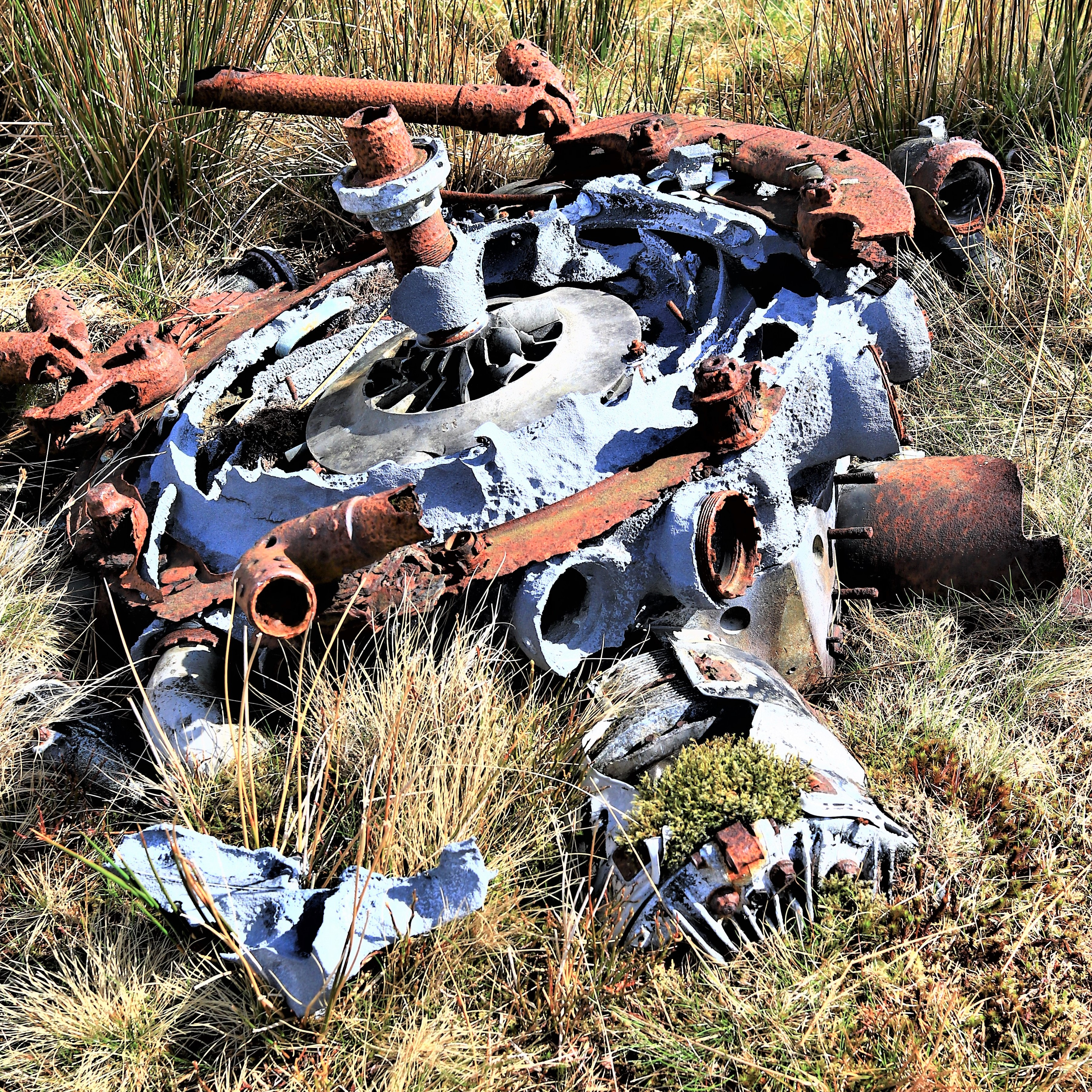
Wreckage of British European Airways Flight S200P, still at the crash site in 2022

- 19 December 1946 – a Railway Air Services Douglas Dakota crashed after takeoff from Northolt Airport. No fatalities occurred.
- 11 January 1947 – a Douglas Dakota of BOAC crashed at Stowting, Kent; 8 out of 16 on board were killed.
- 25 January 1947 – a Douglas C-47A operated by Spencer Airways failed to get airborne from Croydon Airport and crashed into a parked aircraft, killing 12 of the 23 on board.
- 2 March 1948 – a Sabena Douglas DC-3 crashed at Heathrow Airport, killing 20 of the 22 people on board.
- 21 April 1948 – British European Airways Flight S200P, a Vickers Viking, crashed into a mountain in Ayrshire, Scotland. Nobody was killed but the aircraft was destroyed.
- 4 July 1948 – the Northwood mid-air collision occurred when a Scandinavian Airlines System Douglas DC-6 and a Royal Air Force Avro York collided in mid-air over Northwood, London killing all 39 people on board both aircraft.
- 20 October 1948 – a KLM Lockheed 049 Constellation crashed on approach to Glasgow Prestwick Airport. Due to the crew's reliance on a combination of erroneous charts and incomplete weather forecasts, the aircraft was inadvertently flown into terrain near the airport. All 40 people on board were killed.
- 19 February 1949 – the 1949 Exhall mid-air collision occurred when a British European Airways Douglas Dakota and a Royal Air Force Avro Anson VV243 collided in mid-air near Exhall, Warwickshire. All 14 on both aircraft were killed.
- 19 August 1949 – a British European Airways Douglas Dakota crashed near Ringway Airport, Manchester. Out of the 32 people on board 8 survived.

== 1950s ==
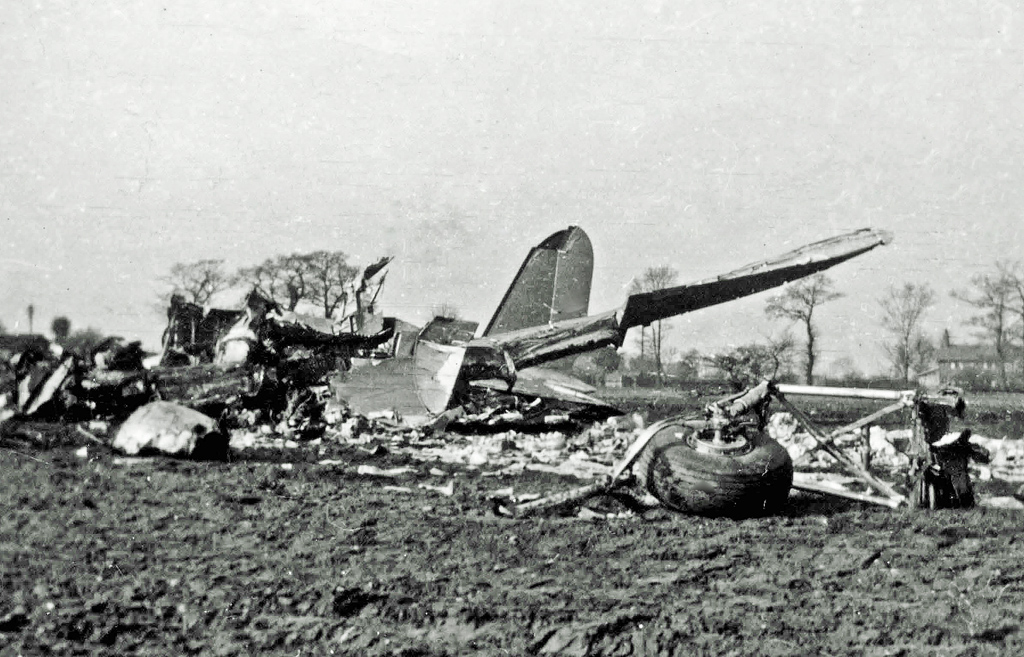
Wreckage of the Air Transport International crash at Ringway in 1951

- 12 March 1950 – a Fairflight Avro Tudor stalled and crashed at Llandow, Glamorganshire, killing 80 of the 83 people on board.
- 31 October 1950 – a British European Airways Vickers Viking crashed on landing at London Heathrow Airport, killing 28 of the 30 people on board.
- 27 March 1951 – Air Transport Charter Douglas Dakota crashed shortly after take-off from Ringway Airport, Manchester, killing 4 of the 6 people on board.
- 10 January 1952 – an Aer Lingus Douglas C-47 lost control and crashed near Llyn Gwynant, killing all 23 on board.
- 5 January 1953 – a BEA Vickers Viking crashed on approach to Nutts Corner Airport, Belfast. 27 of the 35 people on board were killed.
- 19 June 1954 – a Swissair Convair CV-240 ditched in the English Channel near Folkestone due to fuel exhaustion, killing 3 passengers out of 9 passengers and crew.
- 25 December 1954 – a BOAC Boeing 377 Stratocruiser crashed on landing at Prestwick Airport, Glasgow, killing 28 of the 36 people on board.
- 14 March 1957 – British European Airways Flight 411, a Vickers Viscount crashed on approach to Ringway Airport, Manchester, killing all 20 people on board and a further 2 on the ground.
- 1 May 1957 – an Eagle Airlines Vickers Viking crashed on take-off from Blackbushe Airport, killing 34 of the 35 people on board.
- 5 November 1957 – a prototype Bristol Britannia crashed at Downend, killing all 15 on board.
- 15 November 1957 – an Aquila Airways Short Solent crashed at Chessel Down, Isle of Wight, killing 45 of the 58 people on board.
- 15 January 1958 – a Channel Airways de Havilland DH.104 Dove crashed on approach to Ferryfield Airport, Lydd, Kent due to a double engine failure caused by mismanagement of the fuel system. All 7 people on board survived.
- 27 February 1958 – a Manx Airlines Bristol Freighter crashed into Winter Hill in the Pennines in bad weather, killing 35 passengers. The weather that night was so severe that no one working in the nearby ITA transmitting station was aware of the crash.
- 2 September 1958 – an Independent Air Travel Vickers Viking crashed at Southall, Middlesex killing all 3 people on board and a further 4 on the ground.
- 24 December 1958 – a British Overseas Airways Corporation Bristol Britannia on an airworthiness test flight from London Heathrow Airport hit a hill obscured by fog north of Christchurch, Hampshire. 9 people were killed.
- 17 February 1959 – a Turkish Airlines Vickers Viscount crashed at Newdigate, Surrey whilst on approach to Gatwick Airport. 14 of the 24 people on board were killed.

== 1960s ==
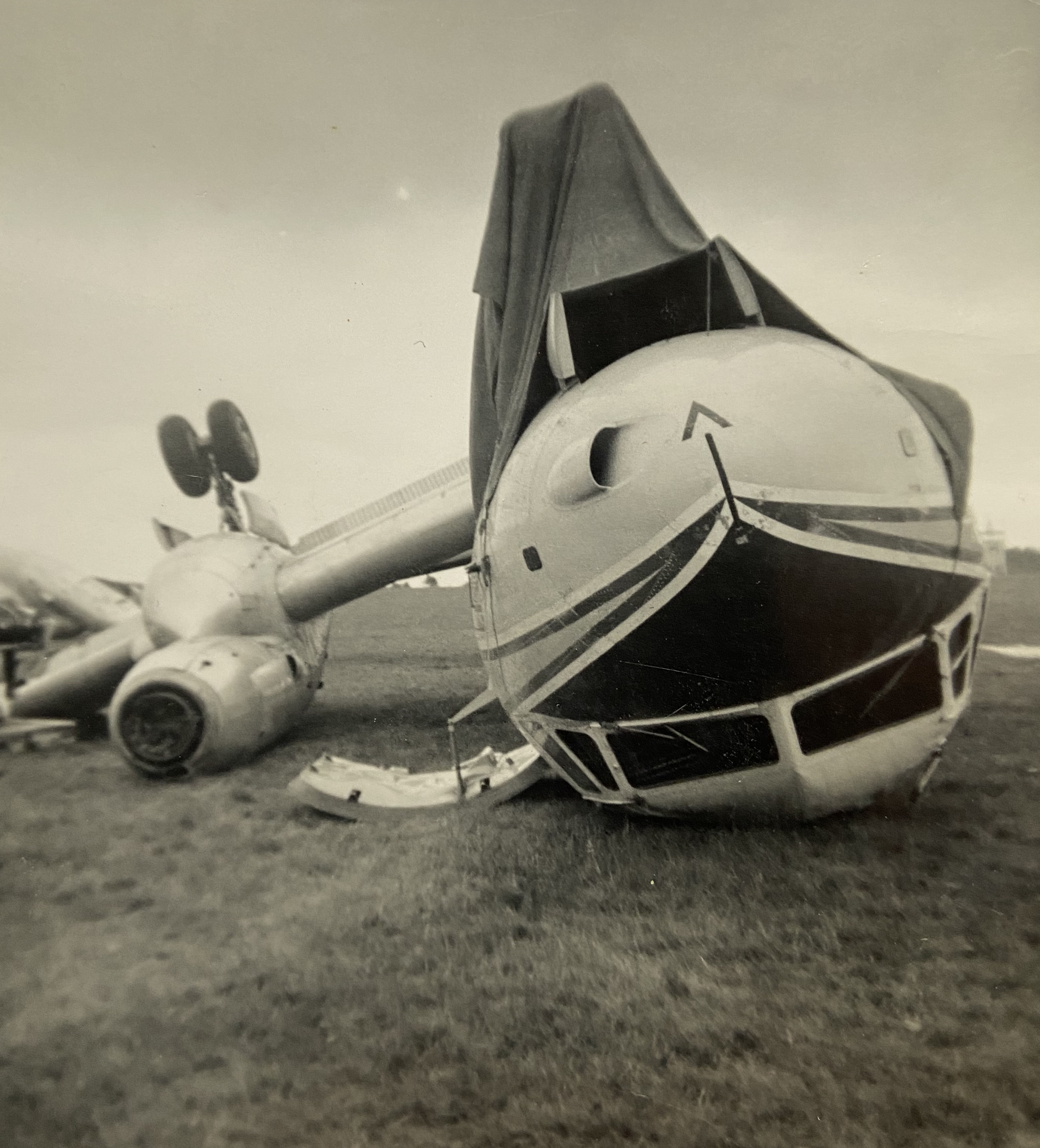
Wreckage of the 1965 Skyways Coach-Air crash

- 6 May 1962 – a Channel Airways Douglas C-47A crashed at St Boniface Down, Isle of Wight, killing 13 of the 18 people on board.
- 22 October 1963 – the prototype BAC One-Eleven crashed at Chicklade, Wiltshire during a test flight when it entered a deep stall. All 7 on board were killed.
- 14 April 1965 – British United Airways Flight 1030X, a Douglas C-47B, crashed on landing at Jersey Airport, Channel Islands. There was only one survivor of the 27 people on board.
- 11 July 1965 – an Avro 748 of Skyways Coach-Air crashed on landing at Lympne Airport. No fatalities occurred.
- 20 July 1965 – a Cambrian Airways Vickers Viscount crashed on approach to Speke Airport, Liverpool, killing both on board and 2 more on the ground.
- 27 October 1965 – a BEA Vickers Vanguard crashed on approach to Heathrow Airport, killing all 36 people on board.
- 3 July 1966 – a Hawker Siddeley Trident 1C crashed on a test flight at Felthorpe, Norfolk after entering an unrecoverable deep stall. All 4 crew were killed.
- 4 June 1967 – a British Midland Airways Canadair C-4 Argonaut crashed at Stockport while on approach to Ringway Airport, Manchester, following fuel starvation. 72 of the 84 people on board were killed.
- 4 November 1967 – Iberia Flight 062, a Sud Aviation Caravelle, crashed at Blackdown Hill, West Sussex, killing all 37 people on board.
- 8 April 1968 – BOAC Flight 712, a Boeing 707-465, sustained an engine fire on take-off from Heathrow Airport. The engine fell off in flight but the fire could not be extinguished. An emergency landing was made at Heathrow, but four people were killed in the subsequent fire. Stewardess Barbara Jane Harrison was awarded a posthumous George Cross for her actions in the accident.
- 3 July 1968 – BKS Air Transport Flight C.6845, an Airspeed Ambassador, crashed on landing at Heathrow Airport. The aircraft collided with two de Havilland Tridents before ending up embedded in Terminal 1, which was then under construction. 6 people were killed on board.
- 5 January 1969 – Ariana Afghan Airlines Flight 701, a Boeing 727-113C, crashed whilst on approach to Gatwick Airport, killing 50 of the 62 people on board, as well as 2 people on the ground.

== 1970s ==
- 6 September 1970 – As part of the Dawson's Field hijackings, El Al Flight 219, a Boeing 707, was subject to an attempted hijacking over the English Channel, which failed due to the actions of the crew and a security agent on board. The aircraft then made an emergency landing at London Heathrow Airport. The same day, Pan Am Flight 93, a Boeing 747, was hijacked over Scotland and subsequently flown to Cairo.
- 18 June 1972 – British European Airways Flight 548, a Hawker Siddeley Trident, entered a deep stall shortly after take-off from London Heathrow Airport and crashed near Staines, killing all 118 people on board. As of 2026, this remains the deadliest accident involving a civil aircraft in the United Kingdom.
- 18 April 1974 – Court Line Flight 95, a BAC One-Eleven, collided with a Piper PA-23 Aztec during take-off from Luton Airport. The Aztec had entered the active runway without permission. The pilot of the Aztec was killed and his passenger was injured. The One-Eleven aborted its take-off and an emergency evacuation was performed with all 93 people on board escaping uninjured.
- 23 July 1974 – a bomb was found on board a British Airways Hawker Siddeley Trident. The aircraft made an emergency landing at Manchester Airport with no casualties. The Provisional IRA claimed they planted the bomb as a symbolic gesture, and that it wasn't intended to explode.
- 17 March 1977 – a British Airtours Boeing 707 crashed on a training flight at Glasgow Prestwick Airport. None of the 4 crew on board were killed.
- 31 July 1979 – Dan-Air Flight 0034, a Hawker Siddeley HS 748, crashed on take-off from Sumburgh Airport, Shetland Islands. 17 of the 44 people on board were killed.

== 1980s ==
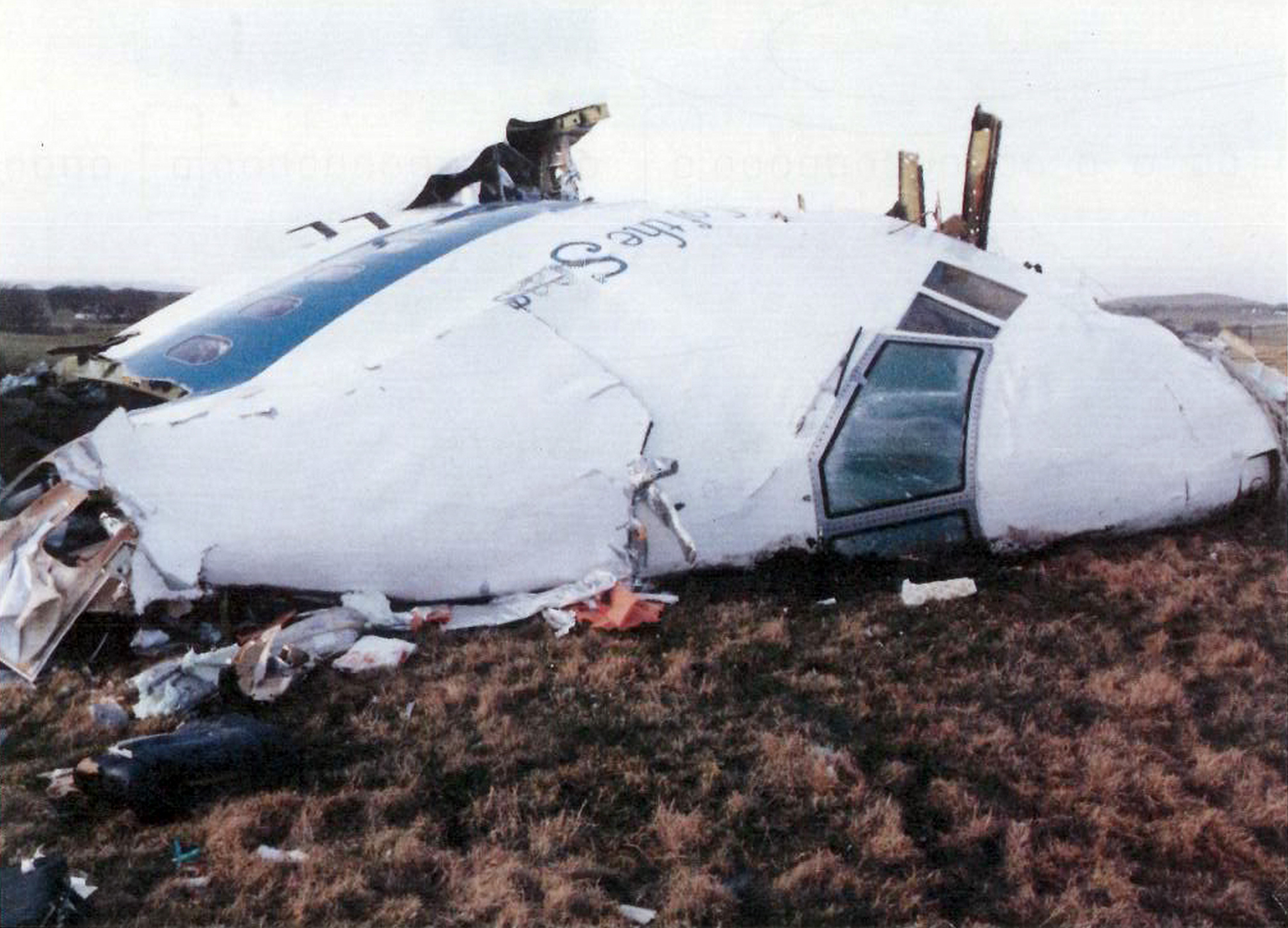
The front section of Pan Am Flight 103, the deadliest aviation incident to occur in the United Kingdom

- 2 May 1981 – Aer Lingus Flight 164, a Boeing 737, was hijacked before landing at Heathrow Airport, and flown to Le Touquet–Elizabeth II Airport in France, where the hijacker was apprehended.
- 26 June 1981 – Dan-Air Flight 240, a mail flight operated by Hawker Siddeley HS 748, broke up in mid-air and crashed at Nailstone, following the loss of the rear cabin door. All three crew were killed.
- 13 August 1981 – a Bristow Helicopters Westland Wessex crashed into the North Sea off the coast of Norfolk, killing all 13 on board.
- 16 July 1983 – British Airways Helicopters Flight 5918, a Sikorsky S-61, crashed into the sea off St Mary's Airport, Isles of Scilly, killing 20 of the 26 on board.
- 22 August 1985 – British Airtours Flight 28M, a Boeing 737-236, suffered an engine fire on take-off from Manchester Airport. Take-off was aborted and an emergency evacuation was initiated. Fire spread to the passenger cabin, killing 53 and seriously injuring 15 of the 131 people on board.
- 17 April 1986 – El Al Flight 016, a Boeing 747, was subject to an attempted bombing by Nezar al-Hindawi. Security guards at Heathrow Airport found explosives in the bag of his Irish fiancée, who stated she was unaware.
- 6 November 1986 – a British International Helicopters Boeing Chinook crashed into the sea on approach to Sumburgh Airport, killing 45 people and leaving only 2 survivors.
- 21 December 1988 – Pan Am Flight 103, a Boeing 747-100, was destroyed by a bomb over Lockerbie, Scotland. All 243 passengers and 16 crew members on board the aircraft were killed as well as 11 residents on the ground. As of 2026, this remains the deadliest terrorist attack and aviation incident in the United Kingdom.
- 8 January 1989 – British Midland Airways Flight 092, a Boeing 737-400, crashed at Kegworth whilst on approach to land at East Midlands Airport, where it was attempting an emergency landing. The port engine suffered a failure, but the starboard engine was shut down. Of the 126 people on board, 47 were killed and 79 were injured.

== 1990s ==
- 10 June 1990 – British Airways Flight 5390, a BAC One-Eleven, suffered an explosive decompression when a windscreen in the cockpit blew out in flight. The captain was partially ejected from the aircraft. An emergency landing was made at Southampton Airport. Two crew members (the captain and a flight attendant) were injured.
- 21 December 1994 – Air Algérie Flight 702P, a Boeing 737-2D6C, crashed into woodland following a collision with an electric tower on approach to Coventry Airport. All 5 people on board were killed.
- 19 January 1995 – Bristow Helicopters Flight 56C, a Eurocopter AS332 Super Puma, ditched southeast of the Brae oilfield after a lightning strike. The 18 occupants were rescued by a nearby ship.
- 24 May 1995 – Knight Air Flight 816, an Embraer 110, crashed in Dunkenswick shortly after take-off from Leeds Bradford Airport, killing all 12 people on board.
- 5 November 1997 – Virgin Atlantic Flight 024, an Airbus A340-311, suffered a partial undercarriage failure while being prepared for a landing at London Heathrow Airport. After numerous attempts to free the jammed left main undercarriage, an emergency landing was made. The aircraft suffered substantial damage. 7 of the 114 people on board were slightly injured in the subsequent emergency evacuation. The aircraft was repaired and returned to service.
- 3 September 1999 – Edinburgh Air Charter Flight 3W, a Cessna 404 operating for Airtours, crashed on takeoff from Glasgow Airport after suffering an engine failure, killing 8 of the 11 people on board.
- 22 December 1999 – Korean Air Cargo Flight 8509, a Boeing 747-2B5F, crashed two minutes after takeoff from London Stansted Airport. All four crew members were killed.

== 2000s ==
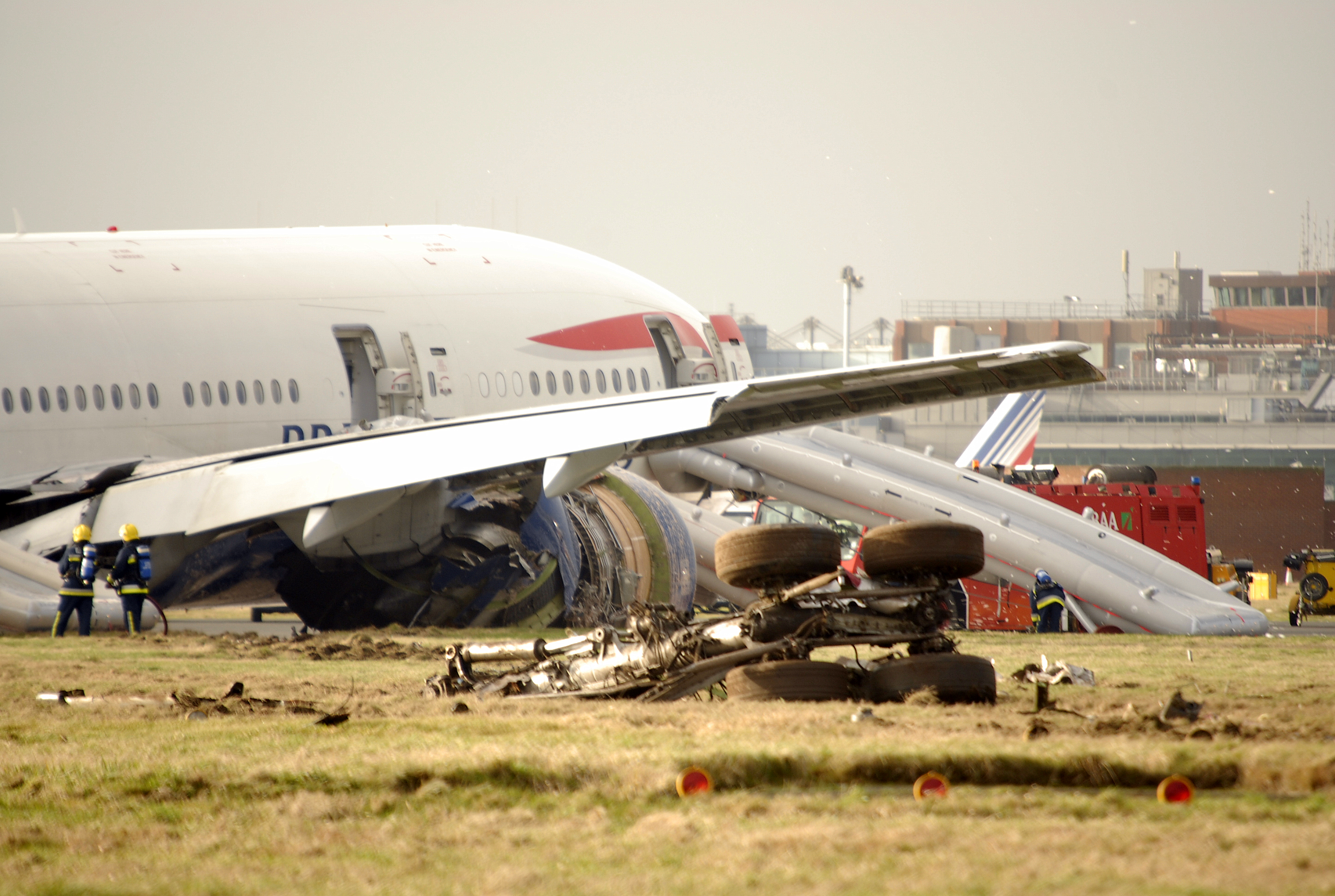
British Airways Flight 38

- 27 February 2001– Loganair Flight 670A, a Short 360-100 G-BNMT, suffered a double engine failure shortly after take-off from Edinburgh Airport. The aircraft ditched into the Firth of Forth, killing both pilots.
- 15 March 2005 – a Loganair Britten-Norman Islander carrying out an air ambulance mission crashed on approach to Campbeltown Airport, Argyll and Bute. Both people on board were killed.
- 17 January 2008 – British Airways Flight 38, a Boeing 777-236, suffered a double engine failure on approach to Heathrow and crashed short of the runway. There were 47 injuries amongst the 152 people on board. The double engine failure was caused by ice in the fuel blocking the fuel-oil heat exchangers on both engines.
- 1 April 2009 – Bond Offshore Helicopters Flight 85N, a Eurocopter Puma, crashed 11nm northeast of Peterhead, killing all 16 on board.

== 2010s ==
- 15 December 2014 – Loganair Flight 6780, a Saab 2000, lost control near Sumburgh after the pilots incorrectly reacted to a lightning strike. The aircraft plunged towards the sea, coming within 1100 feet of the water, until they regained control and were able to land safely.
- 21 July 2017 – Thomson Airways Flight 1526, a Boeing 737-800 operated by Sunwing Airlines, struck a runway approach light on takeoff from Belfast International Airport. The flight continued to Corfu with the crew unaware. No one was harmed.

== See also ==
- Air transport in the United Kingdom
- List of accidents and incidents involving airliners by location
- List of mid-air collisions and incidents in the United Kingdom
