= 1922 Thieuloy-Saint-Antoine mid-air collision =

First fatal mid air collision

Accident
- Date: 7 April 1922
- Summary: Mid-air collision in fog
- Site: Thieuloy-Saint-Antoine, Picardie, France; 49°38′00″N 01°56′49″E
- Total fatalities: 7
- Total survivors: 0

First aircraft
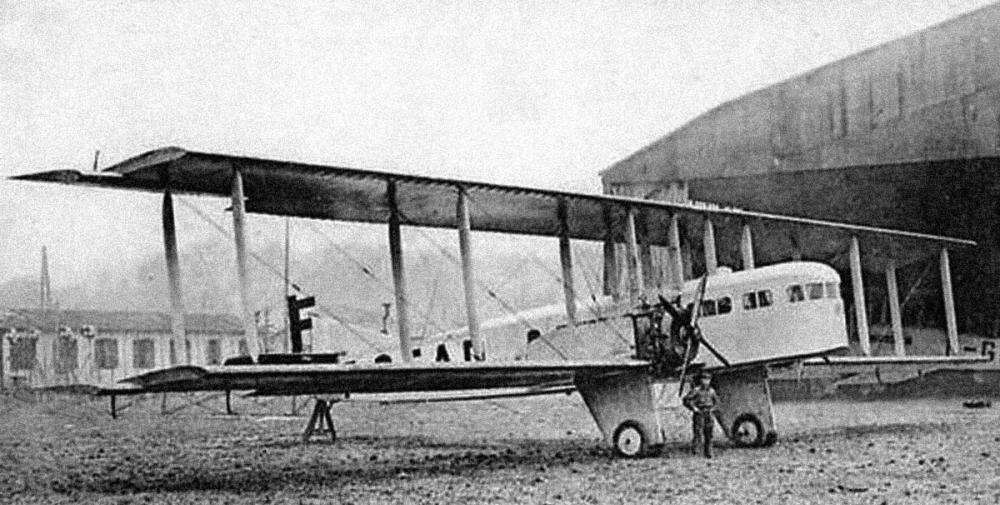
- F-GEAD, the F.60 involved in the accident
- Type: Farman F.60
- Operator: Compagnie des Grands Express Aériens (CGEA)
- Registration: F-GEAD
- Flight origin: Le Bourget Airport
- Destination: Croydon Airport
- Passengers: 3
- Crew: 2
- Fatalities: 5
- Survivors: 0

Second aircraft
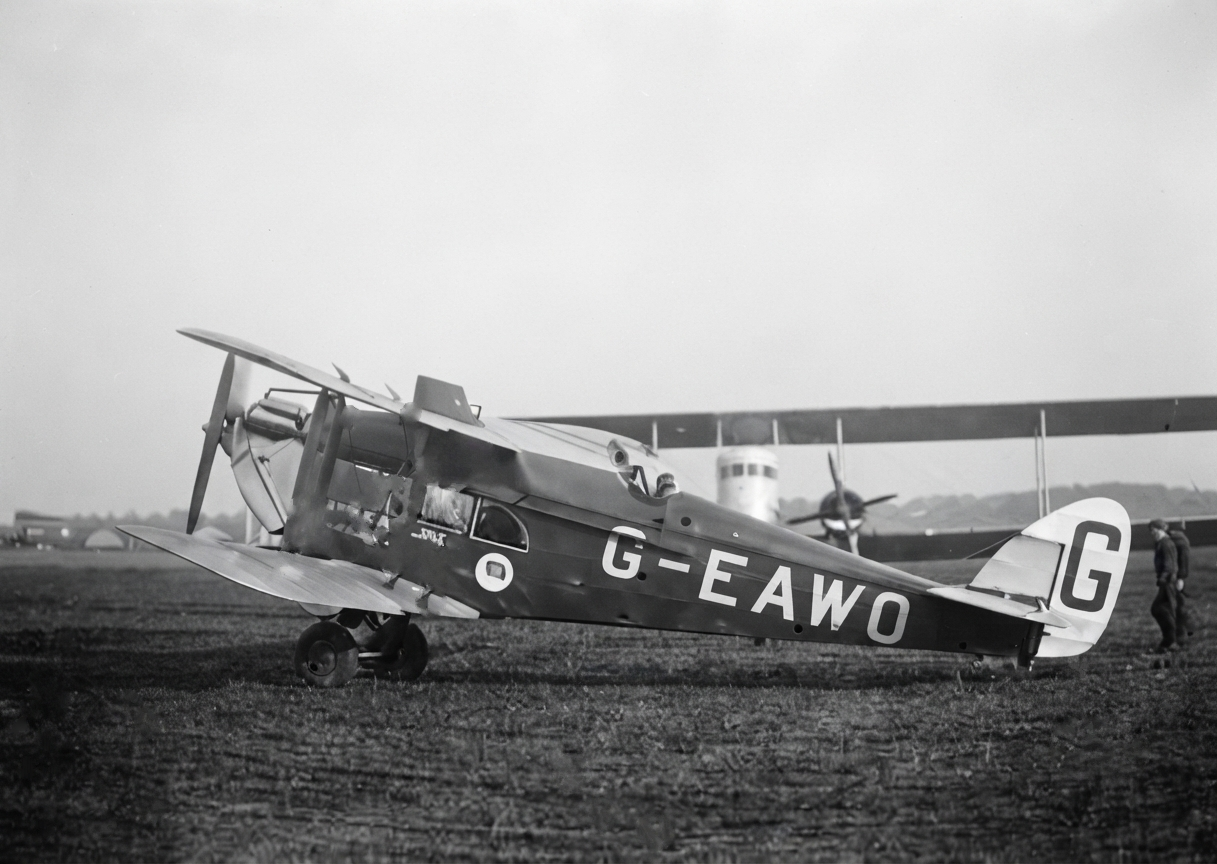
- G-EAWO, the DH-18A involved in the accident.
- Type: de Havilland DH.18
- Operator: Daimler Hire Limited
- Registration: G-EAWO
- Flight origin: Croydon
- Destination: Le Bourget Airport
- Passengers: 0
- Crew: 2
- Fatalities: 2
- Survivors: 0

The 1922 Thieuloy-Saint-Antoine mid-air collision took place on 7 April 1922 over Picardie, France, involving British and French passenger-carrying biplanes. The midair collision occurred in foggy conditions. A British aircraft flying from Croydon to Paris with only mail on board collided with a French aircraft flying three passengers from Paris to Croydon, which resulted in seven deaths. This was the first instance of a mid-air collision involving an airliner.

== Background ==
The first Airco-designed aircraft for airline work after World War I was the de Havilland DH.18A. One aircraft owned by the Air Ministry (registration G-EAWO), was transferred from Instone Air Line to Daimler Hire Limited for operation on the Croydon-Paris route until the three de Havilland DH.34s which Daimler had on order could be delivered.

The French company Compagnie des Grands Express Aériens (CGEA) was operating a Farman F.60 Goliath (registration F-GEAD) on a daily service from Le Bourget to Croydon.

== The flight ==
On 7 April 1922, four days after Daimler Hire commenced operations with the DH.18A, G-EAWO was flying mail from Croydon bound for Le Bourget, Paris, with only the pilot (Lieutenant R. E. Duke) and a boy steward (Hesterman) aboard. Meanwhile, the Goliath (F-GEAD) piloted by M. Mire had departed Le Bourget with three passengers and a mechanic. The three passengers were an American couple, Christopher Bruce Yule and the new Mrs. Mary Yule, who were on their honeymoon, and a French national, Monsieur Bouriez.

Following the normal route in drizzle and fog at an altitude of 150 m (492 ft), the DH.18A collided with the Goliath over Thieuloy-Saint-Antoine, 4 kilometres (2 mi) south of Grandvilliers in the Oise department (now part of Picardie), France, some 27 kilometres (17 mi) north of Beauvais and some 70 miles (110 km) north of Paris. All seven people died in the first-ever mid-air collision between airliners.

The weather was misty with poor visibility. The two aircraft suddenly encountered each other in the mist, neither having time to take evasive action. During the collision the DH.18 lost a wing and the tail, and impacted first, with the Goliath crashing a few minutes later. Although people on the ground quickly reached the scene, all were found to be dead except for the boy steward, who was badly injured. He was taken to the nearby village, but died of his injuries. Early reports claimed the British pilot was the survivor.

== Aftermath ==
Following the accident, a meeting was held at Croydon Airport by representatives of Compagnie des Grands Express Aériens, Compagnie des Messageries Aériennes, Daimler Airway, Handley Page Transport, Instone Air Line and KLM, as well as two representatives from the Air Ministry and various pilots employed by the companies. Among the resolutions passed at the meeting were that "keep to the right" was to become the universal rule of the air, new airliners should provide a clear view ahead for the pilot, and that all airliners should be equipped with radio. Clearly defined air routes were to be introduced in Belgium, France, the Netherlands and the United Kingdom.

== See also ==
- List of notable mid-air collisions
- List of accidents and incidents involving commercial aircraft
- October 1926 Air Union Blériot 155 crash – First mid-air fire on an airliner
