= CGEA =

CGEA may refer to:

== Aviation ==
- Compagnie des Grands Express Aériens - a defunct French airline
- Compagnie Générale d'Entreprises Aéronautiques - a defunct French airline

== Other ==
- Canadian Geothermal Energy Association
