= Flight 6780 =

Flight 6780 may refer to:

Listed chronologically

- American Airlines Flight 6780, crashed on 22 January 1952
- Loganair Flight 6780, suffered an uncontrolled descent on 15 December 2014
