= 1923 Daimler Airway de Havilland DH.34 crash =

Aircraft accident in England

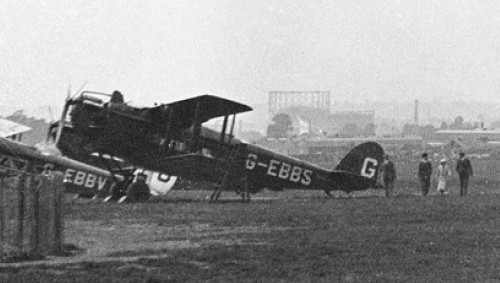
- G-EBBS, the DH.34 involved in the accident.

Accident
- Date: 14 September 1923
- Summary: Pilot error, stall
- Site: Ivinghoe, Buckinghamshire, England; 51.836384°N 0.626118°W

Aircraft
- Aircraft type: de Havilland DH.34
- Operator: Daimler Airway
- Registration: G-EBBS
- Flight origin: Croydon Airport, Surrey
- Destination: Alexandra Park Aerodrome, Manchester, Lancashire
- Passengers: 3
- Crew: 2
- Fatalities: 5
- Survivors: 0

The 1923 Daimler Airway de Havilland DH.34 crash occurred on 14 September 1923 when a de Havilland DH.34 of Daimler Airway operating a scheduled domestic passenger flight from Croydon to Manchester crashed at Ivinghoe, Buckinghamshire, England, killing all five people on board.

== Aircraft ==
The accident aircraft was de Havilland DH.34 G-EBBS, c/n 29. It had entered service with Daimler Hire Limited on 6 March 1922.

== Accident ==
The flight was a scheduled domestic passenger flight from Croydon to Manchester. It was also reported to be carrying mail, although this was later denied by the General Post Office. While flying over Buckinghamshire, a storm was encountered. Witnesses stated that an engine stopped, but was then restarted. It appeared to them that an emergency landing was going to be made at Ford End, Ivinghoe when the aircraft dived to the ground and crashed at Ivinghoe. The accident happened at about 18:05. The wreckage came to rest upside down, with both crew and all three passengers being killed. One witness reported hearing a violent explosion, but was not sure whether this was before the aircraft crashed or as a result of the crash.

Villagers extricated the victims from the wreckage. The deceased were taken to Ivinghoe Town Hall pending an inquest by the coroner. As a result of the crash, Daimler Airway temporarily suspended their service between Croydon and Manchester, due to having no aircraft to operate it.

The inquest opened on 17 September at Ivinghoe Town Hall. Evidence was given that the pilot was experienced, having flown for 755 hours, and that the aircraft was airworthy on departure from Croydon. It was carrying an adequate supply of fuel, having departed Croydon with 73 imperial gallons (330 L) of fuel against an estimated consumption of around 50 imperial gallons (230 L). The aircraft could carry eight passengers, but as only three were on board 400 pounds (180 kg) of ballast was carried, as well as a quantity of mail. Witnesses reported that the aircraft stalled before crashing. The inquest was adjourned until 24 September.

At the resumed inquest, further evidence was given in respect of the ballast, which comprised a sack of sand weighing 350 pounds (160 kg) and a large stone weighing about 50 pounds (23 kg). It was stated that the ballast was packed in such a way that it would not have moved in flight. The jury returned a verdict of "Accidental death" on all five victims. They agreed with the Coroner's suggestion that reports on investigations into aircraft accidents should be made available to the public, as was then the case with reports into railway accidents. This was something that The Times had called for in its issue of 19 September 1923, citing this accident and one that had occurred the previous month at East Malling, Kent.

== Investigation ==
An investigation was opened into the accident by the Accidents Investigation Branch of the Air Ministry, with Major Cooper in charge. The investigation concluded that the accident was caused by pilot error. The aircraft had stalled while a precautionary landing was being attempted.
