= 1924 Imperial Airways de Havilland DH.34 crash =

1924 aviation accident

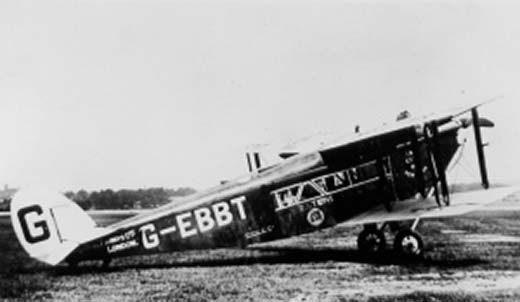
- A De Havilland DH.34, similar to the accident aircraft

Accident
- Date: 24 December 1924
- Summary: Undetermined
- Site: Purley, Surrey, United Kingdom; 51.3470°N 0.1057°W

Aircraft
- Aircraft type: de Havilland DH.34
- Operator: Imperial Airways
- Registration: G-EBBX
- Flight origin: Croydon, Surrey, United Kingdom
- Destination: Le Bourget, Paris, France
- Passengers: 7
- Crew: 1
- Fatalities: 8
- Survivors: 0

The 1924 Imperial Airways de Havilland DH.34 crash occurred on 24 December 1924 when de Havilland DH.34 G-EBBX of Imperial Airways crashed at Purley, Surrey, United Kingdom killing all eight people on board. The aircraft was operating a scheduled international flight from Croydon, Surrey, to Paris, France. It was the first fatal accident suffered by Imperial Airways and led to the first public inquiry into a civil aviation accident in the United Kingdom. As a result of issues brought up during the inquiry, Croydon Airport was expanded, absorbing most of Beddington Aerodrome.

== Aircraft ==
The aircraft involved was de Havilland DH.34 G-EBBX, c/n 35. The aircraft had been in service since 6 March 1922. It was owned by the Air Council and had been leased to Daimler Hire Ltd, passing to Imperial Airways when that airline was formed in March 1924. It had been manufactured in 1922, and the first certificate of airworthiness had been issued on 19 September. In April 1924, a new set of wings had been fitted to the aircraft. These wings were of a different type to the standard wings. A new certificate of airworthiness had been issued on 29 April. On 12 May, the aircraft was involved in a ground collision with a searchlight at an unnamed airfield, damaging the wings. The aircraft was subsequently refitted with standard wings, and a new certificate of airworthiness was issued on 24 November.

== Accident ==
The aircraft took off from Croydon Airport on a scheduled international passenger flight to Le Bourget Airport, Paris. Witnesses described the aircraft as flying low over Purley before nosediving to the ground, and overturning. The crash was followed by an explosion and fire. The crash site was 1 1/2 miles (2.4 km) from Croydon Airport, at Castle Hill, Purley, where the Kingsdown housing estate was then under construction. Attempts to rescue those on board were made, but the intensity of the fire made this task impossible. A witness stated that he thought the accident was unsurvivable. It was only after the local fire brigade had extinguished the fire that the bodies of the victims could be extricated from the wreckage. The accident was the first fatal accident suffered by Imperial Airways. The aircraft was insured with the British Aviation Insurance Group. A successful claim was made by Imperial Airways following the loss of the aircraft.

== Inquest ==
An inquest was opened in Croydon on 29 December. Identification evidence was heard, following which witness and pathological evidence was heard and the inquest was then adjourned until 9 January 1925. When the inquest resumed evidence was heard that in the days before the accident, the engine on G-EBBX had been running roughly with fluctuating oil pressure. A witness described hearing the engine making a rattling noise shortly before the aircraft nosedived. Another witness, a rigger in the employ of Imperial Airways stated that he heard nothing unusual with the engine noise, although he stated that the aircraft had stalled from an altitude of 300 feet (91 m). A witness who saw the take-off from Croydon stated that the take-off run was long, at 700 yards (640 m) and that the aircraft only gained height slowly. The following aircraft also performed similarly. Before the inquest had started, Major Brackley, an official of Imperial Airways based at Croydon Airport, had remarked that all aircraft that day had not lifted off easily. Rain in the days before the accident had left the grass runways sodden, which would have caused heavy aircraft to sink in and retarded acceleration on take-off. The aircraft had taken off uphill, which would also have retarded acceleration. After hearing further eyewitness evidence, the inquest was adjourned until 14 January.

At the resumption of the inquest, it was announced that a public inquiry was to be held into the accident. An allegation that Imperial Airways had attempted to interfere with a witness was not upheld by the Coroner. Evidence was then given about the manner of the take-off, and the firmness of the grass runway. The aircraft took off with a payload of 1,560 pounds (710 kg), just under the maximum allowable 1,572 pounds (713 kg). Major Cooper, the officer investigating the accident for the Accidents Investigation Branch, gave evidence that in his opinion there was no mechanical defect with the engine that could have caused the accident. The inquest was then adjourned until 21 January. On the resumption of the inquest, the Coroner announced that as a result of fresh evidence being available, coupled with Major Woods-Humphreys, the general manager of Imperial Airways, being taken ill, the inquest would be further adjourned until 12 February. When the inquest resumed, the Public Inquiry had concluded. The Coroner remarked that evidence from the Public Inquiry showed that there was no case for criminal negligence verdicts to be given. Major Cooper was then re-called and gave evidence confirming the result of the public inquiry. The jury stated that they had heard enough evidence to be in a position to give a verdict. After a brief adjournment and legal arguments, the inquest was adjourned until 18 February. A verdict of misadventure was given.

== Public Inquiry ==
An investigation was opened into the accident by the Accidents Investigation Branch. Under directions from Sir Sefton Brancker, a Public Inquiry was held, chaired by Sir Arthur Colefax, with Professor B M Jones and James Swinburne as assessors. The enquiry opened on 23 January 1925 at the Royal Courts of Justice, Strand, London. This was the first Public Inquiry into a civil aviation accident in the United Kingdom. The inquiry was held under the Air Navigation (Investigation of Accidents) Act, 1920, as amended in 1922. Evidence was given that the aircraft had a valid certificate of airworthiness and that at the time of the accident it was operating in an unmodified form. The aircraft was not overloaded and had been inspected on the morning of the day the accident occurred. Reported problems with the lubrication system on the Napier Lion engine had been rectified. Failure of the aircraft to reach its intended destinations in the week before the accident had been entirely due to weather conditions, and not as the result of any mechanical defect. The pilot, David Stewart, had served with the Royal Flying Corps and Royal Air Force, having been awarded the Military Cross, Distinguished Flying Cross and Air Force Cross. He had been a pilot since 1917. Evidence was given that a petrol pipe recovered from the wreckage was discovered to be partially obstructed internally. The possibility of this occurring before the crash could not be dismissed, although the obstruction could also have been as a result of the post-crash fire. The inquiry was then adjourned until 25 January.

On day two of the inquiry, Major Cooper gave evidence in respect of the flight of the aircraft, based on interviews with between 100 and 150 witnesses. He stated that the final manoeuvring of the aircraft was consistent with the pilot experiencing engine trouble and attempting to return to Croydon Airport. He stated that it was impossible to state that the engine had suffered a partial failure due to the partial obstruction of the petrol pipe. In the week before the crash, the aircraft had been away from Croydon for six days, having landed at Amsterdam, the Netherlands, Ostend, Belgium and Lympne, Kent, before returning to Croydon on the morning of 24 December. No licensed engineer was available at any of the airports away from Croydon. On arrival at Croydon, the engine was reported to be running rough. Routine servicing was carried out and the oil tank drained and refilled with fresh oil. The engine had then been ground tested, including being run for 20 minutes. Major Cooper opined that further investigation should have been undertaken given the report of rough running. It was revealed that a chart recording engine speeds during a flight from Ostend to Lympne was available, but Major Cooper had chosen not to analyse it. Sir Arthur Colefax stated that he would arrange for the document to be analysed to see if it would reveal any rough running in the engine. Evidence was given in respect of the petrol pipe. Major Cooper stated that it would not have been passed as fit for use in military aircraft, due to its construction. The inquiry was adjourned until 27 January.

On the third day of the enquiry, evidence was given that the engine chart did not show any problems with the engine on the flight between Ostend and Lympne, or on the subsequent flight from Lympne to Croydon. Captain Bert Hinchcliffe, who was the pilot of the aircraft on those flights gave evidence that the oil pressure had fluctuated on the flight on 18 December from Croydon to Amsterdam. He had reported the problem to a mechanic on arrival at Amsterdam, but was due to return to Croydon within the hour. On the return flight, the oil pressure had dropped to 25 pounds per square inch (1.7 bar) about half an hour after departure. He had continued for a while, then returned to Amsterdam due to weather conditions. The engine was overhauled by a mechanic, but fog prevented the aircraft departing until 23 December when Hinchcliffe flew to Ostend, where the aircraft was refuelled. Hinchcliffe did not report any problem with the engine to the engineer at Ostend. and then on to Lympne. During these flights, oil pressure was maintained at at least 58 pounds per square inch (4.0 bar), although it still fluctuated. The engine was reported to still be running rough. On the morning of 24 December, he flew from Lympne to Croydon. The Amsterdam-based mechanic gave evidence that he had changed all 24 spark plugs on the engine and that a half-hour test flight had then been flown. Evidence was given by Captain F. L. Barnard, who had taken off from Croydon on a flight to Paris in DH.34 G-EBBY shortly after the accident occurred. He had radioed that he thought that aircraft should not be loaded so heavily as it was. The engineer at Croydon gave evidence that the engine was worked on and that ground testing showed that it maintained an oil pressure of 70 pounds per square inch (4.8 bar) during 20 minutes running, including some bursts of full throttle. The inspection and work having taken an hour and ten minutes. The inquiry was then adjourned until the following day.

On day four of the enquiry, evidence was given by Imperial Airways Inspector of Engines that no example of the petrol pipe used on the aircraft had been rejected due to internal obstruction leading to reduced flow of fuel. He stated that he was satisfied that the engine was serviceable at the time of departure. Captain Barnard, who flew G-EBBY to Paris shortly after the accident had occurred, disagreed with a suggestion put to him that there was a problem with the engine, saying that he did not think anyone could give a cause for the crash, other than the aircraft having stalled. Further evidence was heard as to the loading of the aircraft. The maintenance regime at Imperial Airways and the reliability of the de Havilland DH.34 were called into question by Mr Beyfus, a legal representative of one of the victims. Two witnesses from the aircraft's insurers gave evidence that Imperial Airways maintenance regime was to the company's satisfaction. The Imperial Airways manager at Amsterdam corroborated Hinchcliffe's earlier evidence. The inquiry was then adjourned until the next day.

On the fifth day of the enquiry, managing director of Imperial Airways Colonel Frank Searle gave evidence that Imperial Airways pilots had absolute discretion to refuse to fly any aircraft if, in their opinion, the aircraft was unfit for flight for whatever reason. He stated that the petrol pipe supplied by Petro-Flex to Imperial Airways was of an armoured type, but that unarmoured pipes had been fitted to some aircraft taken over when Imperial Airways had been formed, and that spares from these companies were in stock and being used. Both armoured and unarmoured pipes had been approved for use by the Air Ministry. A representative from Petro-Flex corroborated Searle's evidence in respect of the type of piping supplied to Imperial Airways. Evidence was given that the flight from Lympne to Croydon was with the aircraft lightly loaded, and that the performance of the engine with a restricted fuel pipe would be different from that with a full load. The Chief Engineer of D. Napier & Son gave evidence that Imperial Airways maintenance regime was of the highest standard. The inquiry was then adjourned until the next day.

On day six of the inquiry, Mr Beyfus further attempted to call into question Imperial Airways maintenance regime, and the safety of the de Havilland DH.34. The suitability of Croydon Airport for operation of airliners was also called into question. It was suggested that the runway should be extended by 100 to 200 yards (91 to 183 m) to ensure safety. The inquiry was adjourned until 2 February.

On the seventh day of the inquiry, it was announced that Croydon Airport was to be extended, with 150 acres (61 ha) of the neighbouring Beddington Aerodrome being absorbed into the current airfield, Plough Lane being diverted to allow this. An Act of Parliament would be needed before the expansion could take place, for which a bill was in preparation. Finance had been allocated to allow the expansion. Evidence was heard that Croydon was then considered to be the most suitable location for an airport to serve London. Further evidence was heard about the Napier Lion engine, with Mr Beyfus again calling into question the maintenance regime at Imperial Airways, calling the engine "a veritable Cassandra", issuing warnings for seven days that had gone unheeded except by Hinchcliffe. Beyfus denied that his line of questioning was to obstruct the inquiry in its investigation, but stated that as the Air Ministry oversaw civil aviation, it was not entirely amicus curiae in the matter. Counsel for Imperial Airways stated that Beyfus representing a victim of the accident was a front, and that he was really there to represent the interests of certain persons present at the inquiry who had declined to give evidence themselves. He submitted that the accident was caused by weather conditions, and not by any problem with the engine. The inquiry was then adjourned until the next day.

On day eight of the inquiry, various submissions were made to the inquiry in respect of the petrol pipe, the relationship between the Air Ministry and Imperial Airways and the licensing of engineers abroad. Mr Beyfus's allegations were rejected by the inquiry, which found that the Air Ministry had acted properly in matters under its jurisdiction. Sir Arthur Colefax stated that he and his advisors would visit Croydon Airport before publishing the report into the accident.

The report into the inquiry was published on 10 February 1925. The inquiry concluded that the aircraft was airworthy at the time of departure. There was no blockage in the petrol pipe, such damage being as a result of the firefighting operations subsequent to the crash. The use of unarmoured pipe had been allowed by Air Ministry officials who were unaware of an instruction issued on 6 December 1923 that armoured piping was to be used. Such usage of non-armoured piping had no relevance to the accident. The then-current conditions existing at Croydon Airport meant that pilots were unable to comply with certain parts of the Air Navigation (Consolidation) Order, 1923 and that the condition of the airfield was at least a contributory factor in the accident. It also found that clarification of the meaning of the word "flight" in parts of the order was needed. No negligence was found on the part of the Air Ministry or Imperial Airways. The pilot was cleared of blame for the accident. The aircraft was found to have crashed due to an unknown mechanical defect and subsequent stall whilst an emergency landing was being attempted.

== Casualties ==
The nationalities of the casualties were:-

Nationality	Crew	Passengers	Total
United Kingdom	1	5	6
Brazil	–	1	1
Chile	–	1	1
Total	1	7	8

== Memorial ==
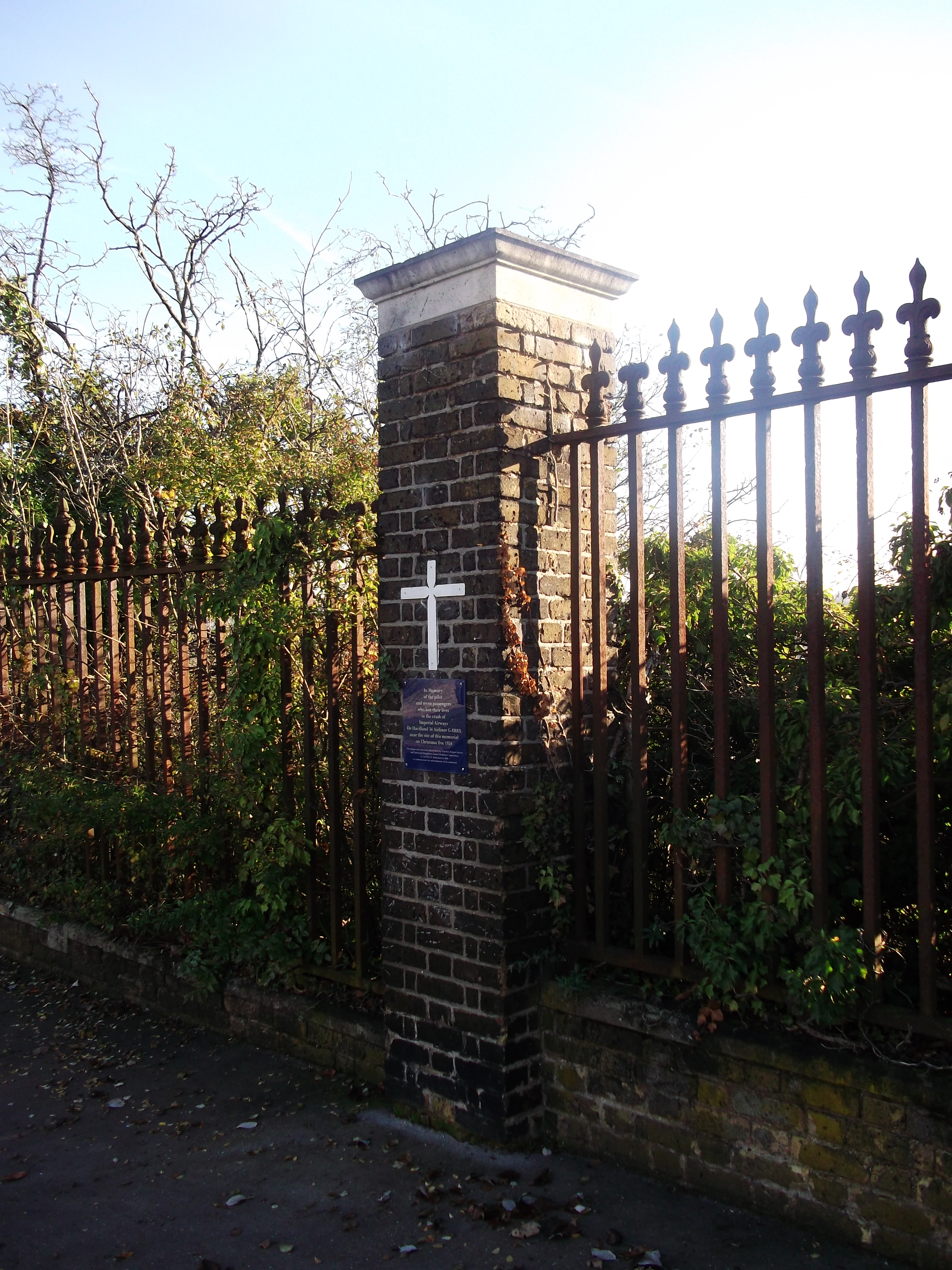
The memorial on Kingsdown Avenue, Croydon

A memorial plaque and cross was placed on Kingsdown Avenue in 2006.
