= Grands Express Aériens =

French airline

Compagnie des Grands Express Aériens
IATA	ICAO	Call sign
N/A	N/A	N/A
- Founded: 20 March 1919
- Ceased operations: 1 April 1923
- Operating bases: Le Bourget Airport, Paris, France

The Compagnie des Grands Express Aériens was a pioneering French airline established 20 March 1919 and operating until merged with Compagnie des Messageries Aériennes to form Air Union on 1 January 1923.

Headquartered at 3, Rue d'Anjou, Paris, CGEA operated passenger flights from Le Bourget Paris to London's Croydon Aerodrome and also to Lausanne, eventually adding Geneva service in late October 1921. They flew Farman F.60 Goliath aircraft, a design converted from an earlier bomber into a luxury cabin aircraft. They also purchased a ten-passenger Vickers Vimy Commercial, also a converted bomber design.

== Accidents and incidents ==
- On 8 October 1921, A Farman F.60 Goliath made an emergency landing at Saint-Inglevert, Pas-de-Calais due to problems with a propeller shortly after the aircraft had crossed the French coast. The aircraft was operating an international scheduled passenger flight from Le Bourget Airport, Paris to Croydon Airport, Surrey, United Kingdom. Another aircraft was despatched from Paris to take the six passengers on to Croydon.
- On 30 November 1921, Farman F.60 Goliath F-GEAD was damaged in a forced landing at Smeeth, Kent, United Kingdom. The aircraft was repaired and returned to service.
- On 11 February 1922, Goliath F-GEAI was written off in a forced landing at Farnborough, Kent.
- On 7 April 1922, Goliath F-GEAD, flying from Le Bourget to London Croydon was lost in the first-ever midair collision of airliners. In early afternoon, under drizzle and fog conditions, the F.60 collided head-on with a Daimler Airway de Havilland DH.18A making the reverse run 150 metres above the same railway line. All seven people aboard the two aircraft were killed, including three passengers on the Goliath.

== Innovation ==
CGEA's chief pilot René Labouchère together with Raoul Badin defined the first IFR control panel in 1922, which they called the "Contrôleur de vol Badin" (en: Badin flight controller). The following year it was made mandatory equipment on all transport flights.
