= Instone Air Line =

Airline of the United Kingdom (1919–1924)

- Founded: 1919
- Ceased operations: 31 March 1924 (merged with British Marine Air Navigation Co Ltd, Daimler Airway and Handley Page Transport to form Imperial Airways)
- Hubs: Cologne, London and Paris
- Fleet size: See Fleet below
- Destinations: Hounslow Heath Aerodrome 1919–1920 / Croydon Airport 1920–1924 (London); Le Bourget Aerodrome 1919–1922 (Paris); Butzweilerhof 1922–1924 (Cologne)
- Parent company: S. Instone & Company Limited
- Headquarters: London, England, United Kingdom
- Key people: Samuel Instone

Instone Air Line was an early British airline from 1919 to 1924. Along with other private airlines of the time, it was absorbed into Imperial Airways.

This airline is not to be confused with the Instone Air Line Ltd. of Stansted, which operated from 1981 to about 1996 with Bristol Freighter and Douglas DC-6.

== History ==
S. Instone & Company Limited, a shipping company set up by Sir Samuel Instone, had operated a private air service from Cardiff via London's Hounslow Heath Aerodrome to Le Bourget aerodrome, near Paris, since 1919. From April 1920 it ran the service between London and Paris as a public service using the name Instone Air Line. In 1920 it was the first airline to transport a racehorse and on 1 January 1922 the company introduced uniforms to its pilots and staff; possibly the first airline to do so. It started a London to Cologne (Butzweilerhof) service in May 1922. It stopped operating the London-Paris route in October 1922 due to competition.

In 1923, a government committee recommended that the main British airlines should merge, to establish one, financially strong, airline, and to enable it to undertake the necessary expansions. Following this recommendation, Imperial Airways was created on 1 April 1924, absorbing the assets and routes of Handley Page Transport, Instone Air Line, Daimler Airway and British Marine Air Navigation Co Ltd.

There is a history of the airline: Early Birds – Air Transport Memories 1919–1924 by Alfred Instone (published by Western Mail & Echo, Cardiff, 1938) containing a number of photographs.

== Accidents and incidents ==
- In February 1923, an aircraft belonging to Instone was damaged in an accident at Saint-Inglevert, Pas-de-Calais, France.
- On 13 August 1923, de Havilland DH.34 G-EBBW landed at Marden Airfield, Kent due to a broken oil pipe. The aircraft was repaired and returned to Croydon.

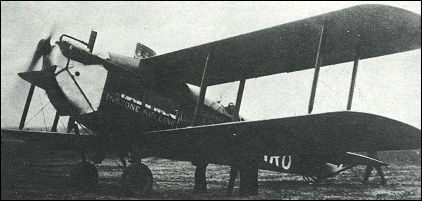
de Havilland DH.18 which was loaned to Instone from 1921 to 1924 and named "City of Cardiff"

== See also ==
- List of defunct airlines of the United Kingdom
