= Alexandra Park Aerodrome =

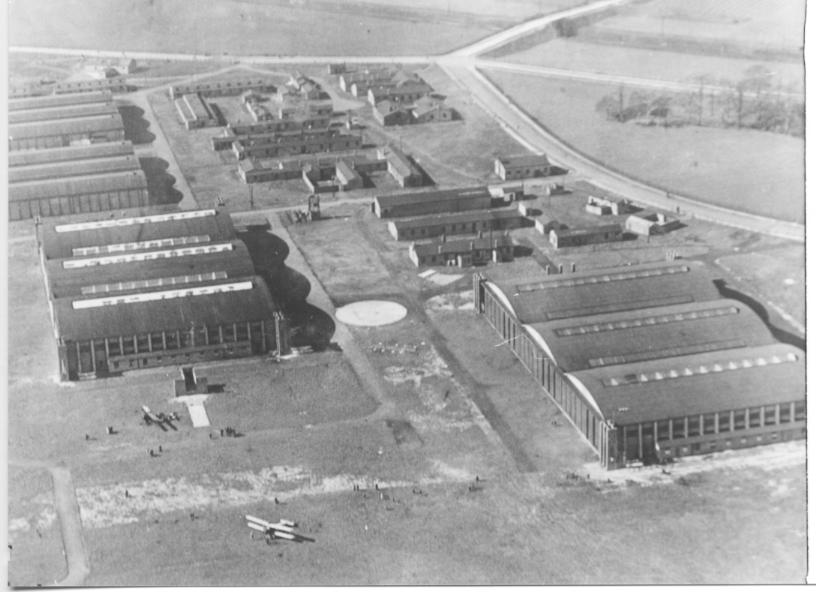
- Photograph of the aerodrome in 1923 looking west over the two sets of large triple Belfast Truss hangars
- IATA: none; ICAO: none

Summary
- Airport type: Public
- Owner: Egerton Estate (operated post First World War by Manchester Corporation)
- Serves: Manchester
- Location: junction of Princess Road and Mauldeth Road West
- Coordinates: 53.4364°N 2.2502°W

Map
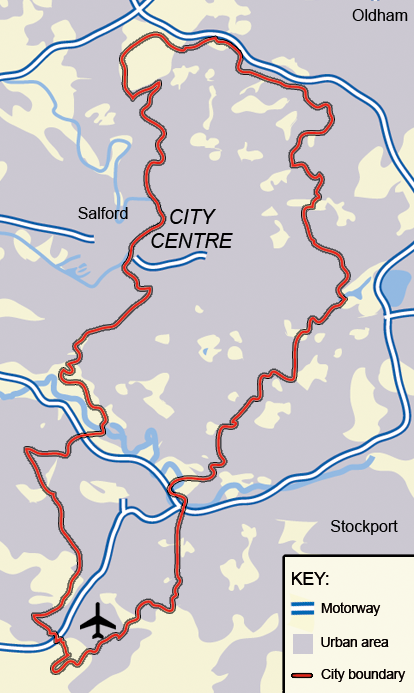
- Location of the airport in Manchester Alexandra Park (Greater Manchester)
- A grass airfield used by the military during the First World War and as a civilian airport after the war

Alexandra Park Aerodrome was the second purpose-built aerodrome in the Manchester area in England. The site was chosen by the War Department in 1917 because of its open agricultural nature, and lay between the neighbouring districts of Fallowfield, Chorlton-cum-Hardy, Whalley Range, Withington and West Didsbury, at the junction of Princess Road and Mauldeth Road West, three miles south of Manchester's city centre: the land was owned by the Egerton Estate. The aerodrome's brief existence is commemorated on a plaque in the sports pavilion at Hough End Playing Fields, which now occupy part of the site. A commemorative plaque was unveiled on 7 July 2007 to mark the 90th anniversary of the aerodrome and is located in the grounds of No. 184 (Manchester South) Squadron, Air Cadets, in Hough End Crescent.

== Operational history 1918–19 ==
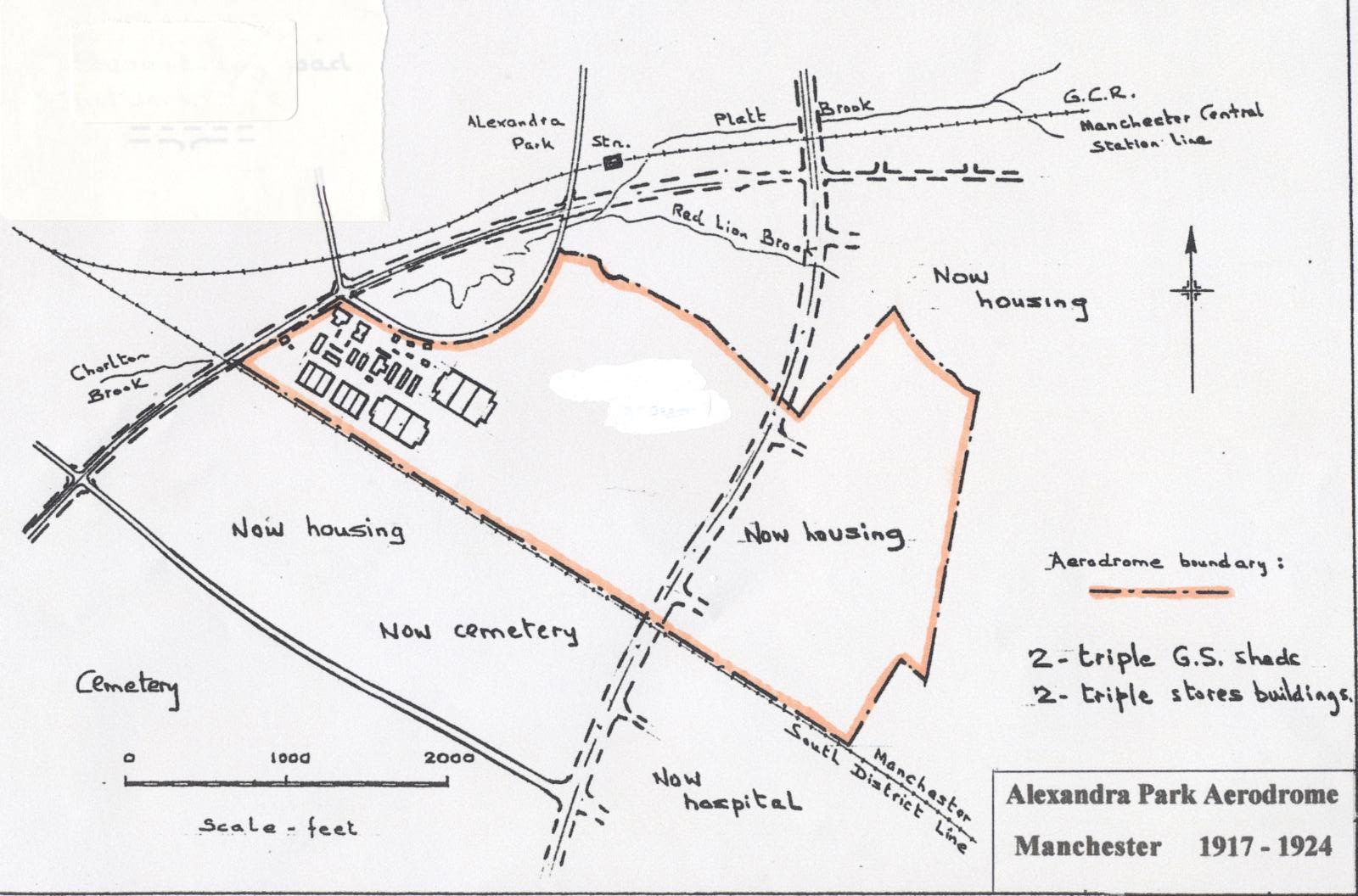
Chart showing the layout and facilities at Alexandra Park Aerodrome 1917–1924. The sets of hangars are in the north-east section. Princess Road, built after closure in late 1924, passes through the centre of the old aerodrome. Mauldeth Road West runs to the north (top) of the site.

Following the closure of the Trafford Park Aerodrome (Manchester) in 1918 after only seven years of spasmodic use, Alexandra Park Aerodrome was constructed and opened in May 1918 by the War Department for the assembly, test flying and delivery of aeroplanes for the Royal Air Force (RAF) built in the Manchester area by A. V. Roe & Company (Avro) at Newton Heath and the National Aircraft Factory No. 2 (NAF No.2) at Heaton Chapel. The aerodrome took its name from the nearby Alexandra Park railway station on the Great Central Railway branch line to Manchester Central railway station. Many aeroplanes were brought to the aerodrome in major sections by rail from Avro and NAF No.2 to the nearby station; other dismantled aeroplanes came by road. A Relief Landing Ground was designated at Turn Moss, one nautical mile to the west, in Stretford.

On 1 May 1919, the first day of civil flying in Britain after the First World War, Lt Col Sholto Douglas arrived from Cricklewood Aerodrome London, at the controls of a Handley Page 0/400 converted bomber of Handley Page Transport. The aeroplane carried ten passengers in its windowless fuselage and had taken 3 hours 40 minutes flying from London against strong headwinds.

The Avro Transport Company operated the UK's first scheduled domestic air service from Alexandra Park via Birkdale Sands (Southport) to South Shore (Blackpool) between 24 May and 30 September 1919, mainly using Avro 504 three-seat biplanes. Although the weather caused a few flights to be cancelled, the daily service was operated without mishap. Aircraft left Alexandra Park at 2:00 pm and arrived in Blackpool 45 minutes later, after having stopped over at Southport. Tickets cost nine guineas return or five guineas one-way, equivalent to about £324 and £180 respectively as of 2008. (Note: Comparing relative purchasing power of 9 and 5 guineas in 1919 with 2008)

== Operations 1920–24 ==
At the 1921 census, officers and men of the 7th and 8th Lancashire Fusiliers are recorded as being stationed at the aerodrome.

From 1922 until 1924 Daimler Airway operated daily scheduled passenger flights from the aerodrome to Croydon Airport near London, later followed by a regular extension to Schiphol Airport Amsterdam. The northbound flight left Croydon in the early evening and after an overnight stop, the aircraft returned south during the morning. These timings enabled Manchester passengers to connect readily with Daimler's other continental flights to and from Croydon, and with other airline services from that airport. Because air travel was seen as so dangerous, the ticket agent, Messrs. Robinsons of Whalley Range developed a system to reassure travellers relatives. Upon a safe landing at Croydon Airport, a telegram was despatched to Robinsons' office, on receipt of which a messenger boy was despatched in turn to the travellers' homes.

On the evening of 14 September 1923 the northbound de Havilland DH.34 ten-seat biplane airliner crashed near Ivinghoe Beacon in the Chilterns during an attempted forced landing in poor weather. The two pilots and three passengers were killed, making this the first fatal accident on an internal air service in the UK: because of this the route was suspended for a period before recommencing.

On the merger of Daimler with other airlines to form Imperial Airways in April 1924, the new monopoly airline terminated the service: it was 1930 before Imperial again flew any schedules to any UK airport north of London.

Aircraft competing in the King's Cup Race air races landed here in 1922 and 1923; there were also a number of flying displays at the aerodrome. The Lancashire Aero Club, the oldest flying club in Britain, was formed at and operated from Alexandra Park until 1924, when it moved to Woodford Aerodrome.

== Closure ==
The terms of the land lease, laid down by Maurice Egerton, Baron Egerton of Tatton, stipulated that flying from the site would cease within five years of the war's end. The ancillary buildings that had been erected for training RAF personnel, were converted to provide accommodation for single constables of the Manchester City Police. This marked the start of a police presence that continues through until today. The aerodrome closed to air traffic on 24 August 1924, and the hangars were demolished. It would have been unable to cope anyway with the increasing size and weight of airliners by the mid-1930s. Princess Road was built through the eastern part of the site in 1924–25 and a council housing estate was built to the east of the new road. During the Second World War temporary housing was built alongside Princess Road by German POWs. This was demolished in 1961, along with a bridge over the Midland Railway line towards Nell Lane. The last known light aircraft touch-and-go landing was in 1986.

== Current status ==
The remaining area of open land to the west of Princess Road is now Hough End Playing Fields, a council-owned facility with 24 full-size soccer pitches and 3 rugby pitches. Broughton Park RUFC also have their facilities there. These pitches occupy land that was part of the grass aerodrome and flying still takes place here with Hough End Model Aircraft Club keeping the spirit of aviation alive. The aerodrome's hangars and ancillary buildings stood on the site of today's GMP Sports and Social Club at Hough End. This is also where Greater Manchester Police (GMP) train their dogs and horses. The GMP helicopter uses the pitches at the Sports and Social Club as a landing spot from time to time if it has a medical emergency (patients are taken on to Wythenshawe Hospital) or dog handlers need to be airlifted to incidents in the helicopter. The new swimming pool for Withington and Chorlton-cum-Hardy is being built there. On a small part of the site, adjacent to Princess Road, is the new Withington Metrolink station.
