= Thieuloy-Saint-Antoine =

- Commune
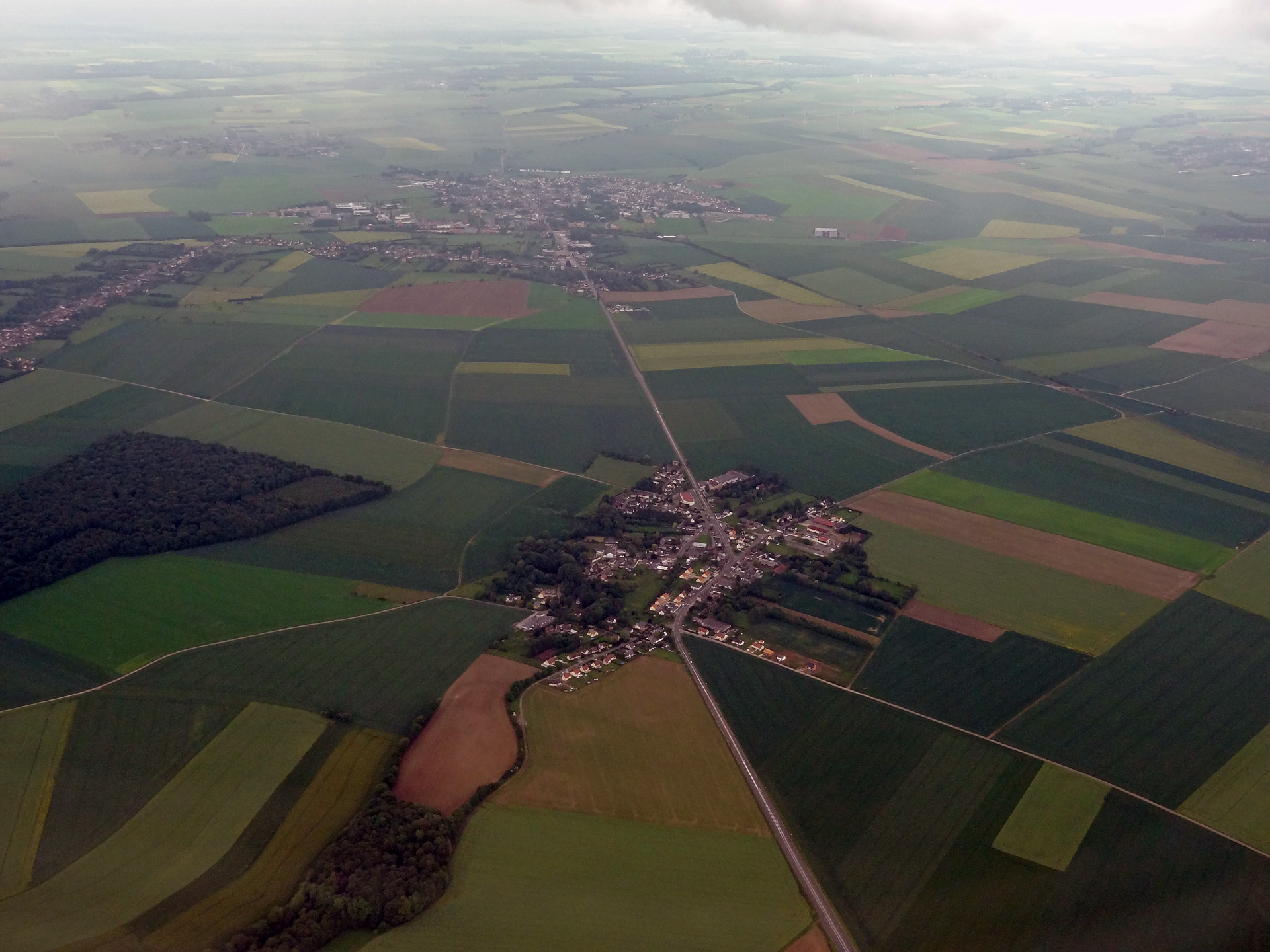
- An aerial view of Thieuloy-Saint-Antoine
- Location of Thieuloy-Saint-Antoine
- Location within France Location within Hauts-de-France
- Coordinates: 49°38′06″N 1°56′49″E
- Country: France
- Region: Hauts-de-France
- Department: Oise
- Arrondissement: Beauvais
- Canton: Grandvilliers
- Intercommunality: Picardie Verte

Government
  - Mayor (2020–2026): Jacky Dumont
- Area^{1}: 2.49 km^{2} (0.96 sq mi)
- Elevation: 200 m (660 ft)
- Highest elevation: 196 m (643 ft)
- Lowest elevation: 165 m (541 ft)
- Population (2023): 379
  - Density: 152/km^{2} (394/sq mi)
- Time zone: UTC+01:00 (CET)
  - Summer (DST): UTC+02:00 (CEST)
- INSEE/Postal code: 60633 /60210
- ^{1} French Land Register data, which excludes lakes, ponds, glaciers > 1 km^{2} (0.386 sq mi or 247 acres) and river estuaries.

Thieuloy-Saint-Antoine (French pronunciation: [tjœlwa sɛ̃.t‿ɑ̃twan]) is a commune in the Oise department in northern France.

== See also ==
- Communes of the Oise department
