= De Havilland DH.18 =

1920 biplane airliner by de Havilland

DH.18
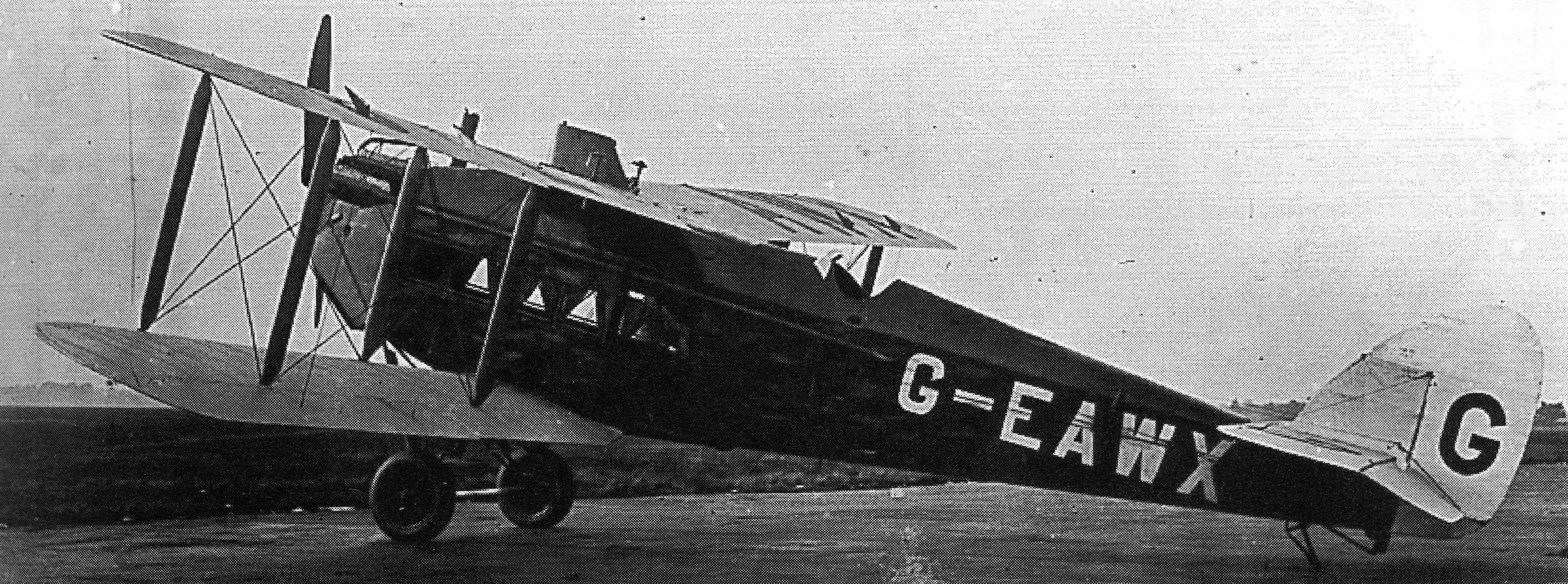
- DH.18B

General information
- Type: Airliner
- Manufacturer: Airco
- Designer: Geoffrey de Havilland
- Primary users: Aircraft Transport and Travel Daimler Hire Ltd; Instone Air Line
- Number built: 6

History
- Manufactured: 1919–1921
- Introduction date: 1920
- First flight: 8 April 1920
- Retired: 1923

The de Havilland DH.18 was a single-engined British biplane transport aircraft of the 1920s built by de Havilland.

== Design and development ==
The DH.18 was designed and built in 1919 by Airco as their first aircraft specifically for commercial work, earlier aircraft such as the DH.16 being modified military types. The DH.18 was a single-engined biplane, powered by a Napier Lion engine with wooden two-bay, wire-braced wings, and a forward fuselage clad in plywood. It accommodated eight passengers in an enclosed cabin with the pilot in an open cockpit behind the cabin. The first prototype flew early in 1920.

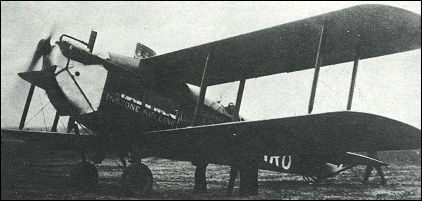
DH.18A G-EARO of Instone Air Lines

== Operational history ==
The first DH.18 was delivered to Aircraft Transport and Travel for use on the Croydon-Paris service, but was wrecked in a forced landing shortly after takeoff from Croydon on 16 August 1920. Two more aircraft were under construction by Airco for Aircraft Transport and Travel when the bankrupt Airco was purchased by BSA, who did not wish to continue aircraft development or production. Geoffrey de Havilland, the chief designer of Airco then set up the de Havilland Aircraft Company, completing the two partly completed aircraft as DH.18As, with improved engine mountings and undercarriages.

Aircraft Transport and Travel closed down in early 1921, due to competition from subsidised French airlines. In March 1921, the British government granted temporary subsidies for airline services, with the Air Council purchasing a number of modern commercial aircraft for leasing to approved firms. The three ex-A.T.&T. DH.18s were purchased in this way and leased to Instone Air Line. A further DH.18A was built to Air Council order, as were two modified DH.18B, which had fuselages that were entirely plywood-clad and had built-in emergency exits.

The DH.18s were kept busy flying on continental air services for Instone, building up high flying hours. One aircraft, G-EAWO, was transferred to Daimler Airway for operation on the Croydon-Paris route until the de Havilland DH.34s which it had on order could be delivered. However, on 4 April 1922, two days after Daimler commenced operations with the aircraft, it collided with a Farman Goliath over Northern France, 62 mi (100 km) north of Paris, killing seven people, the first midair collision between airliners.

The DH.18 was retired from commercial service in 1923, with one aircraft, G-EARO, having flown 90,000 mi (144,834 km) without accident. Two aircraft were used for test purposes, with one the subject of an Air Ministry experiment on how long an aircraft could stay afloat after being ditched, being deliberately landed on water off Felixstowe on 2 May 1924, floating for 25 minutes. The other remaining aircraft was used for test purposes at RAE Farnborough until 1927, when it was scrapped.

== Variants ==
DH.18
Prototype – registered G-EARI.
DH.18A
Initial production version – modified undercarriages and engine mountings. Three built – (G-EARO, G-EAUF, G-EAWO).
DH.18B
Plywood-covered fuselage and increased weights. Two built – (G-EAWW and G-EAWX).

== Operators ==
United Kingdom

- Aircraft Transport and Travel
- Instone Air Line
- Daimler Hire Ltd
- Handley Page Transport

Netherlands

- KLM (Leased)

== Specifications (DH.18A) ==
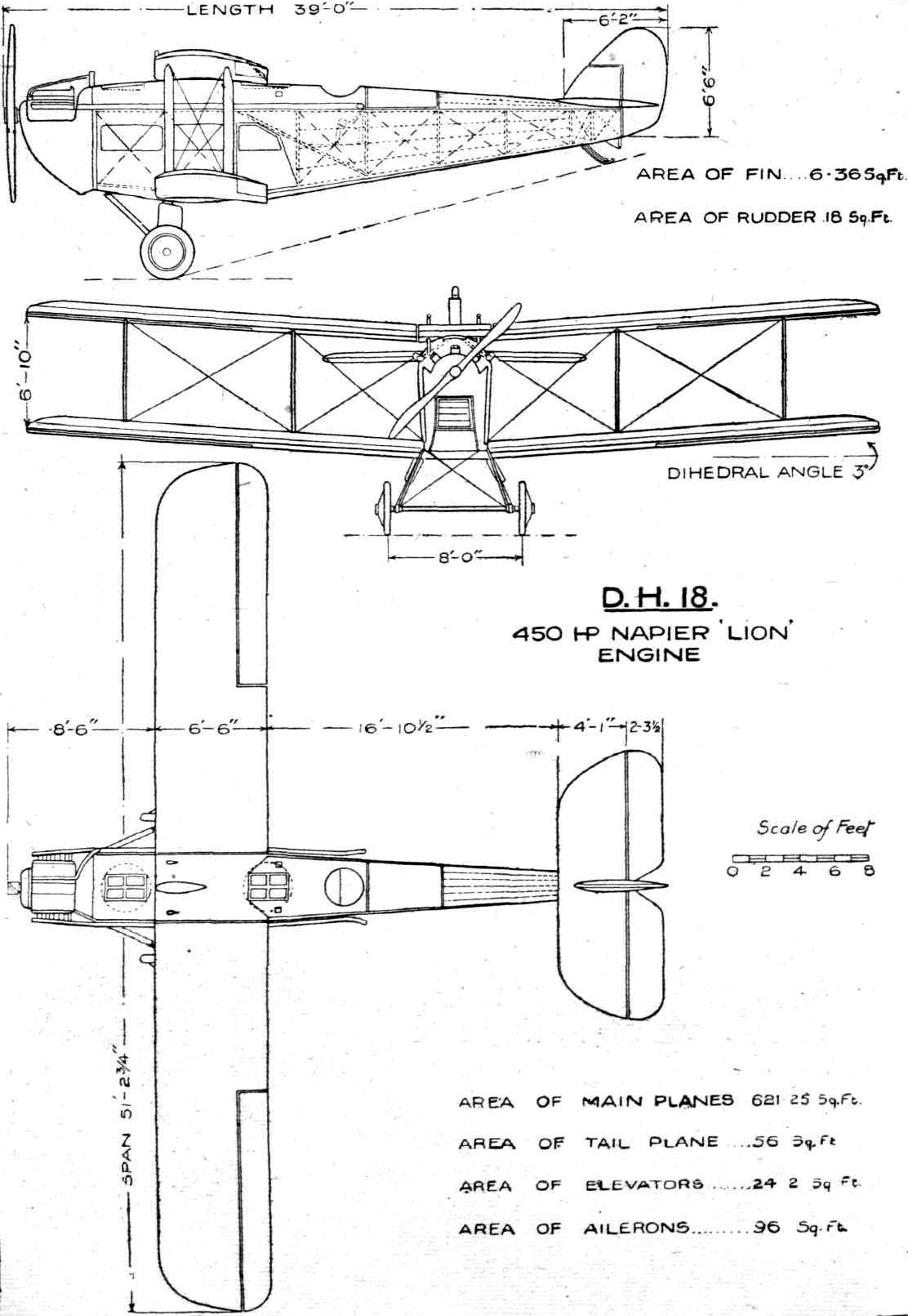
De Havilland DH.18 3-view drawing from Flight, 24 March 1921

Data from British Civil Aircraft since 1919, Volume 2

General characteristics

- Crew: One
- Capacity: 8 passengers
- Length: 39 ft 0 in (11.89 m)
- Wingspan: 51 ft 3 in (15.62 m)
- Height: 13 ft (4.0 m)
- Wing area: 621 sq ft (57.7 m^{2})
- Empty weight: 4,040 lb (1,833 kg)
- Gross weight: 6,516 lb (2,956 kg)
- Powerplant: 1 × Napier Lion 12-cylinder water-cooled W-block aircraft piston engine, 450 hp (340 kW)
- Propellers: 2-bladed wood fixed pitch propeller

Performance

- Maximum speed: 125 mph (201 km/h, 109 kn)
- Cruise speed: 100 mph (160 km/h, 87 kn)
- Range: 400 mi (640 km, 350 nmi)
- Service ceiling: 16,000 ft (4,900 m)
- Rate of climb: 660 ft/min (3.4 m/s)

== See also ==
- 1920 in aviation

Related development

- De Havilland DH.16
- De Havilland DH.34

Aircraft of comparable role, configuration, and era

- BAT FK.26
- Martinsyde Buzzard
- Sopwith Antelope
- Sopwith Wallaby
- Vickers Vulcan
- Westland Limousine

Related lists

- List of aircraft
