= Daimler Airway =

Airline of the United Kingdom (1921–1924)

- Founded: 7 June 1919 as Daimler Air Hire
- Commenced operations: April 1922 as Daimler Airway
- Ceased operations: 1 April 1924 (merged with British Marine Air Navigation Co Ltd, Handley Page Transport and Instone Air Line to form Imperial Airways)
- Operating bases: Alexandra Park Aerodrome, England
- Hubs: Croydon Airport, London, England
- Fleet size: 6 de Havilland DH.34
- Destinations: Amsterdam; Hanover; Berlin
- Parent company: Birmingham Small Arms Company (BSA) group's Daimler Company

Daimler Airway was an airline subsidiary of the Birmingham Small Arms Company (BSA)'s Daimler Company. It was created as Daimler Air Hire and became Daimler Airway after combination with the assets of the failed ventures Airco and its subsidiary, Aircraft Transport and Travel, which were acquired by BSA in February 1920.

== History ==
=== Daimler Air Hire ===
Birmingham Small Arms Company (BSA) subsidiary Daimler Company established Daimler Air Hire as a private air hire company on 7 June 1919. Daimler Hire's managing director was Lieutenant Colonel Frank Searle CBE, DSO, who had also been a senior manager of Daimler prior to his war service. During the First World War Daimler had acquired considerable aviation experience manufacturing aero engines and aircraft, including bombers. They built Gnome Monosoupape and Le Rhone engines under Airco's licence. The last wartime aircraft Daimler produced was the Airco DH.10 Amiens bomber when they were building 80 aeroplanes a month. Their own test-ground beside the Daimler factory had been compulsorily purchased to become the main RAF testing ground for aircraft built in the Coventry district.

=== Airco and Aircraft Transport and Travel ===
In February 1920 BSA acquired George Holt Thomas's failing Airco group and placed Airco subsidiary Aircraft Transport and Travel (Air Express) under the responsibility of Searle and Daimler Hire. In November 1920 BSA withdrew its financial support for its Airco subsidiary and AT&T was placed in the hands of a liquidator.

=== Daimler Airway ===
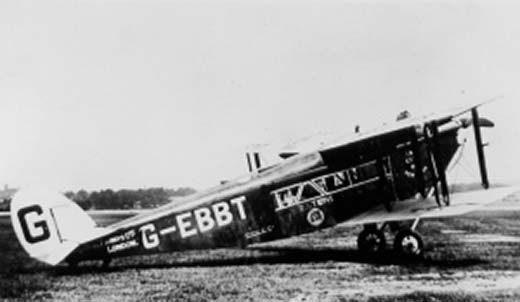
De Havilland DH.34 Daimler Airway livery red and white

In February 1921 those assets needed to form a new business to continue Air Express were purchased from the liquidator (Searle) and combined with Daimler Air Hire to form Daimler Airway LImited. When tenders were called by the Air Ministry for civil air services Searle and Woods Humphery persuaded the BSA-Daimler group to make a tender. It was accepted by the Air Ministry on 9 September 1921.

Searle remained managing director. Major George E Woods Humphery, an engineer and a former RFC pilot and general manager of Handley-Page Transport from June 1919, was appointed manager of Daimler Airway.

Beginning in April 1922 Daimler Airway, became the first company to operate de Havilland DH.34 single-engined cabin biplanes. A total of six were operated, the first (registration G-EBBQ), flying from Croydon Airport London to Paris.

Managing their aircraft as Daimler Hire managed their cars – each to be used a minimum of 20,000 miles a year – Daimler Airway set its standard at 1,000 hours per year per aircraft (later raised at Imperial Airways to 2000 hours a year). This and other control of overheads let Daimler run much more efficiently than its competitors. Their DH34s were good reliable aircraft but in winter heavily muffled passengers missed heating in the cabins.

From October 1922 until early 1924, Daimler Airway operated daily scheduled flights from Alexandra Park Aerodrome Manchester to Croydon Airport London. The northbound flight left Croydon in the late afternoon and the southbound flight departed Alexandra Park during the next morning. This timing enabled passengers from the north of England to connect at Croydon with Daimler's continental schedules.

In 1923 Daimler added further routes from Croydon to Amsterdam, Hanover and Berlin using their DH.34 fleet. This route dealt with floods of passengers. Woods Humphery was to succeed Searle (who was forced out) as general manager of Imperial Airways in 1925.

=== Imperial Airways ===
Daimler Airway merged with Handley Page Transport, Instone Air Line and British Marine Air Navigation into Imperial Airways (IAL) effective 1 April 1924, bringing along its three remaining de Havilland DH.34 aircraft. IAL immediately discontinued Daimler's route to the north of England, the monopoly airline not being interested in serving any UK points outside London. Daimler's Searle and Woods Humphery were respectively appointed Imperial Airways' Managing Director and General Manager. Woods Humphery was to become managing director of Imperial Airways in 1930.

== Accidents and incidents ==
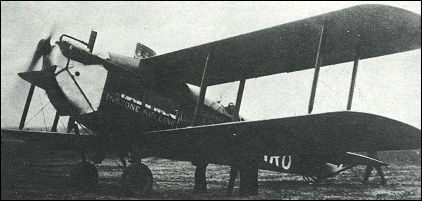
Instone de Havilland DH.18

One de Havilland DH.18A aircraft, (registration G-EAWO) was transferred from Instone Air Line to Daimler Hire Ltd for operation on the Croydon-Paris route until the De Havilland DH.34s that Daimler had on order could be delivered. On 7 April 1922, two days after Daimler commenced operations with the aircraft, it collided with a Compagnie des Grands Express Aériens Farman Goliath (registration F-GEAD) over Picardie, France, 60 miles (97 km) north of Paris. Seven people died in the first mid-air collision between airliners.

As best as could be established each pilot was looking down to follow the Abbeville-Beauvais road, their height matching the downward visibility.

On 14 September 1923, de Havilland DH.34 G-EBBS operating the evening service from Croydon to Manchester crashed near Ivinghoe Beacon, Buckinghamshire, during an attempted forced landing due to bad weather. Pilots Pratt and Robinson and their three passengers were killed. This was the first fatal accident on a UK internal scheduled air service.

== See also ==
- Aviation in the United Kingdom
- History of British Airways
- List of airlines by foundation date
- List of defunct airlines of the United Kingdom
