= De Havilland DH.34 =

1922 airliner series by de Havilland

DH.34
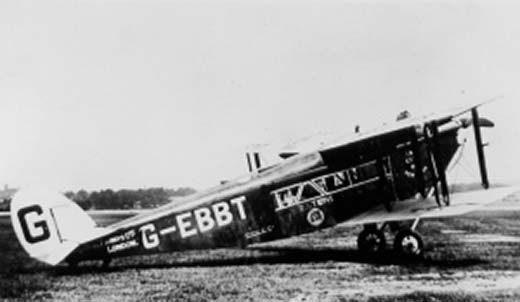

General information
- Type: Airliner
- Manufacturer: de Havilland
- Designer: Geoffrey de Havilland
- Primary users: Imperial Airways Daimler Airway; Instone Air Line
- Number built: 12

History
- Manufactured: 1922
- Introduction date: 1922
- First flight: 26 March 1922
- Retired: 1926

The de Havilland DH.34 was a single engined British biplane airliner built by the de Havilland Aircraft Company in the 1920s. 12 were built, with the DH.34 serving with Imperial Airways and its predecessors for several years.

== Design and development ==
By 1921, enough experience had been gained with operation of the de Havilland DH.18 to realise that aircraft needed to be more efficient to improve the economics of air travel. de Havilland therefore built the ten-passenger DH.29 monoplane, while starting work on the design of the DH.32, a biplane of similar size and capacity to the eight-passenger DH.18, but with a less powerful but more economical Rolls-Royce Eagle engine. Consultation with potential users resulted in work on the DH.29 and DH.32 being stopped and a new airliner, the DH.34 biplane designed, with a similar fuselage to the DH.29, accommodating nine passengers.

The DH.34 had a wooden, plywood-clad fuselage, with the cockpit (for two pilots) being positioned ahead of the wings and the passenger cabin. It had two-bay wooden wings and was powered by a Napier Lion engine, which was fitted for inertia starting, avoiding the necessity for hand swinging of the propeller to start the engine. Unusually, the design of the aircraft allowed an entire spare engine to be carried on board across the rear of the passenger cabin. The cabin door's unusual shape was to allow the engine to be loaded and unloaded, and a specially-fitted 'porthole' on the other side of the cabin would be removed to allow the propeller boss to protrude out the side of the aircraft. Spare engines were not carried routinely (the DH.34's payload was too low to carry both passengers and a spare engine) but this facility was used by operators to quickly fly spare engines out to aircraft that had suffered breakdown.

Two DH.34s were ordered by the Daimler Airway, as part of an initial batch of nine aircraft, with the first prototype (registered G-EBBQ) flying on 26 March 1922. The stalling speed of 63 mph (101 km/h) was too high and was blamed for a fatal crash in 1923, so extensions were fitted to the upper wings, increasing the wingspan from 51 ft 4 in (15.65 m) to 54 ft 4 in (16.56 m), with the revised aircraft designated the DH.34B.

== Operational history ==
The first DH.34 was delivered to Daimler on 31 March 1922 and entered service with Daimler on the Croydon-Paris service on 2 April 1922. Daimler operated a total of six D.H.34s, four of which were leased from the Air Council, with Instone Air Line operating a further four, all leased. One aircraft was built to the order of the Soviet airline Dobrolyot.

When Imperial Airways was formed on 1 April 1924, by the merger of Daimler Airway, Instone Air Line, Handley Page Transport and the British Marine Air Navigation Company, it inherited six D.H.34s, retaining the type in service until March 1926, when it retired the DH.34, abandoning single-engined aircraft in favour of multi-engined aircraft. The Lion engines of the DH.34s were removed and used by Imperial's fleet of Handley Page W.10s.

The DH.34s were used heavily on the cross channel air services, with the fleet flying 8,000 hours in the first nine months of operation, and the second aircraft flying over 100,000 mi (160,000 km) without overhaul. Six D.H.34s were lost in accidents during the four years of their operation, of which several were fatal.

In November 1923 an excellent air safety record for the "English Air Service" was broken by "a disaster in the London-Birmingham air route" when a DH.34 carrying only 3 passengers crashed near the Ivinghoe Beacon near Leighton Buzzard where it was seen to be in difficulties before suddenly nose-diving at high speed into the ground killing all on board.

== Variants ==
DH.34
Initial production version. 11 completed.
DH.34B
Modication of DH.34 with extended upper wing to improve stalling characteristics.

== Operators ==
Soviet Union

- Dobrolyot

United Kingdom

- Daimler Airway
- Imperial Airways
- Instone Air Line

== Accidents and incidents ==
- On 13 August 1922, G-EBBW of Instone Air Line landed at Marden Airfield due to a broken oil pipe. The aircraft was repaired and returned to Croydon.
- On 30 August 1923, G-EBBQ, the first registered DH.34, of Daimler Hire on a flight to Antwerp, crashed at Croydon Airport and was written off. There were no casualties.
- On 14 September 1923, G-EBBS of Daimler Airway crashed at Ivinghoe Beacon, Buckinghamshire whilst on a flight from Croydon to Manchester, Lancashire, killing all five on board.
- On 24 December 1924, G-EBBX of Imperial Airways crashed and caught fire shortly after take-off from Croydon, killing the pilot and all seven passengers.

== Specifications (DH.34) ==
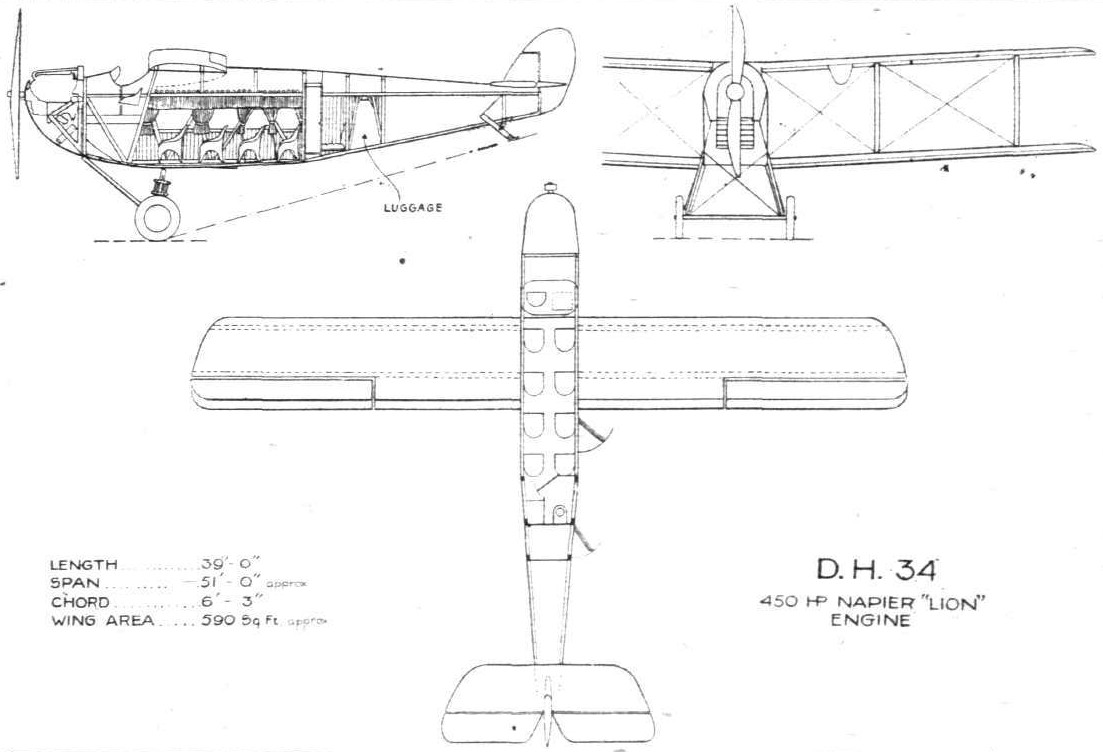
De Havilland DH.34 3-view drawing from Flight, January 5, 1922

Data from The Encyclopedia of World Aircraft

General characteristics

- Crew: Two
- Capacity: 10 passengers
- Length: 39 ft 0 in (11.89 m)
- Wingspan: 51 ft 4 in (15.65 m)
- Height: 12 ft 0 in (3.66 m)
- Wing area: 590 sq ft (55 m^{2})
- Empty weight: 4,574 lb (2,075 kg)
- Gross weight: 7,200 lb (3,266 kg)
- Powerplant: 1 × Napier Lion W-12 water-cooled piston engine, 450 hp (340 kW)
- Propellers: 3-bladed wood fixed-pitch propeller

Performance

- Maximum speed: 128 mph (206 km/h, 111 kn)
- Cruise speed: 105 mph (169 km/h, 91 kn)
- Stall speed: 63 mph (101 km/h, 55 kn)
- Range: 317 mi (510 km, 275 nmi)
- Wing loading: 12.2 lb/sq ft (60 kg/m^{2})
- Power/mass: 0.063 hp/lb (0.104 kW/kg)

== See also ==
- 1922 in aviation

Related development

- DH.29

Aircraft of comparable role, configuration, and era

- Vickers Vulcan

Related lists

- List of de Havilland aircraft
