= AOCE =

AOCE may refer to:

- Apple Open Collaboration Environment, the collection of messaging-related technologies introduced for the Mac OS in the early 1990s

== See also ==
- G-AOCE, a plane registration code; see 1958 Channel Airways de Havilland DH.104 Dove crash
- AOC3, amine oxidase, copper containing 3
