= Le Touquet–Elizabeth II Airport =

Le Touquet–Elizabeth II International Airport Aéroport international Le Touquet-Elizabeth II
- IATA: LTQ; ICAO: LFAT

Summary
- Airport type: Public
- Operator: Société d'economie mixte de l'aéroport du Touquet (SEMAT)
- Serves: Le Touquet, France
- Location: Le Touquet
- Elevation AMSL: 21 ft (6.4 m)
- Coordinates: 50°30′53″N 001°37′39″E
- Website: aeroport-letouquet.com

Maps
- Location of Nord-Pas-de-Calais region in France

- Location of airport in Nord-Pas-de-Calais region

Runways
| Direction | Length | | Surface |
| Direction | m | ft | Surface |
|---|---|---|---|
| 13/31 | 1,850 | 6,070 | Paved |
- Source: French AIP

Le Touquet–Elizabeth II Airport (French: Aéroport Le Touquet–Elizabeth II; IATA: LTQ, ICAO: LFAT) is 2.9 kilometres (1.8 mi) east-southeast of Le Touquet, a commune of the Pas-de-Calais department on the coast of northern France.

The airport was renamed after Queen Elizabeth II following her death in 2022.

The passenger terminal is open 09:00–20:00. There are three flying clubs and most of them also give flying lessons; two of them are helicopter schools and clubs.

== Airlines and destinations ==
As of November 2018, there are no more scheduled services after the only operator, LyddAir, ceased its route to Lydd.

== Accidents and incidents ==
- On 2 May 1981, Aer Lingus Flight 164, a Boeing 737-200 carrying 108 passengers and crew, was hijacked on a flight from Dublin Airport in Ireland to London Heathrow Airport in the United Kingdom. The hijacker had the pilots fly the aircraft to Le Touquet where it then stood for nearly 10 hours before French armed forces troops stormed the aircraft and apprehended the suspect. No one was killed or injured.

== Appearances in media ==
- Le Touquet airport is featured in the Microsoft Flight Simulator X mission Flying Blind Across The Channel, in which the player flies a Cessna 172 from Manston Airport in Kent, UK on a foggy day using instrument flight rules.
