= Ashford Airport =

Ashford Airport can refer to:-

- Lympne Airport, known as Ashford-Lympne Airport from Easter 1968 until its closure in the mid-1970s.
- Lydd - London Ashford Airport, still in operation.
