= 1962 Channel Airways Dakota accident =

Aviation incident in England

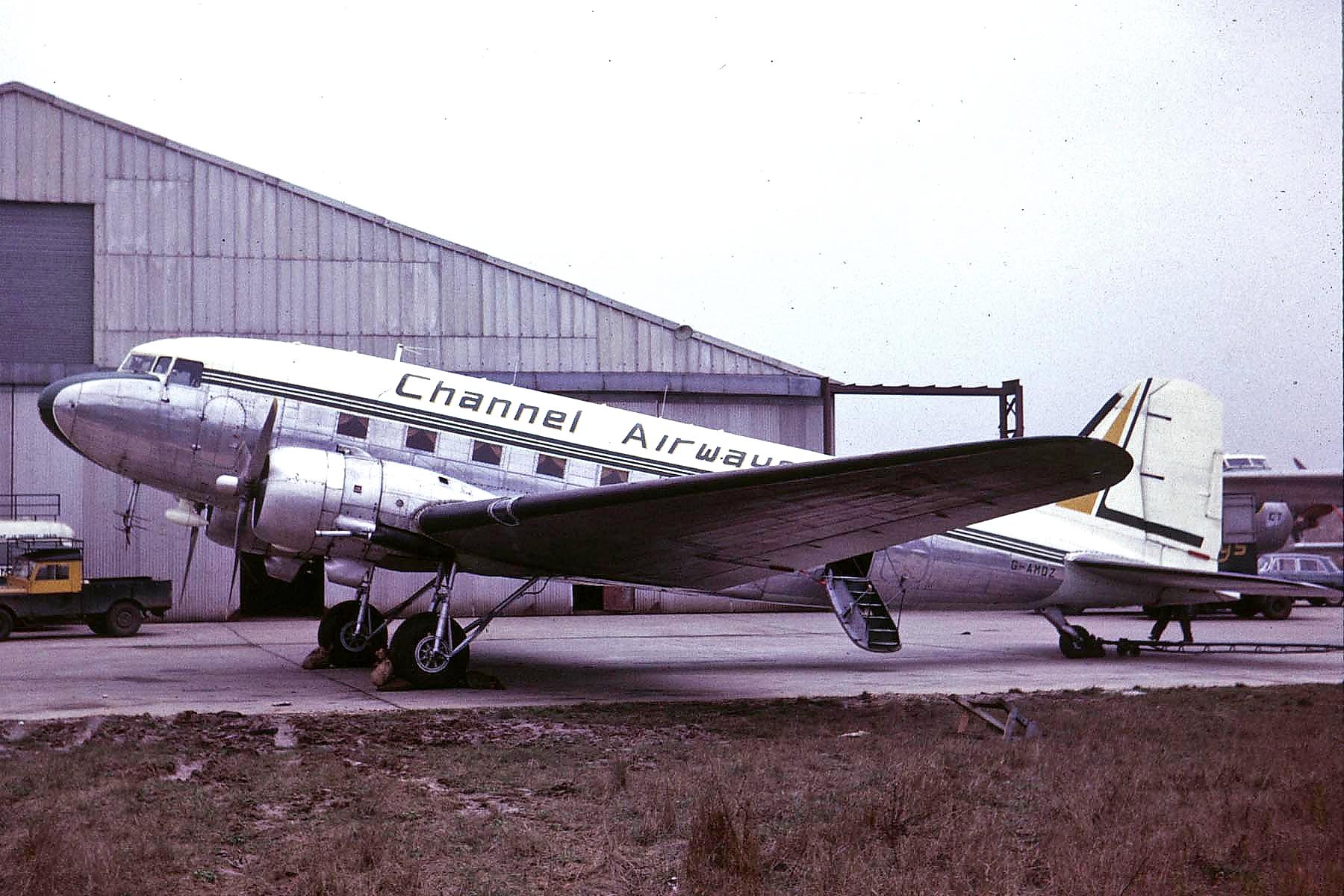
- A similar Douglas C-47

Accident
- Date: 6 May 1962
- Summary: Controlled flight into terrain
- Site: St Boniface Down, Isle of Wight, United Kingdom; 50.6027°N 1.1977°W

Aircraft
- Aircraft type: Douglas C-47A Dakota
- Operator: East Anglian Flying Services trading as Channel Airways
- Registration: G-AGZB
- Flight origin: Jersey Airport, Jersey, Channel Islands
- Destination: Portsmouth Airport, Portsmouth, England
- Passengers: 15
- Crew: 3
- Fatalities: 12
- Survivors: 6

The 1962 Channel Airways Dakota accident occurred on 6 May 1962 when a Channel Airways (Note: The operator was East Anglian Flying Services who operated under the name Channel Airways) Douglas C-47A Dakota, registered G-AGZB and operating a scheduled passenger flight from Jersey to Portsmouth, collided with a cloud-covered hill at St Boniface Down, near Ventnor on the Isle of Wight. The aircraft had previously been owned by British European Airways, and was named "Robert Smith-Barry". The aircraft was destroyed, and twelve of the eighteen occupants were killed (all three crew members and nine out of 15 passengers, including three infants).

== Accident ==
The Dakota was on a scheduled flight from Jersey to Southend with a stop at Portsmouth. There were 15 passengers aboard. With low cloud and drizzle in the Portsmouth/Isle of Wight area, the aircraft notified the controller that they were descending from 3,000 to 1,000 feet. The aircraft was seen flying low over Ventnor just before it crashed, fifty feet below the summit of St Boniface Down and close to a disused Royal Air Force radar site. The aircraft bounced and smashed through a ten-foot high perimeter fence of the radar site and burst into flames. Both pilots and eight of the passengers were killed instantly.

The first man on the scene, a farm worker, helped two badly burned girls from the wreckage. After leading two other men to safety, he ran up the road to find help. There he found a group of seven amateur radio operators broadcasting as G3GWB/p who were taking part in a competition. The radiomen alerted another amateur radio operator in Southampton (G3NIM in Netley), who contacted the emergency services. The seven injured were taken to local hospitals at Ryde and Newport; two of them, a stewardess and a passenger, subsequently died.

== Aftermath ==
A coroner's inquest was opened and then adjourned for two months on the Isle of Wight on 8 May. The Channel Airways chief pilot said it was the company's first fatal accident in 17 years of operation. The coroner paid tribute to those who took part in the rescue operation, and in particular Edward Price, the farmworker who was first on the scene.

== Probable cause ==
The probable cause of the accident was flying below a safe altitude in cloudy, rainy weather.
