= Aer Lingus Flight 164 =

1981 aircraft hijacking in England

Coordinates: 50°30′53″N 001°37′39″E

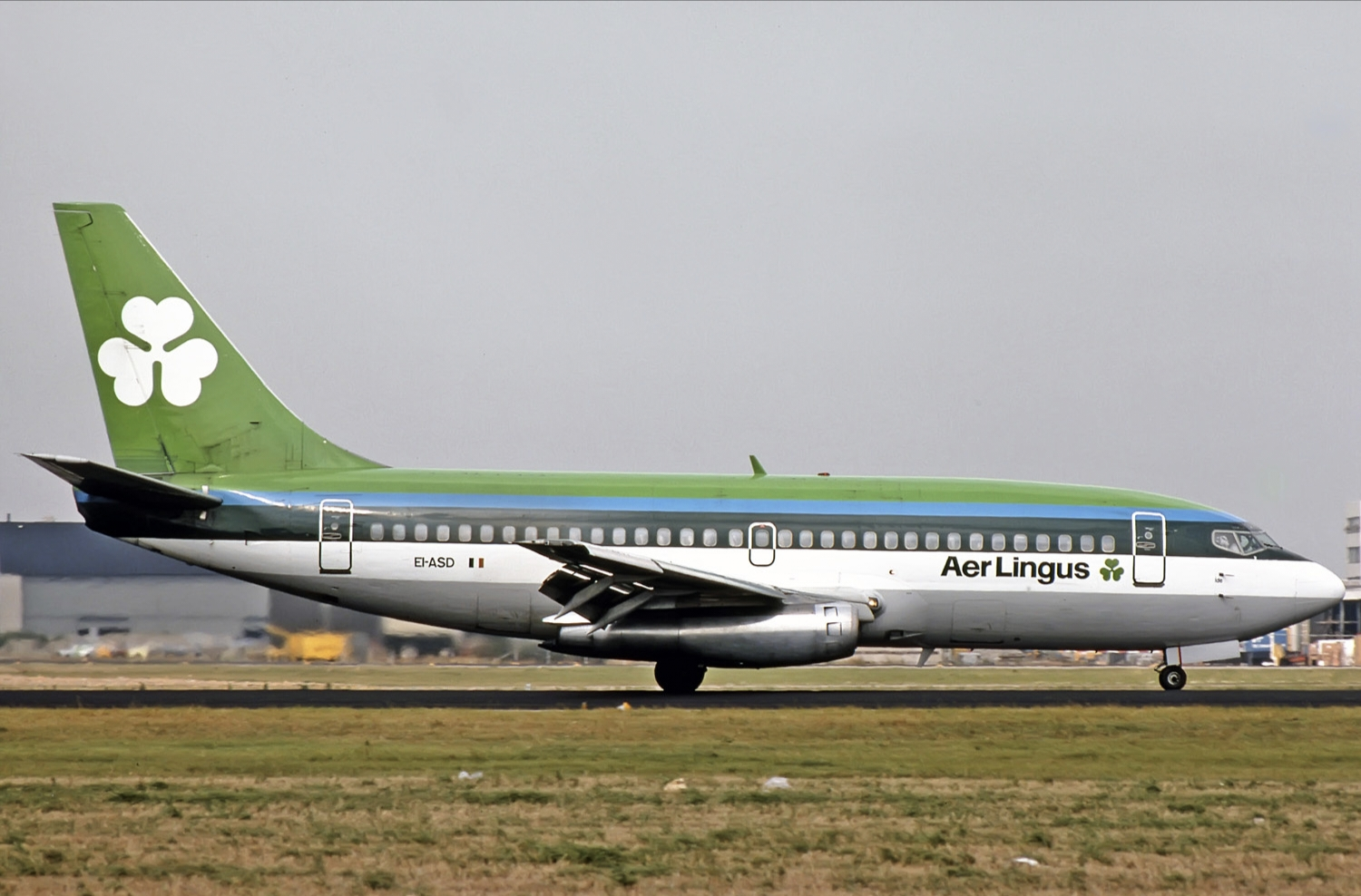
- EI-ASD, the aircraft involved in the hijacking, seen in 1976

Hijacking
- Date: 2 May 1981
- Summary: Hijacking
- Site: London Heathrow Airport

Aircraft
- Aircraft type: Boeing 737-200
- Aircraft name: St. Ita / Íde
- Operator: Aer Lingus
- Registration: EI-ASD
- Flight origin: Dublin
- Destination: London Heathrow
- Occupants: 108
- Passengers: 103
- Crew: 5
- Fatalities: 0
- Survivors: 108

Aer Lingus Flight 164 was a scheduled Boeing 737-200 passenger flight that was hijacked on 2 May 1981, on route from Dublin in Ireland to London in England.

== Hijacking and standoff ==
While on approach to Heathrow, about five minutes before the flight was due to land in England, a 55-year-old Australian man named Laurence James Downey went into the aircraft lavatory and doused himself in petrol. He then went to the cockpit and demanded that the plane continue on to Le Touquet – Côte d'Opale Airport in France and refuel there for a flight to Tehran, Iran. Upon landing at Le Touquet, Downey further demanded the publication in the Irish press of a nine-page statement which he had the captain throw from the cockpit window.

After an eight-hour standoff (during which time Downey released 11 of his 108 hostages), French special forces stormed the plane and apprehended Downey. No shots were fired during the ordeal and nobody was injured.

== Aftermath ==
It was later found out that Downey was being sought by police in Perth, Australia, in connection with a $70,000 land fraud incident, and was also wanted in Shannon, Ireland, for alleged assault. He was sentenced in February 1983, in Saint-Omer, France, to five years' imprisonment for air piracy. Downey was released after only 18 months in prison. He then returned to Australia.

== Hijacker ==
In his statement, Downey claimed to have been a Trappist monk in residence at Tre Fontane Abbey in the 1950s (this was later confirmed by monastery officials), before he was expelled from the order for punching a superior in the face. He then took a job as a tour guide in central Portugal, at a shrine devoted to Our Lady of Fátima, the reported origin of the Three Secrets of Fátima. At the time of the hijacking, the third secret was known only to the Pope and other senior figures in the Catholic Church; Downey's statement called on the Vatican to release this secret to the public.

== Media and popular culture ==
A documentary detailing the incident, Holy Hijacker - Seeking the Third Secret of Fatima, was released in 1999.

The hijacking was later the subject of a comedic play titled A Holy Show.
