= Ipswich Airport =

Airport in Ipswich, England

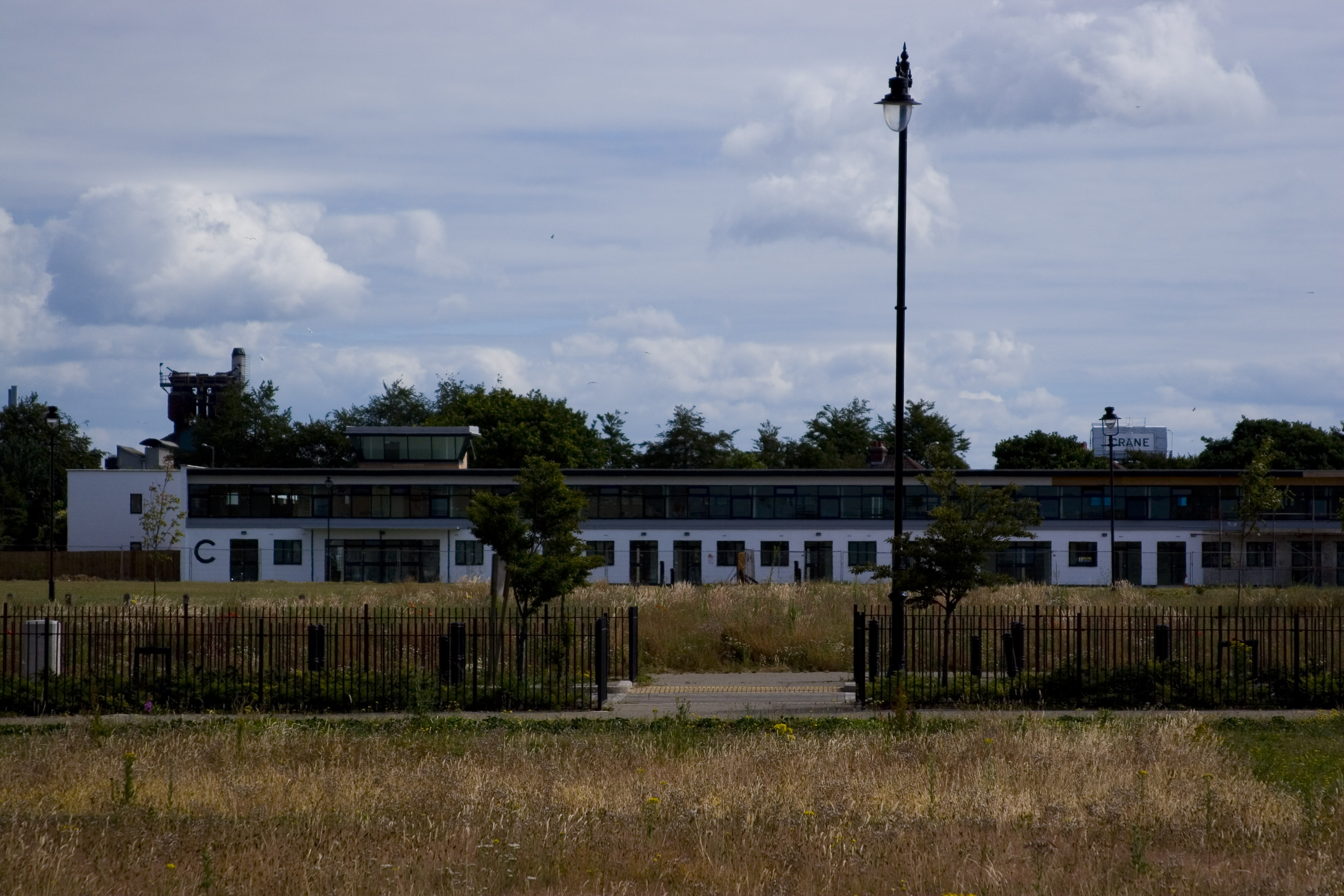
- IATA: ~~IPW~~; ICAO: EGSE

Summary
- Airport type: Defunct
- Location: Ipswich
- Elevation AMSL: 135 ft (41 m)
- Coordinates: 52°01′51″N 001°11′41″E

Map
- Location in Ipswich EGSE (England)

Runways
Direction	Length		Surface
Direction	ft	m	Surface
08/26	4,280	1,305	Grass
14/32	3,840	1,170	Grass

Ipswich Airport (IATA: ~~IPW~~, ICAO: EGSE) was an airfield on the outskirts of Ipswich, Suffolk England. It was known as RAF Nacton when No. 3619 Fighter Control Unit of the Royal Auxiliary Air Force were based there.

== History ==
The site of Ravens Wood 147 acres (59 ha) was purchased by the Ipswich Corporation in 1929 with the intention of creating a municipal airport for Ipswich, with construction starting in the following year. The airport was officially opened by Prince Edward on 26 June 1930, who described the facility as "one of the finest in the country".

In February 1936 the airfield was taken over by the Straight Corporation. They formed Ipswich Airport Ltd to manage it and took over Ipswich Aero Club which was already established at the airfield. The corporation's architects, Hening and Chitty, designed a new terminal building which was opened on 9 May 1938, with an official opening ceremony on 9 July. The building was Grade II listed in 1996; having been described as "very rare and early example of this type of construction".

Southern Airways, another Straight company, operated routes to Clacton and to Ramsgate and Ilford, with a request stop at Southend, mainly using Short Scion aircraft.

In 1938 the Aero Club expanded its training role by taking part in the Civil Air Guard scheme, and on 3 July 1939 No. 37 Elementary and Reserve Flying Training school (E&RFTS) was set up here.

Straight Corporation established an engine workshop in 1939, which worked for their own fleet and also took on outside work.

After the Second World War the airport offered scheduled flights to Southend and Jersey by Channel Airways and later to Amsterdam and Manchester by Suckling Airways. A number of chartered flights were operated by air taxi firm, Hawk Air.

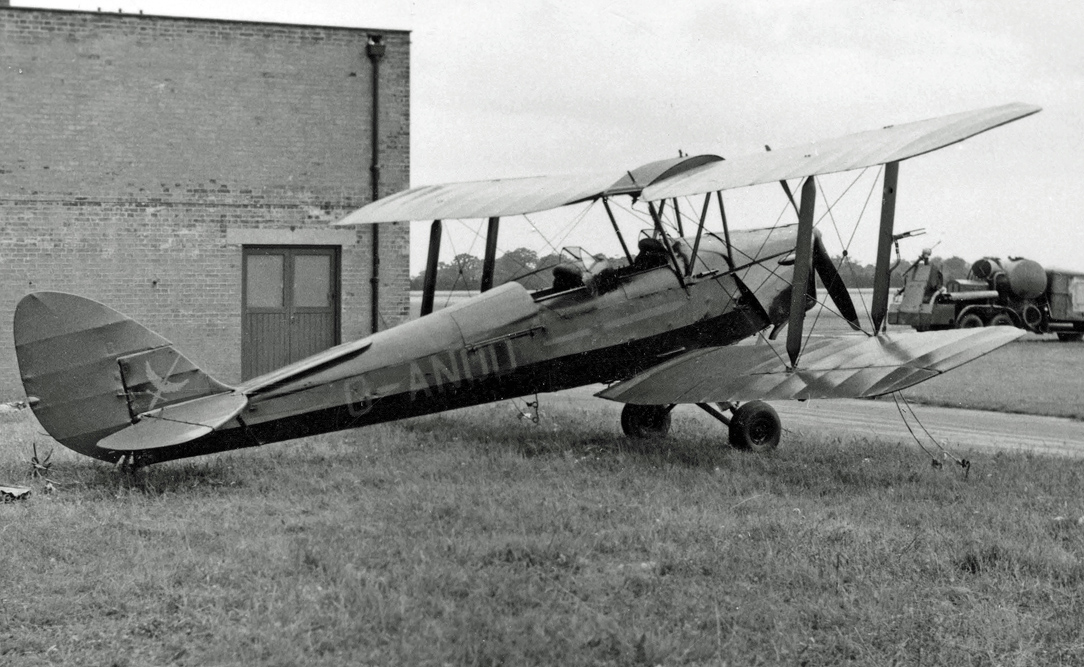
This De Havilland Tiger Moth was based at Ipswich Airport during 1954/55

From its earliest days, the airport was home to a wide variety of privately owned and flying club operated aircraft. Aircraft maintenance services were provided in the 1930-built hangar by a succession of based aviation engineering firms. In the 1980s it was home to a thriving parachuting club.

=== Military ===
The following units were posted here at some point:

- No. 86 Squadron RAF
- No. 107 Squadron RAF
- No. 110 (Hyderabad) Squadron RAF
- No. 129 (Mysore) Squadron RAF
- No. 131 (County of Kent) Squadron RAF
- No. 154 (Motor Industries) Squadron RAF
- No. 268 Squadron RAF
- No. 287 Squadron RAF
- No. 302 Polish Fighter Squadron
- No. 308 Polish Fighter Squadron
- No. 331 (Norwegian) Squadron RAF
- No. 340 (GC IV/2 Île-de-France) Squadron RAF (1942)
- No. 402 Squadron RCAF
- No. 577 Squadron RAF
- No. 611 (West Lancashire) Squadron AAF
- No. 616 (South Yorkshire) Squadron AAF
- No. 652 Squadron RAF
- No. 679 Squadron RAF
- 'H' Flight of No. 1 Anti-Aircraft Co-operation Unit RAF
- No. 3 RAF Regiment Anti-Aircraft Practice Camp (Target Towing) Flight RAF
- No. 7 Anti-Aircraft Co-operation Unit RAF
- No. 8 Anti-Aircraft Co-operation Unit RAF
- No. 8 Blind Approach Training Flight RAF
- No. 45 Elementary and Reserve Flying Training School RAF
- No. 104 Gliding School RAF
- No. 1488 (Fighter) Gunnery Flight RAF
- No. 1499 (Bombing) Gunnery Flight RAF
- No. 1517 (Beam Approach Training) Flight RAF
- No. 1616 (Anti-Aircraft Co-operation) Flight RAF
- No. 1627 (Anti-Aircraft Co-operation) Flight RAF
- No. 1696 (Bomber) Defence Training Flight RAF

== Closure ==
The council, who owned the site, commissioned a development report in 1990 for the site. On the basis of its findings which determined better use of the site for development the Council decided to close the airfield in 1993. This announcement signalled the start of the campaigns to keep the airport operating as such, and it was thought the airport had been saved when the council allowed businesses to stay in operation with rolling leases, and projects to upgrade the air traffic control systems in September 1996.

The airfield was delicensed and ceased to be registered by the Civil Aviation Authority on 31 December 1996. Not through lack of use, nor through public pressure; following the announcement of intention to close by Ipswich Borough Council in late September 1996, there were petitions to keep the site as an operating airport, this culminated with a sit-in which started on 1 January 1997; the last aircraft left over a year later in January 1998.

The site has since been redeveloped as the Ravenswood housing estate; the Grade II listed terminal building was partly demolished to facilitate its conversion into a community centre and flats by Ashwell Property Group. Externally, the building retains some resemblance to the original building.
