= LyddAir =

British passenger airline

IATA	ICAO	Call sign
-	LYD	LYDDAIR
- Founded: 2001
- Commenced operations: June 2002
- Ceased operations: 2018 (only scheduled flights)
- AOC #: 2198
- Operating bases: Lydd
- Fleet size: 2
- Destinations: 0 (Ended scheduled flights)
- Headquarters: Ashford, Kent, England, United Kingdom
- Key people: Jonathan Gordon Managing Director
- Website: www.lyddair.com

LyddAir is a British airline based at Lydd Airport, Kent, United Kingdom. It operated scheduled charter passenger services, air charter and air freight services, as well as an ACMI or fractional ownership programme. It is based at Lydd Airport.

== History ==
Jonathan Gordon had acquired Lydd Airport in June 1996 and a year later started Sky-Trek as a division of his aviation consultancy, Atlantic Bridge Aviation. Scheduled regional cross-channel flights to Le Touquet began on June 20, 1997, with Trislanders. After a slow start, business picked up significantly and the airline began offering inclusive day excursions and short-stay breaks. Around 2000, Sky-Trek began suffering from a falling demand and in November 2000, temporarily suspended operations pending re-organisation.

The carrier was re-launched late in 2001 under the name, LyddAir, and restarted regular daily services again on June 1, 2002. A fleet of Navajo Chieftains was gradually built up to extend operations and eventually replace the Trislanders. These maintained daily summer services between Lydd and Le Touquet, as well being available for more distant charter flights. The airline was wholly owned by South East Airports and had seven employees (at March 2007). In November 2018, it was announced the airline had ended scheduled flights and continue to focus on charter flights only.

== Fleet ==
As of April 2022 the LyddAir fleet includes the following light aircraft:

Aircraft type	In Fleet
Piper Chieftain PA31-350	1
Beechcraft B200 King Air	1
Total	2

== Historical fleet ==
- Beech Jet 400A
