= Vickers Viscount variants =

Medium-range turpoprop airliner variants (1948–1963)

Viscount
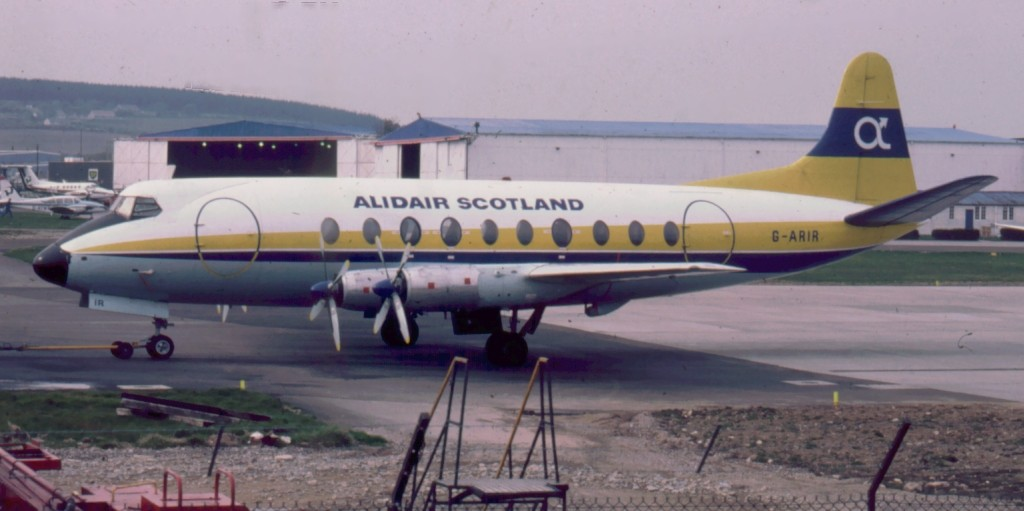
- Viscount 708

General information
- Type: Airliner
- National origin: UK
- Manufacturer: Vickers

History
- Introduction date: 1948
- Retired: 1963

The Vickers Viscount was a medium-range airliner driven by four turboprop engines. The type was designed and manufactured in the United Kingdom from 1948 to 1963.

== Prototypes ==
Type 630
First prototype, with short fuselage (74 ft 6 in (22.71 m), accommodating 32 passengers and powered by four 1,380 ehp (1,032 kW) Rolls-Royce Dart R.Da Mk 501 engines.
Type 663
Second prototype, testbed for Rolls-Royce Tay turbojet.
Type 640
Planned third prototype, powered by four Napier Naiad turboprops. Not built, with parts incorporated in Type 700 prototype.

== Viscount 700 ==
Type 700
The first production version, 1,381 hp (1,030 kW) engines, 287 built, the "D" suffix was used for aircraft powered by the 1,576 hp (1,175 kW) Dart 510 engines.
Type 701
Production aircraft for British European Airways (BEA), the same as the prototype 700 but as in all production aircraft the engines were moved 18 inches outboard to reduce cabin noise level. Originally fitted with Dart 505 engines but later changed to Dart 506s. Originally had a either 40 or 47 seats but this was changed in the 1960s to seat either 60 or 63 passengers, 27 built, first delivered in January 1953.
Type 702
Production aircraft for British West Indian Airways (BWIA) with Dart 506 with 44 or 53 seats, four built, first delivered in June 1955.
Type 703
Proposed 53-seat variant, not built.
Type 707
Production aircraft for the first export customer Aer Lingus with Dart 505s (later Dart 506s) and 53 seats, four built, first delivered in March 1954.
Type 708
Production aircraft for Air France with Dart 505s (later Dart 506s) and 49 seats, 12 built, first delivered in May 1953.
Type 720
Production aircraft for Trans Australia Airlines (TAA) with Dart 505s (later Dart 506s) and 49 seats, 12 built, fitted with slipper tanks for an extra 290 imp gal (350 US gal; 1,300 L) of fuel, seven built, first delivered in October 1955.
Type 723
Production aircraft for the Indian Air Force with Dart 506s and a VIP interior, one built, delivered in December 1955.
Type 724
Production aircraft for Trans-Canada Air Lines (TCA) of Canada with Dart 506s, included increased electrical power, new fuel system, and cold-weather operation provisions (ice-guard panels of fuselage and anti-skid brakes). Fitted with 44 or 48 seats, 15 built, first delivered in December 1954.
Type 728
Production variant for Cyprus Airways and Aden Airways with Dart 506s, not built.
Type 730
Production aircraft for Indian Air Force, same as the Type 723 but with a different VIP interior, one built, delivered in January 1956.
Type 731
Production variant for KLM with Dart 506 engines, not built.
Type 732
Production aircraft for Hunting Clan with Dart 506s, fitted with slipper tanks and 52-seat interior, three built, first delivered in May 1955.
Type 734
Production aircraft for Pakistan Air Force with Dart 506s, fitted with slipper tanks and VIP interior, delivered in March 1956.
Type 735
Production aircraft for Iraqi Airways with Dart 506s and either 44 or 53 seats, three built, first delivered in October 1955.
Type 736
Production aircraft for Fred. Olsen & Co. with Dart 506s and 48 seats, two built, first delivered in November 1955.
Type 737
Production aircraft for the Canadian Department of Transport with Dart 506s and VIP interior, one built, delivered in March 1955.
Type 738
Design for a special duty variant with Dart 506s, not built.
Type 739
Production aircraft for Misrair with Dart 506s and 40 seats, six built, first delivered in December 1955.
Type 740
Design for a staff variant with Dart 506s, not built.
Type 741
Design for a VVIP variant with Dart 506s, not built.
Type 742
Production aircraft ordered by Braathens-SAFE but delivered to the Brazilian Air Force in November 1956 with Dart 510s, VIP interior and slipper tanks.
Type 744
Production variant for Capital Airlines with Dart 506s and 48 seats, three built, first delivered in June 1955.
Type 745
Production aircraft for US airline Capital Airlines. The first nine used Dart 506s; the remainder had Dart 510s. Aircraft had 48 seats and a forward integral airstair, 60 built, first delivered in November 1955.
Type 747
Production aircraft for Butler Air Transport with Dart 506s and 40 seats, two built, first delivered in September 1955.
Type 748
Production aircraft for Central African Airways with Dart 506 engines, 47 seats and slipper tanks, five built, first delivered in May 1956.
Type 749
Production variant for LAV with Dart 506s and 40 seats, three built, first delivered in February 1956.
Type 754
Production variant for Middle East Airlines with Dart 510 engines and 44 or 48 seats, eight built, first delivered in July 1957.
Type 755
Production variant for Airwork Services with Dart 510 engines and 48 seats. The order was canceled and the units were sold to Cubana; three built, first delivered in May 1956.
Type 756
Production variant for Trans Australia Airlines with Dart 510 engines, 44 seats and slipper tanks, seven built, first delivered in June 1956.
Type 757
Production variant for Trans-Canada Air Lines similar to the Type 724 but with upgraded 1,600 hp (1,120 kW) Dart 510 engines, 35 built, first delivered in March 1956.
Type 759
Production variant ordered by Hunting Clan with Dart 510 engines, 40 or 44 seats and slipper tanks, two built delivered to Icelandair from November 1956.
Type 760
Production variant for Hong Kong Airlines with Dart 510 engines, 40 or 44 seats and slipper tanks, two built, first delivered in January 1957.
Type 761
Production variant for Union of Burma Airlines with Dart 510 engines and 48 seats, three built, first delivered in July 1957.
Type 762
Design for an executive variant with Dart 510s, not built.
Type 763
Production variant for Howard Hughes with Dart 510 engines and 48 seats, one built, delivered to TACA Airlines in October 1958.
Type 764
Production variant for the United States Steel Corporation with Dart 510 engines, VIP interior and both slipper tanks and a 450 gallon belly tank, three built; first delivered in December 1956.
Type 765
Production variant for the Standard Oil (ESSO) Corporation similar to the Type 764. One built, delivered in 1957.
Type 767
Production variant for Aden Airways with Dart 510s, not built.
Type 768
Production variant for the Indian Airlines Corporation with Dart 510s and 44 seats, ten built, first delivered in August 1957.
Type 769
Production variant for PLUNA with Dart 510s, 48 seats and slipper tanks, three built, first delivered in May 1958.
Type 770
Basic design for the Type 700D for the United States, not built.
Type 771
Basic design standard based on the 745, not built.
Type 772
Production variant for British West Indian Airways (BWIA) with Dart 506 engines and 48 seats, four built, first delivered in October 1957.
Type 773

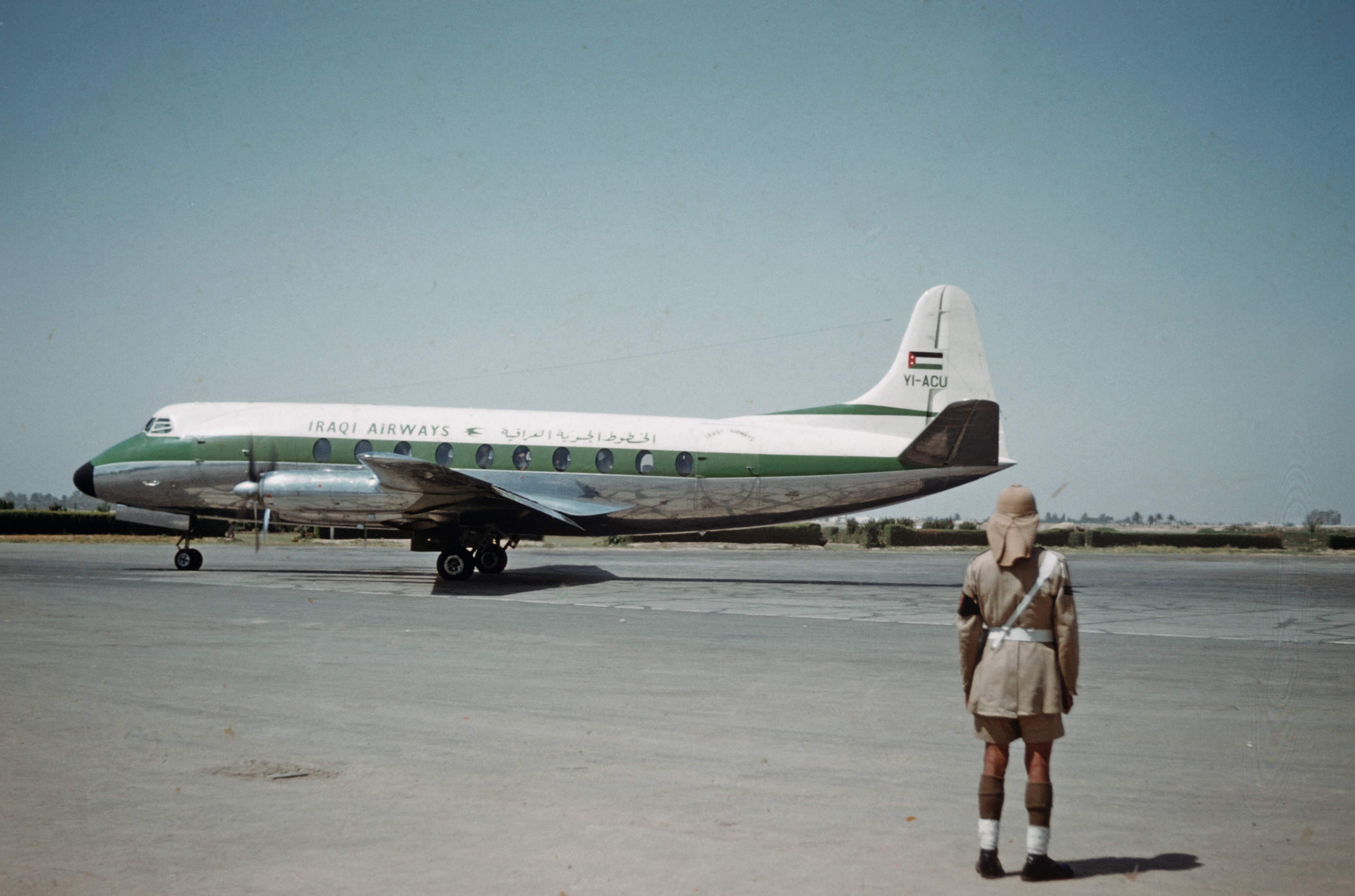
Vickers 773 Viscount in about 1958

Production variant for Iraqi Airways with Dart 506 engines and 48 seats, one built, delivered in November 1957.
Type 774
Production variant for Saudi Arabia with Dart 510s, not built.
Type 775
Production variant for Yugoslavia with Dart 510s, not built.
Type 776
Production variant for Kuwait Airlines with Dart 510s, one converted from a Type 745 in 1958.
Type 777
Basic design with Dart 510s, not built.
Type 778
Production variant with Dart 510s for Chile, not built.
Type 779
Production variant for Fred Olsen with Dart 510 engines and 48-seats, four built, first delivered in April 1957.
Type 780
Basic design standard for with Dart 510s and VIP interior, not built.
Type 781
Production variant for South African Air Force with Dart 510 engines, a VIP interior and slipper tanks, one built, delivered in June 1958.
Type 782
Production variant for Iranian Airways with Dart 510s and 48 seats, three built with the first delivery in March 1958. Were convertible to VIP interior for the Shah of Persia.
Type 783
Production variant for LAC with Dart 510s, not built.
Type 784
Production variant for Philippine Air Lines with Dart 510s, 48 seats and slipper tanks, three built, first delivered in May 1957.
Type 785
Production variant for LAI-Alitalia with Dart 510s and 48 seats, three built, first delivered in March 1957.
Type 786
Production variant for Lloyd Aereo Colombiano with Dart 510 engines, 48 seats and both slipper and belly tanks, three built, first delivered in August 1957.
Type 787
Production variant for Iraqi Airways with Dart 510 engines, not built.
Type 788
Production variant for Syrian Airways with Dart 510 engines, not built.
Type 789
Production variant for the Brazilian Air Force with Dart 510 engines, slipper and belly tanks, and VIP interior. One was built; delivered in December 1957.
Type 790
Basic design for local service variant with Dart 506 engines, not built.
Type 791
Production variant for Avianca with Dart 506 engines, not built.
Type 792
Production variant for Pakistan with Dart 506 engines and VIP interior, not built.
Type 793
Production variant for the Royal Bank of Canada with Dart 510 engines and a VIP interior, one built.
Type 794
Production variant for THY (Turkish Airlines) with Dart 510s and 48 seats, four built, first delivered in January 1958.
Type 795
Production variant for Trans World Airlines (TWA) with Dart 510 engines, not built.
Type 796
Production variant for Turkish Air Force with Dart 510 engines and VIP interior, not built.
Type 797
Production variant for Canadian Department of Transportation with Dart 510 engines, one built, delivered in March 1958.
Type 798
Production variant for Northeast Airlines with Dart 510s, eight built.

== Viscount 800 ==
Improved variant with the fuselage extended by 3 ft 10 in (1.2 m), 67 built

Type 800
Basic design, not built.
Type 801
Production variant for British European Airways with Dart 510s, changed to Dart 520s as Type 802.
Type 802
First production variant of the 800 series for British European Airways with Dart 510 engines and either 53 or 57 seats, 24 built, first delivered in February 1957.
Type 803
Production variant for KLM with Dart 510 engine and 53 seats, nine built, first delivered in June 1957.
Type 804
Production variant for Transair (Canada) with Dart 510 engines and 65 seats, three built, first delivered in September 1957.
Type 805
Production variant for Eagle Airways with Dart 510 engines and 70 seats, two built, first delivered in December 1957.
Type 806
Production variant for British European Airways with Dart 520 engines and 58 seats, 19 built, first delivered in March 1958. Nine aircraft were later converted to Type 802 when the Dart 520s were changed for Dart 510s so the 520s could be used in the airline's Argosy freighters.
Type 807
Production variant for the New Zealand National Airways Corporation with Dart 510 engines and 60 seats, four built, first delivered in December 1957.
Type 808
Production variant for Aer Lingus with Dart 510 engines and 70 seats, six built, first delivered in May 1957.
Type 809
Production variant for Greece, not built.

== Viscount 810 ==
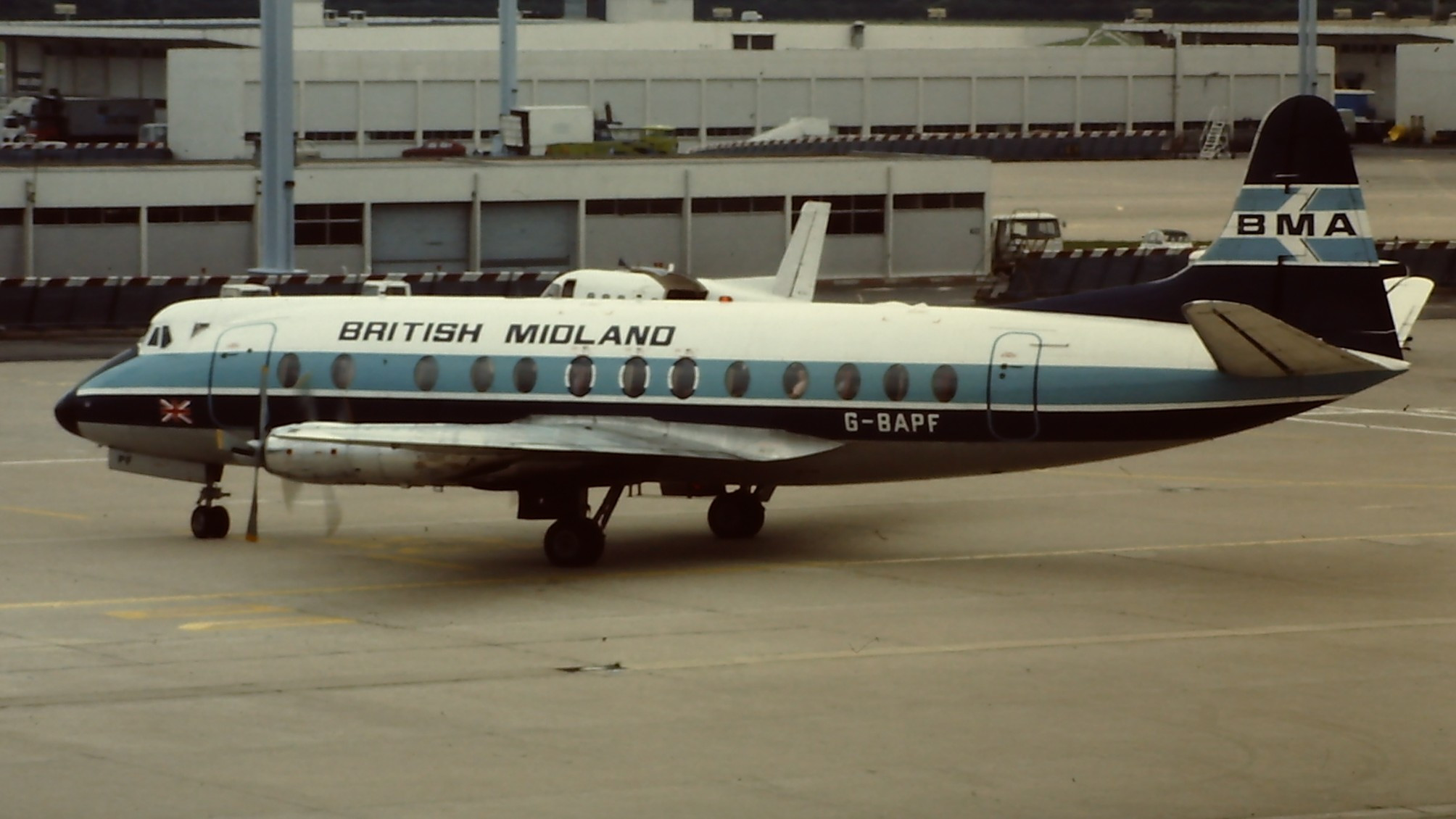
Viscount 814

Improved longer-range variant with 1,991 hp (1,485 kW) Dart 525 engines, 84 built

Type 810
Prototype for the improved 810 series with Dart 525 engines and a 52-seat interior with an additional four-seat rear lounge, one built and first flown on 23 December 1957.
Type 811
Production variant for Capital Airlines with Dart 525 engines, not built.
Type 812
Production variant for Continental Airlines with Dart 525 engines, 52 seats with an additional four-seat rear lounge and integral airstair, 15 built, first delivered in May 1958.
Type 813
Production variant for South African Airways with Dart 525 engines (later changed to Dart 530s), 56 seats and four-seat rear lounge, seven built, first delivered in October 1958.
Type 814
Production variant for Lufthansa with Dart 525 engines and 64 seats, eleven built, first delivered in October 1958.
Type 815
Production variant for Pakistan International Airlines with Dart 525 engines and 51 seats, five built, first delivered in January 1959.
Type 816
Production variant for Trans Australia Airlines with Dart 525 engines and 56 seats, two built, first delivered in March 1959.
Type 817
Production variant for Avensa with Dart 525 engines, not built.
Type 818
Production variant for Cubana with Dart 525 engines and 52 seats, four built, first delivered in October 1958.
Type 819
Production variant for Aviacon with Dart 525 engines, not built.
Type 820
Production variant for American Airlines with Dart 525 engines, not built.
Type 821
Production variant for Eagle with Dart 525 engines, not built.
Type 822
Production variant for LAV with Dart 525 engines, not built.
Type 823
Production variant for California Eastern with Dart 525 engines, not built.
Type 824
Production variant for LAI Dart 525 engines, not built.
Type 825
Production variant for Black Lion Aviation with Dart 525 engines, not built.
Type 826
Production variant for Agile Azur with Dart 525 engines, not built.
Type 827
Production variant for VASP with Dart 525 engines and 56 seats including four-seat rear lounge, six built, first delivered in October 1958.
Type 828
Production variant for All Nippon Airways (ANA) with Dart 525 engines and 60 seats, nine built, first delivered in July 1961. Unusual for the time they had television sets mounted on hat-racks for in-flight viewing.
Type 829
Production variant for TAP with Dart 525 engines, not built.
Type 830
Proposed large-fuselage variant for American Airlines with Dart 525 engines, not built.
Type 831
Production variant for Airwork and Sudan Airways with Dart 525 engines and 60 seats, three built, first delivered in July 1961.
Type 832
Production variant for Ansett-ANA with Dart 525 engines and 56 seats including a four-seat rear lounge, four built, first delivered in March 1959.
Type 833
Production variant for Hunting Clan with Dart 530 engines, three built, first delivered in June 1959.
Type 834
Production variant for LOT Polish Airlines with Dart 525 engines, not built.
Type 835
Conversion of a not-delivered Type 818 originally for Cubana, delivered in September 1959 for the Tennessee Gas Transmission Corporation.
Type 836
Conversion of a not-delivered Type 816 originally for Trans Australia Airlines, delivered in May 1960 to Union Carbide.
Type 837
Production variant for Austrian Airlines with Dart 525 engines and either 56 seats (mixed-class) or 66 seats (tourist-class) and a four-seat rear lounge, six built, first delivered in August 1960.
Type 838
Production variant for Ghana Airways with Dart 525 engines and 60 seats, three built, first delivered in June 1961.
Type 839
Production variant for the Iranian Government with VIP interior, one delivered in February 1960.
Type 840
Basic design with Dart 541s, not built.
Type 841
Production variant for British European Airways with Dart 541s, not built.
Type 842
Production variant for Iraqi Airways with Dart 541s, not built.
Type 843
Production variant for CAAC with Dart 525 engines and 52 seats, six built, first delivered in October 1963. The last delivery and the last Viscount to be delivered in April 1964.
Type 845
Production variant for Pakistan International with Dart 525s, not built.

== Proposals ==
Type 850
Viscount Major project, not built.
Type 870
Improved second-generation variant, developed as the Vickers Vanguard.
