= 1958 Channel Airways de Havilland DH.104 Dove crash =

1958 aviation accident

Coordinates: 50°55′26″N 0°58′10″E

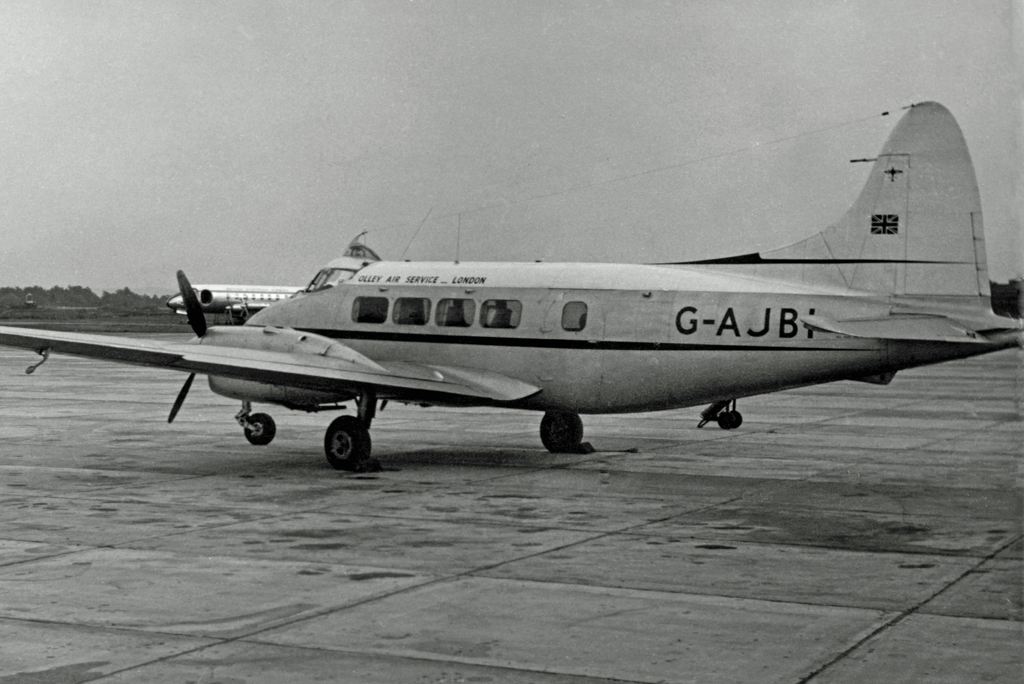
- A DH.104 Dove, similar to the accident aircraft.

Accident
- Date: 15 January 1958
- Summary: Fuel starvation due to pilot error
- Site: Dungeness, Kent

Aircraft
- Aircraft type: de Havilland DH.104 Dove 1
- Operator: Channel Airways
- Registration: G-AOCE
- Flight origin: Zestienhoven Airport, Rotterdam, Netherlands
- Destination: Southend Airport, Essex, United Kingdom (scheduled); Ferryfield Airport, Lydd, Kent (attempted diversion)
- Occupants: 7
- Passengers: 5
- Crew: 2
- Fatalities: 0
- Injuries: 1
- Survivors: 7

The 1958 Channel Airways de Havilland DH.104 Dove crash occurred on 15 January 1958, when a de Havilland DH.104 Dove of Channel Airways crashed on approach to Ferryfield Airport, Lydd, Kent due to mismanagement of the aircraft's fuel system by the pilot. All seven people on board survived, but the aircraft was written off.

== Aircraft ==
The accident aircraft was a de Havilland DH.104 Dove 1, registered G-AOCE. The aircraft had been manufactured in August 1947 and was originally delivered to another airline, which sold it to Channel Airways in June 1955. At the time of the accident, it had reached a total of 8,680 flying hours in service. This aircraft had operated the first flight by Channel Airways from Rotterdam to Southend.

== Accident flight ==
The aircraft was operating an international scheduled passenger flight from the Netherlands to the United Kingdom. The flight was scheduled to depart from Rotterdam's Zestienhoven Airport and land at Southend Airport in the county of Essex. The weather at Zestienhoven was foggy, and it was reported that the situation at Southend was the same. The flight was delayed departing from Zestienhoven. When it eventually departed, it was carrying two crew and five passengers. Due to fog at Southend, it was decided to divert to Lydd Ferryfield, an airport in the county of Kent.

Two attempts were made to land at Ferryfield, but a go-around was performed each time on instructions from the airport operator. On the third approach, the starboard engine spluttered and stopped, followed shortly after by the port engine. The aircraft crashed on the shingle beach at Dungeness, 1,200 yards (1,100 m) north of Dungeness Lighthouse. The nose of the aircraft was severely damaged and the starboard wing had been ripped off. All on board escaped, although the pilot suffered moderate injuries. The passengers were taken to the Ferryfield, where they were given a meal and interviewed by the Kent police before being provided with transport home.

== Investigation ==
The accident was investigated by the Accidents Investigation Branch, which found that the port fuel tank had plenty of fuel, but the starboard tank was empty. The engines failed at a critical point of the approach to land, giving the pilot insufficient time to evaluate the situation. Mismanagement of the fuel system (leading to fuel starvation) was the cause of the accident.
