= Lydd Airport =

Airport in Kent, England

Lydd International Airport

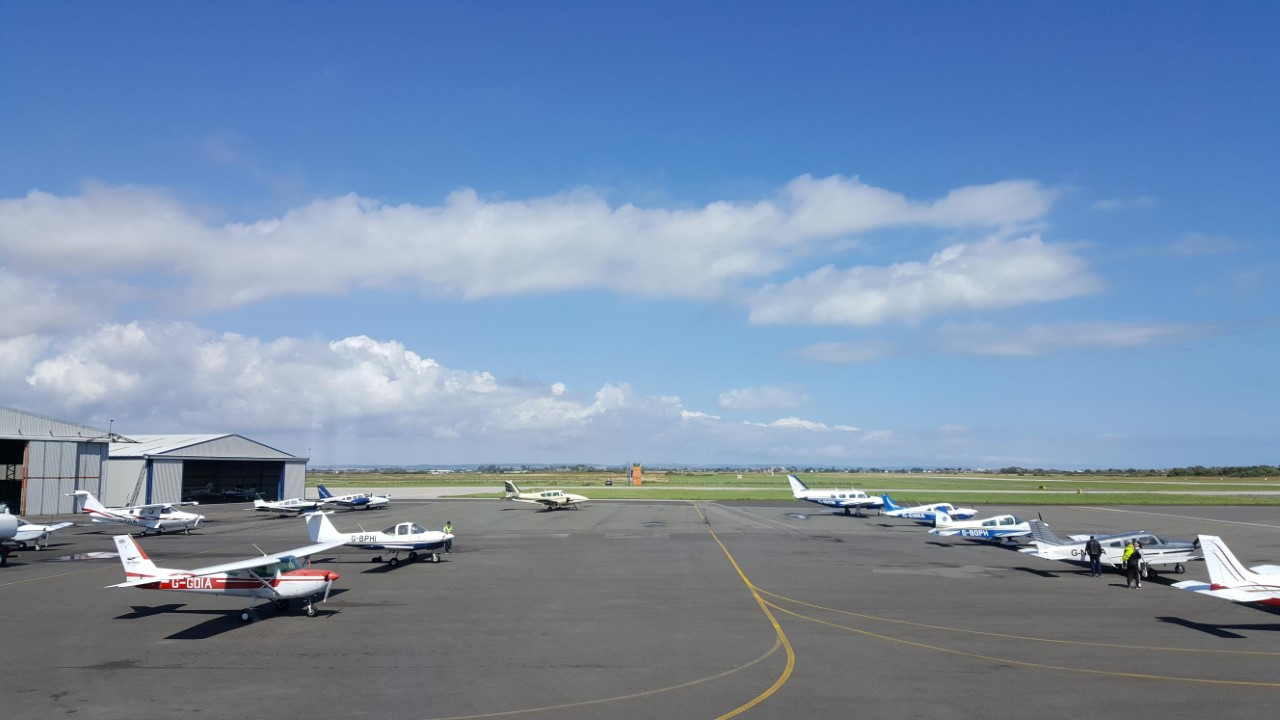
- LAA runway
- IATA: LYX; ICAO: EGMD

Summary
- Airport type: Public
- Operator: London Ashford Airport Ltd.
- Serves: London, East Sussex and Kent
- Location: Lydd, Kent, England
- Elevation AMSL: 13 ft (4.0 m)
- Coordinates: 50°57′22″N 000°56′21″E
- Website: www.lyddairport.co.uk

Map
- Location in Kent

Runways
Direction	Length		Surface
Direction	m	ft	Surface
03/21	1,505	4,938	Grooved asphalt

Statistics (2017)
- Passengers: 285
- Sources: UK AIP at NATS; Statistics from the UK Civil Aviation Authority

Lydd Airport (IATA: LYX, ICAO: EGMD) is an operational general aviation and minor commercial airport located 1 NM (1.9 km; 1.2 mi) east of the town of Lydd and 12 NM (22 km; 14 mi) south of Ashford in the district of Folkestone and Hythe, in Kent, England. Originally named Lydd Ferryfield, it was also previously known as London Ashford Airport. The airport is operated by London Ashford Airport Ltd, which is controlled by the family of Saudi businessman Fahad Al Athlel.

Lydd Airport has a CAA Ordinary Licence (Number P858) that allows flights for the public transport of passengers or for flying instruction as authorised by the licensee (London Ashford Airport Limited). The airport is currently not able to handle aircraft up to the size of a Boeing 737 or Airbus A319 but permission was granted in 2013 to extend the runway by 294 metres (965 ft) to allow for them. Lydd Air is based at the airport, and had regular flights to Le Touquet Airport in northern France, a service which ended in December 2018.

The airport lies adjacent to the unique landscape of Dungeness, a cuspate foreland that is one of the largest expanses of shingle beach in Europe and which is of international conservation importance for its geomorphology, plant and invertebrate communities and birdlife, a fact that is recognised by its designations as a national nature reserve, a Special Protection Area, a Special Area of Conservation and part of the Site of Special Scientific Interest of Dungeness, Romney Marsh and Rye Bay. This proximity led to strong opposition to plans to expand. The local planning authority granted permission with conditions to build a 294 m (965 ft) runway extension and a new terminal building in 2012. This will allow it to handle fully loaded Boeing 737 or Airbus A319 aircraft.

== History ==
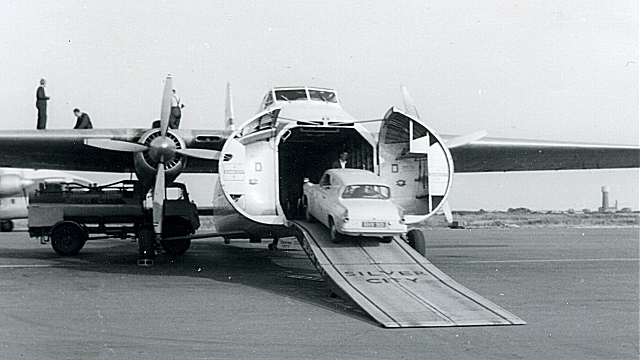
Loading a Bristol Superfreighter air ferry at Lydd in 1960

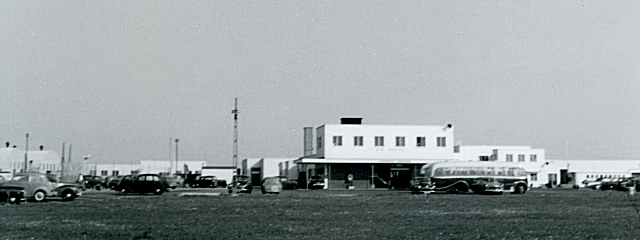
Lydd Airport in 1960

Lydd Airport, opened in 1954, was the first airport to be built in the UK following the end of the Second World War, and it was built for Silver City Airways as an all-weather replacement operating base to that of nearby Lympne Airport, whose grass runway was often waterlogged in rainy weather. The new Lydd Ferryfield was, like Lympne, used initially for car carrying air ferry services using Bristol Freighters, operating principally to Le Touquet in France. Within five years of opening, it was handling over 250,000 passengers annually, making it one of the busiest airports in the UK.

Silver City Airways subsequently became part of British United Air Ferries (BUAF), under the same ownership as British United Airways (BUA). The airlines used Bristol Freighters, Superfreighters and Aviation Traders Carvair aircraft on their car-carrying routes from Lydd. However the introduction of roll-on/roll-off ferries and hovercraft on cross-channel services led to a decline of the air ferry services from Lydd.

The Skyways cargo operation (that survived Dan-Air's takeover of Skyways International's passenger operations in February 1972) used three DC-3s from Air Freight Ltd which it had acquired from Skyways Air Cargo, the defunct airline's cargo subsidiary, in 1970.

Following Skyways Coach-Air's liquidation in early 1971, Air Freight initially continued the former Skyways Air Cargo operation under its own name and, in February 1973, merged with South West Aviation.

The closure of Ashford Airport in 1974 resulted in the relocation of Air Freight's headquarters and operating base to nearby Lydd Airport, where it operated using both DC-3s for cargo and Fairchild Hiller FH-227 turboprops for combined passenger and cargo operations across the UK, Channel Islands and Europe (mainly Amsterdam and Paris).

During the 1980s the airport was bought by Hards Travel from Solihull, who used the airport (along with Coventry Airport) as its base for its holiday operations to Spain, Italy and Austria, using Dart Herald and Viscount aircraft flying to Ostend in Belgium and Beauvais in France, where customers were transferred to coaches for the remainder of the journey. During this time Hards operated 14 flights a day from the airport, and used the large fields surrounding the airport for car parking. The main brand Hards traded under was Summer-Plan, and in the winter Ski-Plan, as well as HTS Holidays.

Expansion of the airport was approved in 2014 following a legal challenge by Royal Society for the Protection of Birds (RSPB) and the Lydd Airport Action (LAAG) Group. This includes a runway extension of almost 300 m (980 ft) and a new terminal building. Including measures to offset environmental detriment, it is costed at £25 million.

On 9 July 2015, the Airbus E-Fan took off from Lydd Airport for a flight to Calais-Dunkerque Airport. Initially this was claimed as the first electric aircraft to cross the English Channel, but it has since been pointed out that there were previous such flights, including one as long ago as 1981.

The airport features at the end of the 1961 Hammer film A Weekend with Lulu, starring Bob Monkhouse, Leslie Phillips, Irene Handl and Shirley Eaton. and in Two for the Road (1967) with Albert Finney and Audrey Hepburn.

Between June 1997 and November 2018 the airport's only scheduled flights were operated by LyddAir. However, in November 2018 the airline altered operations to charter only.

== Current use ==
Since November 2018, after LyddAir ceased its sole route to Le Touquet – Côte d'Opale Airport, there are no scheduled services. LyddAir now only operates a charter service from the airport.

In 2015, Bristow Helicopters started using the airport as a search and rescue (SAR) base on behalf of HM Coastguard, operating the AgustaWestland AW189, and later changing to the AgustaWestland AW139. As of January 2026 however, this is no longer the case, due to a disagreement over fees; Bristow now operates Coastguard 363 from various other locations including their SAR base at Solent Airport, and a forward operating base at Manston Airport.

== Accidents and incidents ==
- On 15 January 1958, de Havilland Dove G-AOCE of Channel Airways crashed at Dungeness whilst attempting to land at Ferryfield. The accident was due to a double engine failure caused by mismanagement of the aircraft's fuel system by the pilot. All seven people on board survived.
- On 17 August 1978, Douglas C-47B G-AMSM of Skyways Cargo Airline was damaged beyond economic repair in a take-off accident.

== See also ==
- List of airports in the United Kingdom
