= Sandy Glen =

- Born: Sir Alexander Richard Glen; 18 April 1912
- Died: 6 March 2004
- Education: Fettes College
- Alma mater: Balliol College, Oxford
- Occupation(s): Intelligence officer and explorer

Sir Alexander Richard Glen KBE DSC (April 18 1912 – march 6 2004) was a Scottish explorer of the Arctic, and wartime intelligence officer. He later invested in the shipping industry, employed Tom Gullick who was a pioneer of package holidays, and became chairman of the British Tourist Authority.

He was appointed CBE in 1964 and KBE in 1967.

== Early life ==
Born in Glasgow, Glen was the son of a Glasgow shipowner and educated at Fettes College and read Geography at Balliol College, Oxford. He married Nina Gladys Nixon, daughter of Brinsley Hampton Nixon, in Chelsea in 1937; they had one son - Adrian Martin de Courcy Glen (1939–1983).

== Arctic exploration ==
Glen first travelled to the Arctic as crew on a fishing boat owned by a Cambridge law don, and spent two months surveying in the mountains.

The next year, he led his own 16-man Oxford University summer expedition which included Hugh Lygon who also invited Evelyn Waugh (who nearly drowned when a glacier thawed), and in the winter spent some months with the Sámi of northern Sweden, then in the following summer, returned to Spitsbergen for a few weeks.

In 1935 the 23-year-old Glen led an Oxford University expedition which established a station on the icecap of North East Land and carried out research in glaciology, geology and radio propagation in high latitudes. He wrote Under the Pole Star in 1937.

== War service ==
In January 1940 Glen was posted to Belgrade as assistant naval attache at the British legation, but when in March 1941 the 17-year-old Peter II of Yugoslavia participated in a British-supported coup d'état opposing the Tripartite Pact German retribution was swift, and Belgrade was bombed within three days. The British legation left and made their way home via Albania, Italy, unoccupied France and Spain.

He later served with distinction in dangerous clandestine operations in Yugoslavia in support of Josip Broz Tito; and in Albania and Bulgaria. Again Evelyn Waugh was involved in the pro-Tito operation along with Churchill's son Randolph - they were both under Fitzroy Maclean's auspices.

Glen was awarded the DSC - and later a bar - the Norwegian War Cross, the Czechoslovak War Cross and was appointed a Knight of St Olav.

He knew Ian Fleming and is often given as one of the inspirations for James Bond.

== Travel industry ==
He joined a syndicate to buy shipbrokers H Clarkson & Co, a subsidiary of which later became a pioneer of package holidays - Clarksons Holidays. The holiday division was sold in 1972 to Court Line, a shipping company and charter airline, which collapsed in August 1974.

Glen was a director of British European Airways and chairman of the British Tourist Authority from 1969 to 1977.

== Writing ==
- Under the Pole Star, 1937
- Footholds Against A Whirlwind, Hutchinson, London, 1975
- Target Danube, 2002

== Honours and awards ==
- 10 February 1942 - The Polar Medal (Silver) - Lieutenant Alexander Richard Glen, B.A., R.N.V.R. for good services with the Oxford University Arctic Expedition to North East Land in 1935 and 1936.
- 27 October 1942 - Distinguished Service Cross - Acting Lieutenant-Commander Alexander Richard Glen, R.N.V.R. for distinguished services
- 23 March 1943 - Norwegian War Cross - Lieutenant-Commander Alexander Richard Glen, D.S.C., R.N.V.R.
- 9 May 1944 - Royal Norwegian Order of St. Olav - To be a Chevalier of the First Grade of the Order of St. Olav: Acting Lieutenant-Commander Alexander Glen, D.S.C., R.N.V.R.
- 20 February 1945 - Bar to the Distinguished Service Cross - Acting Lieutenant-Commander Alexander Richard Glen, D.S.C., R.N.V.R. For courage and undaunted devotion to duty.
- 1 November 1946 - Czechoslovak War Cross - Acting Lieutenant Commander (Sp.) Alexander Richard Glen, D.S.C., R.N.V.R. bestowed by the President of the Czechoslovak Republic for service to Czechoslovakia during the War.
- 1 January 1964 - Commander of the Order of the British Empire - Alexander Richard Glen, Esq., D.S.C., Chairman, H. Clarkson and Company Ltd.
- 1 January 1967 - Knight Commander of the Order of the British Empire - Alexander Richard Glen, Esq., C.B.E., D.S.C., Chairman, Export Council for Europe, For services to Export.
