= British Caledonian in the 1970s =

- Founded: November 1970
- Ceased operations: 14 April 1988

British Caledonian (BCal) came into being in November 1970 when the Scottish charter airline Caledonian Airways, at the time Britain's second-largest, wholly privately owned, independent (Note: independent from government-owned corporations) airline, took over British United Airways (BUA), then the largest British independent airline as well as the United Kingdom's leading independent scheduled carrier.

The combining of the two companies met government policy for the establishment of a "Second Force" to counterbalance the near-monopoly of the government-owned corporations, which provided 90% of all UK scheduled air transport capacity at the beginning of the decade and to expand the British share of global aviation. This entailed expanding the inherited scheduled network to provide effective competition to established rivals on a number of key routes, as well as augmenting the acquired fleet with the latest generation narrow-, widebody and supersonic transport airliners to maintain a competitive edge.

The rapid expansion of British Caledonian suffered a temporary setback during the recession following in the wake of the 1973 oil crisis. This undermined its financial stability during its formative years and threatened its survival at that stage.

Following economic revival during that decade's second half, British Caledonian regained its financial stability, enabling it to expand again and to become profitable.

== Inception ==
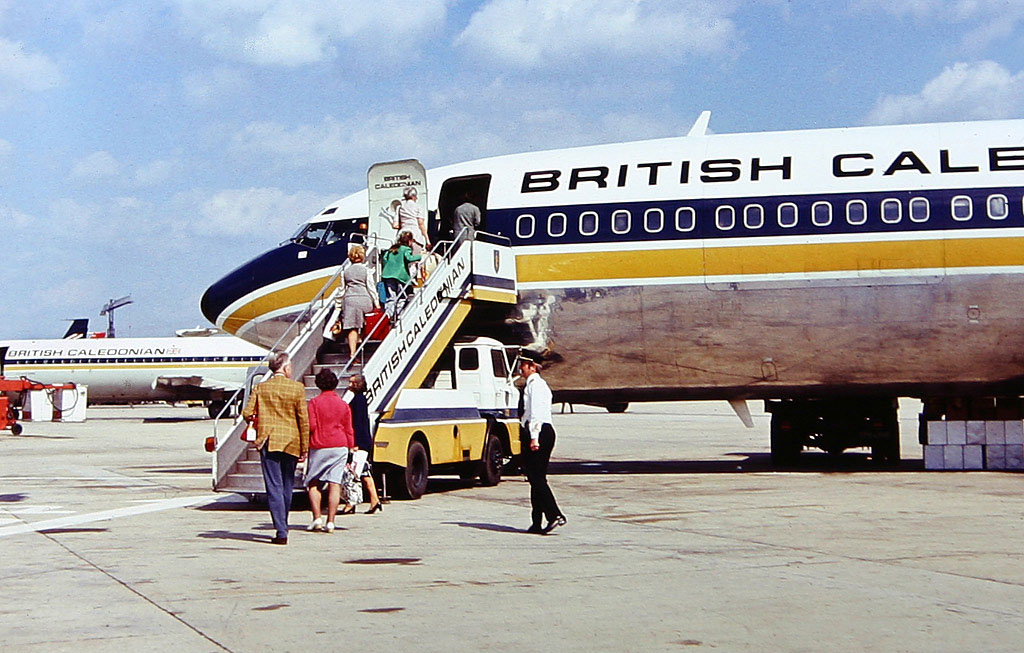
British Caledonian Boeing 707-320C at Gatwick Airport June 1975.

On St. Andrew's Day (30 November) in 1970, Caledonian Airways acquired British United Airways (BUA) from British and Commonwealth (B&C) for £6.9 million. Caledonian Airways also purchased three new BAC One-Eleven 500 aircraft, which B&C had leased to BUA, for a further £5 million.

Caledonian's acquisition of BUA from B&C did not include the assets of British United Island Airways (BUIA), BUA's regional affiliate.

BCal was a wholly owned subsidiary of Caledonian Airways Ltd. (Note: the new name of Airways Interests (Thomson)) BCal itself had a number of subsidiaries as well. Amongst these were Caledonian Airways Equipment Holdings and Caledonian Airways (Leasing), which were set up to acquire and dispose of aircraft on behalf of the airline as well as to sell maintenance, training and management expertise to third parties. BCal also owned two package holiday companies (Note: Blue Sky Holidays and Golden Lion Tours) as well as several hotels in Spain and Sierra Leone. BCal also inherited BUA's minority stakes in Gambia Airways, Sierra Leone Airways and Uganda Aviation Services.

The airline's formation followed publication of the Edwards report entitled British Air Transport in the Seventies in 1969. and a subsequent White paper from the government The report recommended the creation of a "Second Force", private sector carrier to take on the state-owned corporations — British European Airways (BEA) and British Overseas Airways Corporation (BOAC) — by providing competing domestic and international scheduled services on trunk routes. The government rejected the proposed transfer of routes from BOAC and BEA to the Second Force, and held that dual designation on a route should be open to any British independent. The new airline established its headquarters and operational base at Gatwick Airport and Sir Adam Thomson, one of the five co-founders as well as one of the main shareholders of Caledonian Airways, became its chairman and managing director.

BCal was a full member of the International Air Transport Association (IATA) at its inception as a result of inheriting BUA's membership. This included membership of IATA's trade association as well as participation in tariff co-ordination with other member airlines in the organisation's annual traffic conferences. BCal also had its own air freight terminal at Heathrow (Note: It operated two weekly all-cargo flights from there until the early 1980s.)

BCal inherited from its predecessors 31 jet aircraft: 11 long-haul aircraft (seven ex-Caledonian Boeing 707s and four ex-BUA Vickers VC10) and 20 short-haul planes (eight ex-BUA and four ex-Caledonian BAC One-Eleven 500s and eight ex-BUA BAC One-Eleven 200s). The issued share capital was £12 million – more than that of any other wholly private, British independent airline at the time – and its workforce numbered 4,400. (Note: including 450 flightdeck and 800 cabin crew, 1,000 maintenance personnel and 700 ramp workers)

This made BCal the UK's foremost independent airline of the time. Although Dan-Air and Britannia Airways exceeded BCal's total annual passenger numbers from 1975, BCal maintained its position as Britain's leading independent international scheduled airline, in terms of both the number of scheduled passengers carried each year and the total yearly scheduled capacity measured in passenger kilometres, (Note: the distance covered by its scheduled operation multiplied by the number of scheduled passengers carried within a 12-month period) throughout its 17-year existence.) The newly created company's output measured in available capacity tonne kilometres (Note: a figure arrived at by multiplying the number of [metric] tonnes available for the carriage of revenue load (passengers, cargo and mail) on each flight sector by the sector's distance in kilometres) was greater than that of some of the smaller, contemporary European flag carriers, such as Aer Lingus, Air India, Sabena, or Swissair. By that measure, BCal was about the same size as Australia's flag carrier Qantas.

The institutional investors that had helped Sir Adam Thomson and John de la Haye launch Caledonian Airways back in 1961 were also among the shareholders of the newly constituted airline. They included The Automobile Association (AA), Great Universal Stores (GUS), Hogarth Shipping, Lyle Shipping, Industrial and Commercial Finance Corporation (ICFC) – one of the two predecessors of Investors in Industry, (Note: 3i's former name) Kleinwort Benson, the Royal Bank of Scotland (RBS) and Schroders. (Airways Interests (Thomson), which had been set up at Caledonian's inception a decade earlier as an investment vehicle for that airline's founders to enable them to maintain control, was renamed Caledonian Airways Ltd and became the new group holding company.)

Before adopting the British Caledonian name, the new airline legally constituted two separate entities – Caledonian Airways (Prestwick) Ltd and British United Airways Ltd. These traded together under the interim name Caledonian//BUA until September 1971. The combined airline carried a total of 2.6 million passengers during its first year of operation.

For accounting purposes, BCal's aircraft were respectively allocated to a "BUA Division" and "Caledonian Division" during the interim period. The former was responsible for all IATA activities. This encompassed all scheduled services. The latter was responsible for all non-IATA work. This included all non-scheduled operations. At that time, two-thirds of all passengers were carried on charter flights. (Note: accounting for 60% of revenues)

During that period, former BUA air hostesses still wearing that airline's blue uniforms were working alongside their tartan-clad, former Caledonian counterparts in the cabins of all passenger flights. Eventually, the Caledonian tartan uniforms became BCal's standard for female staff.

Following the interim period, Caledonian Airways (Prestwick) Ltd and British United Airways Ltd were merged into British Caledonian Airways Ltd (BCal). All former BUA aircraft were repainted adopting Caledonian's livery featuring a prominent Scottish Lion Rampant on its aircraft's fins. At that time, all aircraft were named after famous Scots and well-known Scottish places. This tradition was continued throughout the airline's 17-year existence. Some BCal aircraft were also allocated out-of-sequence registrations. (For instance, G-BCAL was allocated to one of the Boeing 707s, G-CLAN and G-SCOT were the registrations of the Piper Navajo Chieftains, G-DCIO was the registration of the eighth DC-10 and G-HUGE was the Boeing 747 Combi registration)

The "Second Force" inherited BUA's extensive network of scheduled routes serving the British Isles, Continental Europe, Africa and South America. Its scheduled ambitions were aided by the British Government transferring to it BOAC's West African trunk routes to Nigeria and Ghana as well as the corporation's North African route to Libya. These routes represented only 3% of BOAC's annual, worldwide turnover.

The Government also agreed to let it serve Casablanca in Morocco from Gatwick in competition with BEA's service from Heathrow. Furthermore, the Government agreed to license BCal to operate non-stop scheduled services between London and Paris and to begin negotiations with the French authorities to secure reciprocal approval for BCal to be able to commence scheduled operations on what was then the busiest international air route in Europe. BCal moreover received Government assurances that it would be designated as the UK's sole flag carrier on all routes transferred to it and that it would be assisted in obtaining traffic rights for additional, selected scheduled routes where it wished to compete with the corporations, including the lucrative London—New York and London—Los Angeles routes.

Another important concession by the Government designed to improve the competitiveness of the "Second Force" was to permit it to provide a first class cabin on its East African routes. (BUA, from whom BCal inherited these routes, had been prevented from offering a first class on its East African routes. To compensate for this loss of competitiveness, Sir Freddie Laker, BUA's managing director from 1960 to 1965, had come up with the idea of designing a cargo door to be installed on the left-hand side of the forward fuselage of that airline's long-haul VC10s, where the first class cabin was normally located. This modification permitted the carriage of additional freight instead of first class passengers on the East African routes.)

In addition, BCal became the Government's "chosen instrument of the private sector". This meant that the Government agreed to accord preferential status to BCal's worldwide scheduled ambitions, especially in the award of additional licences to operate scheduled services on major domestic and international trunk routes. The Government hoped that putting BCal's requirements ahead of other UK-based independent airlines' rival scheduled ambitions would help the new "Second Force" develop into a fully fledged, major international scheduled airline, thereby enabling it to achieve the critical mass to challenge the corporations' near-monopoly among UK-based scheduled airlines.

The Central London air terminal at Victoria Station in London's West End, which the "Second Force" inherited from BUA as well, allowed passengers to complete all check-in formalities, including dropping off their hold luggage, before boarding their train to the airport.

BCal also had a Gatwick airside lounge for its premium passengers, which it named Clansmen Lounge.

== Formative years ==
BCal commenced scheduled operations from Gatwick to Nigeria (Lagos and Kano) and Ghana (Accra) in April 1971. Scheduled services from Gatwick to Tripoli began in July 1971. On each of these routes BCal replaced BOAC as the designated UK flag carrier. On 1 November 1971, BCal started scheduled flights between London Gatwick and Paris Le Bourget Airport, where it replaced BEA's London Heathrow—Paris Le Bourget service and competed with that airline's Heathrow—Paris Orly Airport service. This was the first time since the 1930s that an independent airline commenced a scheduled service on that trunk route.

BCal ended its 1970/71 financial year to 30 September 1971 with a profit of £1.7 million (after accounting for BUA's £600,000 loss)

In 1972, BCal extended its East African network to the Seychelles. The same year it also introduced a new Edinburgh—Newcastle—Copenhagen regional scheduled service to live up to its claim of being "Scotland's international airline". This complemented the Glasgow—Newcastle—Amsterdam regional route BCal had inherited from BUA.

1972 was also the year BCal introduced the UK's first-ever "no frills" type service on the two main domestic trunk routes linking London and Scotland. The airline introduced simultaneous night-time departures from Gatwick, Glasgow and Edinburgh, resulting in an overall frequency increase to six daily round-trips on each route. The company charged a very low £5 one-way fare on these night-time services, which were marketed under the Moonjet trademark. This move, which was modelled on the high-frequency-low-fares operation run by Pacific Southwest Airlines (PSA), the original "no frills" airline, along the busy San Diego—Los Angeles—San Francisco air corridor in California, boosted passenger numbers and profitability on both routes.

During that year, larger capacity, longer range and more fuel-efficient Boeing 707s replaced VC10s on BCal's South American routes, where the 707's greater range enabled the airline to run non-stop flights between London Gatwick and Rio de Janeiro, as well as on the West African trunk routes to Nigeria and Ghana.

As a result of the then prevailing, ruinous rates in the charter market, which still accounted for half of BCal's business, the airline incurred a loss of £194,000 during the financial year to 30 September 1972.

To support its ambitious expansion plans, BCal acquired a number of additional, second-hand Boeing 707s from various sources through its aircraft trading and leasing subsidiaries during the early 1970s. These included a pair of 320C series aircraft procured on a long-term lease from Britannia Airways featuring a two-class, "widebody look" interior. Another three 707s received re-modelled "widebody" cabins. All five were used to inaugurate the airline's transatlantic scheduled routes to New York and Los Angeles where the established competition was operating widebodied aircraft, such as the Boeing 747 "jumbo jet". It was thought that the aircraft's widebody style interiors would leave passengers with the impression that BCal was operating widebodied aircraft when in fact it was not. During that time, BCal placed an order with the British Aircraft Corporation (BAC) for two new One-Eleven 500s and acquired additional second-hand examples. At the same time, the airline disposed of some of its 707s, VC10s and One-Eleven 200s. These included the original pair of 399C series 707 aircraft that had been delivered to Caledonian Airways direct from the manufacturer in 1967/68.

BCal inaugurated its two transatlantic flagship services from London Gatwick to John F. Kennedy Airport (JFK) on 1 April 1973, followed by Gatwick — Los Angeles International a few days later. Earl Mountbatten of Burma was BCal's chief guest on board its inaugural Gatwick—JFK flight. (The flight diverted to Boston due to inclement weather in the New York area.) This occasion marked the first time that a British independent airline commenced non-stop transatlantic scheduled services on routes linking the UK and the US. Also on 1 April 1973, BCal replaced the two-letter CA airline designator – which was originally used to prefix all Caledonian Airways flight numbers and continued to prefix flight numbers allocated to transatlantic charter flights until 31 March 1973 – with the BR airline designator it had inherited from BUA at the time of its formation. This resulted in exclusive use of the BR designator as a prefix for all BCal flight numbers.

In 1973, BCal also inaugurated its fourth scheduled domestic trunk route between London Gatwick and Manchester. The new service was contracted to British Island Airways (BIA), BUIA's successor, which operated two daily return trips using its Handley Page Dart Herald turboprops.

On 20 March 1974, BCal switched its Gatwick—Paris services to the then brand-new Charles de Gaulle Airport in the northern Paris suburb of Roissy-en-France, thus becoming the first scheduled carrier to operate between London and the new Paris airport.

To further extend the network's reach and improve its connectivity, BCal agreed to host Dan-Air's new, twice daily Gatwick—Newcastle flights, which began on 20 April 1974, in its computer reservation system (CRS) as part of a combined marketing effort.

June 1974 saw the launch of BCal's non-stop Gatwick—Brussels scheduled route, the third European trunk route (Note: in addition to Gatwick—Amsterdam (inherited from BUA) and Gatwick—Paris) on which the airline operated scheduled services in competition with the incumbent flag carriers' established services from Heathrow.

== 1974 crisis year ==
The creation of British Airways (BA) as a result of the 1974 BEA-BOAC merger came against the background of the first global oil crisis in the wake of the 1973 Arab-Israeli War, which led to the quadrupling of the price of a barrel of oil as a consequence of the decision by the Organization of Petroleum Exporting Countries (OPEC) to boycott the West in retaliation for its support of Israel during that war. This meant that the newly merged corporation's original revenue and profit projections were far too optimistic. During that time, BA began exerting pressure on the Government, at the time its sole owner as well as the regulator for all UK airlines, to curtail the activities of its independent competitors generally and of the "Second Force" in particular.

The difficult operating environment at the time did not affect BA alone. In fact, the major scheduled airlines were all losing enormous amounts of money at the time. The sudden spike in the oil price caused a major recession during the second half of 1974 as well as the first half of 1975, with much reduced demand for air travel. This in turn led to the collapse of a number of prominent travel companies and their associated airlines – most notably the Court Line group and Horizon Holidays, the latter having provided work for three BCal short-haul aircraft prior to its collapse. There was also massive overcapacity on the North Atlantic routes.

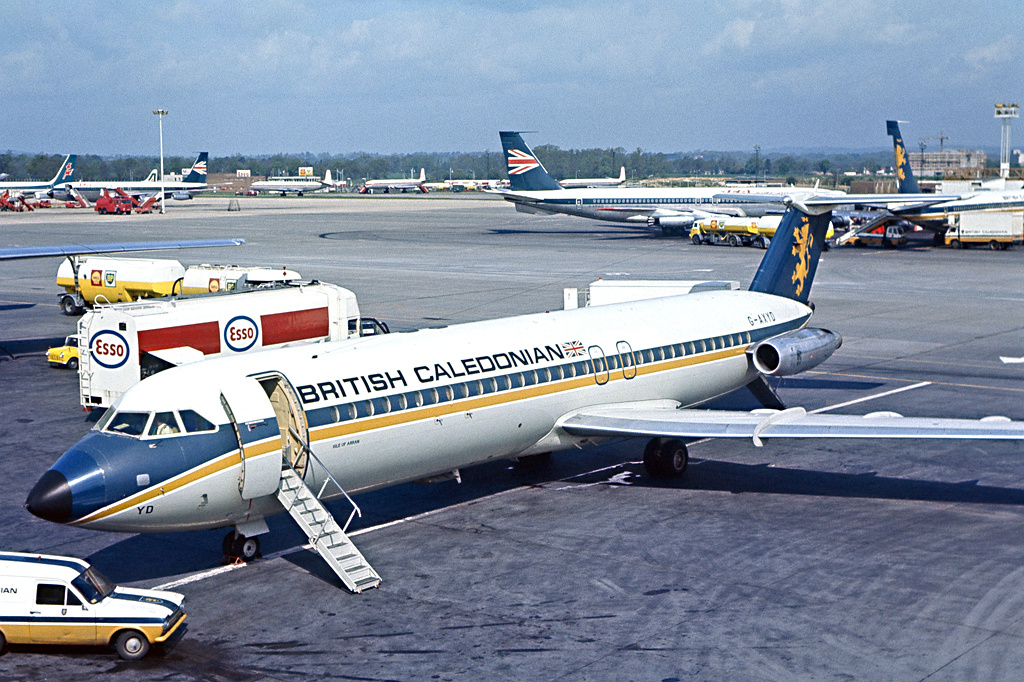
British Caledonian BAC 111-509EW at Gatwick

These circumstances forced BCal to put in place a major programme of retrenchment, known internally as Plan "S" (from "survival") Plan "S" began to be implemented from 1 November 1974. It resulted in route cut-backs – including the suspension of the transatlantic "flagship" services, of which Flight International said the fuel crisis was a "heaven-sent excuse" to back out of a failure. the immediate withdrawal and subsequent disposal of the remaining VC10 long-haul aircraft, the grounding of a number of short-haul aircraft as well 827 redundancies out of the company's 5,673 staff. It also resulted in organisational changes that saw Adam Thomson become the airline's chief executive in addition to continuing in his role as chairman of a reconstituted board, and the transfer of all aircraft leasing, purchase and sale activities to a new subsidiary. British Caledonian Aircraft Trading was the name of the company that succeeded Caledonian Airways Equipment Holdings, Caledonian Airways (Leasing) and other related interests. It became one of the most profitable parts of the business.

In addition to withdrawing from the prestigious long-haul routes to New York and Los Angeles after only 18 months, other specific measures the airline took at the time to ensure its survival included dropping all scheduled flights to Belfast, Copenhagen, Gibraltar, Ibiza, Málaga, Palma de Mallorca and Tunis, indefinitely suspending scheduled services on the Glasgow—Southampton route as well as cutting the number of frequencies on the Gatwick—Glasgow and Gatwick—Edinburgh routes from six to four daily round trips. Two surplus aircraft were leased out to Air Malta and Austrian Airlines respectively for the duration of the 1975 summer timetable period. Another aircraft was stationed at West Berlin's Tegel Airport during the month of July of that year to fulfill a short-term charter contract to carry Turkish migrant workers to and from Istanbul on behalf of a local tour operator. BCal also decided to increase its 707 freighter fleet from one to four aircraft and to acquire a five-seater Piper Aztec to serve the rapidly growing executive charter market. These changes left BCal with 25 operational aircraft for the 1975 summer season. To reduce operating costs further, the airline decided to contract out its scheduled operations between Gatwick and Le Touquet to BIA. (Note: a similar arrangement was introduced between Gatwick and Rotterdam during the 1976–77 winter timetable period) The reason for replacing BCal's One-Eleven 200 jet aircraft on this route with that airline's Herald turboprops at the beginning of the 1975 summer timetable period was the high price of jet fuel, which had made BCal's own jet aircraft operations uneconomic.

Even during this period of severe retrenchment, BCal continued launching scheduled services to new destinations. Dakar joined the airline's network on 1 November 1974, followed by Kinshasa on 1 April 1975.

As a result of the "success" of Plan "S", BCal's fortunes quickly recovered. The airline operation itself made a small profit of £250,000 during the financial year ended 30 September 1975 (Note: BCal's operating profit for the 1974/75 financial reporting period translated into an overall loss of £366,000, after taking into account the heavy costs relating to the early disposal of the remaining VC10s and the grounding of several other aircraft as well as the voluntary redundancy programme to achieve the required reduction in headcount) after having lost £4.3 million the year before.

== Spheres of influence ==
The then Trade Secretary Peter Shore conducted a review of the Government's aviation policy and in 1976 announced a new "spheres of influence" policy that ended dual designation for British airlines on all long-haul routes. It was no longer believed that competition was increasing the UK market share of the traffic. As a result, BA and BCal were no longer permitted to run competing scheduled services on long-haul routes, and BCal had to withdraw from the East African routes inherited from BUA as well as from the London—New York and London—Los Angeles routes. BCal lost its licences to New York, Los Angeles, Boston and Toronto – routes it had stopped running in 1974. It gained Lusaka (Zambia) In return, BCal became the sole British flag carrier to the entire South American mainland by taking over the former BA routes to Colombia, Peru and Venezuela. The net losses of revenues was about equal for the two airlines.

The Government's new "spheres of influence" aviation policy confined BCal's long-haul scheduled operations to two continents – Africa and South America. The loss of BCal's East African routes enabled the airline to replace the one-stop scheduled service via Nairobi to Lusaka with non-stop flights.

During 1976, BCal's recovery continued, leading to the introduction of a new scheduled route to Algiers and the reinstatement of scheduled services to Tunis. It also led to BCal's decision to replace the two daily Gatwick—Manchester round-trips BIA had operated with turboprops with a BCal One-Eleven service from the start of the 1976–77 winter timetable period. This equipment change was accompanied by the addition of a third daily frequency. (Note: the new mid-day service was initially operated by BIA Heralds under contract to BCal; BCal took over the operation of this service on 1 January 1977, giving a three-times-daily One-Eleven schedule)

BCal ended its 1975/76 financial year with a healthy profit of £5.6 million.

== Bermuda II treaty ==
In July 1976, Edmund Dell, the then new Secretary of State for Trade, renounced the original Bermuda air services agreement of 1946 and initiated bilateral negotiations with his US counterparts on a new air services agreement, which resulted in the Bermuda II Agreement of 1977. This presented BCal with new transatlantic opportunities to begin scheduled services to additional gateway cities in the US.

Under the new agreement, BCal had its licences to commence scheduled services from its Gatwick base to both Houston and Atlanta confirmed and was designated as the UK's exclusive flag carrier on both routes. It also obtained a licence and sole UK flag carrier status to commence scheduled services from Gatwick to Dallas–Fort Worth. In addition, BCal obtained a licence and sole UK flag carrier status to commence scheduled all cargo flights between Gatwick and Houston – including an optional stop at Manchester or Prestwick in either direction.

During the Bermuda II negotiations, the UK side succeeded in having inserted into the new air services agreement a clause stating that Gatwick – rather than Heathrow – was to be nominated as the designated US flag carrier's London gateway airport whenever BCal was going to be the sole designated UK flag carrier on the same route. This clause was meant to support the growth of BCal's scheduled operation at Gatwick as well as to redress the competitive imbalance between it and its much bigger, more powerful rivals.

The UK side furthermore succeeded in negotiating a three-year exclusivity period for the incumbent operator on any new route with their US counterparts.

For Gatwick-based BCal this meant that it did not have to face any competitor that was using Heathrow, a more accessible airport with a bigger catchment area and a far greater number of passengers connecting between flights, on any of the new routes it was planning to launch to the US. It also meant that it had any new route to the US completely to itself for the first three years of operation, which most airline industry analysts reckon is sufficiently long for a brand-new scheduled air service to become profitable.

At British insistence, Bermuda II furthermore contained clauses that made it illegal for any airline operating scheduled flights between the UK and the US to resort to predatory pricing or capacity dumping. Air fares were only approved if they reflected the actual cost of providing these services. Similarly, capacity increases were sanctioned on a reciprocal basis only. The reason for insisting on the inclusion of these provisions in the Bermuda II agreement was to prevent the much bigger, better financed and commercially far more aggressive US carriers from undercutting BCal with loss-leading fares cross-subsidised with profits those carriers' vast domestic networks generated, as well as to stop them from marginalising the UK carrier by adding capacity far in excess of what the market could sustain.

Both sides also agreed to continue dual designation (Note: designating two UK flag carriers as well as two US flag carriers) on the London—New York and London—Los Angeles routes. The principle of dual designation was to be extended to another two high-volume routes.

BCal resumed scheduled transatlantic services on 24 October 1977. The airline became the first UK carrier to launch a daily, non-stop London (Gatwick)—Houston scheduled service as well as a weekly, direct all-cargo service on the same route, which operated via Prestwick on the outbound leg and via Manchester on the return leg. BCal inaugurated the daily scheduled passenger flights with a Boeing 707-320C narrow-bodied aircraft. In April 1978, BCal re-configured the 707s plying this route in a three-class layout, which featured a dedicated Executive cabin, in addition to a first and an economy class section. This was the first time since the beginning of the jet age that a scheduled airline had offered a "third" class specifically aimed at the business traveller. It was intended to replace the 707s operating the all-passenger services with a brand-new, larger capacity as well as more fuel-efficient DC-10 widebodied aircraft at the start of the 1978/79 winter timetable period.

== Beginning of the widebody era ==
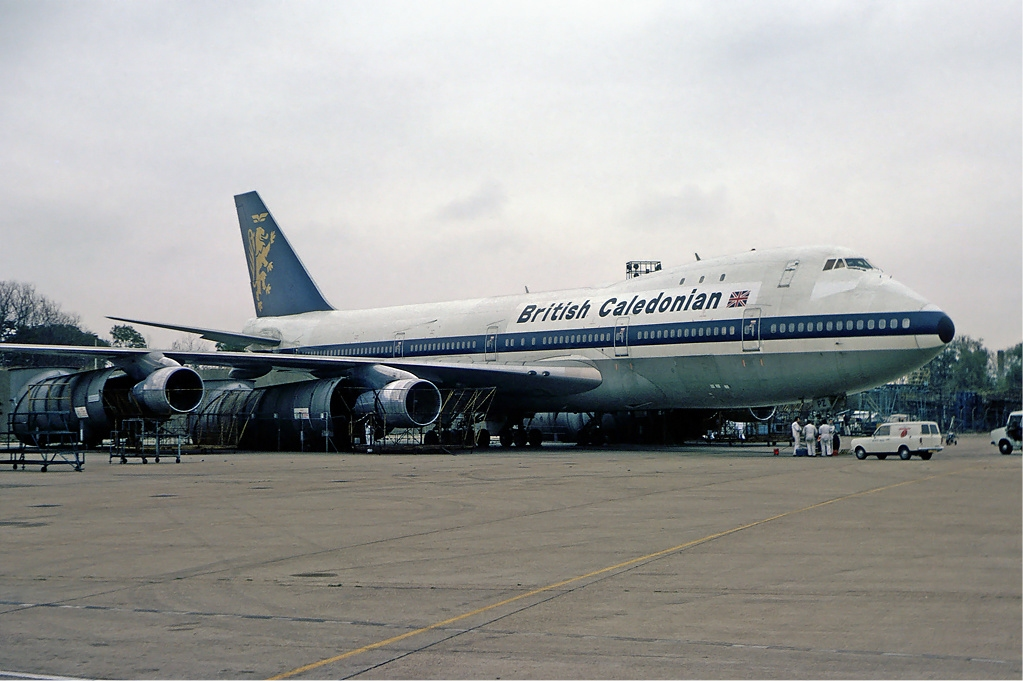
The first Boeing 747 to wear BCal colours being prepared for an engine run prior to delivery to BCal.

Following an exhaustive, three-week evaluation of the Boeing 747, the McDonnell Douglas DC-10 and the Lockheed L-1011 Tristar during the early summer of 1976, BCal chose the DC-10 as the wide-bodied aircraft best suited to serve its expanding long-haul route network. The immediate availability of the aircraft was important so there was no British-engine option, the 747 too large and the Tristar could not be delivered in time. On 3 June 1976, the airline placed a US$70 million order for two long-range series 30 aircraft with an option on another two. To ensure an early delivery, the company took over a delivery slot for two aircraft that had originally been booked by China Airlines.

On 13 March 1977, the first of the two DC-10s ordered arrived at the airline's Gatwick base from Prestwick at the end of a delivery flight from the manufacturer's plant in Long Beach, California.

The aircraft, which was configured in a 265-seat, two-class layout, entered commercial service on BCal's busy West African trunk routes to Nigeria and Ghana later the same month, replacing the airline's Boeing 707s on six of the seven weekly services on these routes.

The second aircraft, which arrived at Gatwick in early May of that year, was initially configured in a 295-seat, single-class layout. It entered service later that month on BCal's Advance Booking Charter (ABC) routes to the US and Canada. The aircraft was re-configured in the airline's contemporary, 265-seat, two-class scheduled layout at the end of the summer period. It replaced Boeing 707s on two of BCal's three weekly South Atlantic schedules to Brazil, Argentina and Chile, as well as on one of the company's two weekly mid-Atlantic schedules to Venezuela, Colombia and Peru from the beginning of the 1977/78 winter timetable period.

The DC-10's superior operating economics compared with the 707 enabled BCal to operate the aircraft non-stop from Buenos Aires to Gatwick with a viable payload.

Although the introduction of the DC-10 resulted in a huge increase in BCal's long-haul passenger and cargo capacity, the actual loads exceeded the airline's forecasts and helped it grow its traffic volumes on its scheduled services to West Africa and South America.

BCal was so pleased with the DC-10's performance that it decided to convert both of the options it had taken when placing the original order for two aircraft during 1976 into firm orders for delivery in autumn 1978 and spring 1979 respectively. However, a subsequent strike at the manufacturer's plant meant that McDonnell Douglas could not honour its delivery schedules. This necessitated the temporary lease of a Boeing 747-100 from Aer Lingus, and the use of BA flightdeck crews to operate the aircraft. The aircraft, which wore a slightly modified BCal livery, was operating the Gatwick—Houston schedule during the 1978/79 winter timetable period to cover for the late delivery of the airline's third DC-10.

== Attaining success ==
By 1978, BCal had fully recovered from the 1974 crisis year, which had threatened its very existence at that time. After the severe contraction forced upon it by the early 1970s' oil crisis, the company's core scheduled operation was growing again with new widebodied aircraft and routes being added and schedules being expanded. Business was booming with planes being fuller than at any time in the firm's history. The airline recorded a pre-tax profit of £12.2 million during its 1977/78 financial year to 31 October 1978. This translated into a £10 million retained profit. It was the company's best financial result since its formation back in November 1970. BCal's senior management decided to allocate £644,000 of the retained profit to a new profit-share scheme to reward its staff for their hard work, and as an incentive for the future. BCal's profit-share scheme, which began the following year, was one of the first of its kind in the UK airline industry.

BCal also became a "scheduled service only" airline during 1978, implementing a decision taken the year before when the share of passengers travelling on charter flights had declined to just 15% of all passengers carried. There were two reasons for BCal's withdrawal from the charter market:

- A 25% contraction of the transatlantic ABC flights market as a result of the initial success of the daily Laker Airways Skytrain low-fares, "no frills" scheduled operation between London Gatwick and New York JFK, which had begun in the previous year's autumn season.
- A steady decline in charter rates in the European package tour holiday market where BCal used to supply whole-plane charter seats to its Blue Sky Holidays tour operator affiliate as well as third party tour companies.

1978 was also the first year BCal operated the majority of its scheduled services plying the prime long-haul routes to West Africa and South America with widebody equipment.

At the start of that year's summer timetable period, flight frequencies on BCal's Gatwick—Glasgow and Gatwick—Amsterdam routes increased to five round-trips per day on week days. During that period, the airline also resumed its Edinburgh—Newcastle—Copenhagen service, which it had abandoned in 1974.

During 1978, Abidjan and Birmingham joined BCal's scheduled route network. At the start of the 1978/79 winter timetable period, Benghazi joined the network. At that time, the airline also increased frequencies between London Gatwick and Paris Charles de Gaulle to seven daily round-trips on week days, with flights operating at two-hourly intervals. The addition of twice-weekly flights to the Libyan port city of Benghazi to the existing five weekly services to Tripoli meant that for the first time BCal was able to offer its passengers daily flights to Libya, an important market for profitable, oil-related business travel. BCal's introduction of a 747 on the daily Gatwick—Houston schedule furthermore enabled it to replace its two-class configured One-Eleven 500s on the West African coastal schedule to Banjul (The Gambia) and Freetown (Sierra Leone) via Casablanca and Las Palmas with 707s. The 707's greater range enabled it to cut out intermediate stops and offer its passengers a more convenient, direct routeing that took less time. BCal replaced two-class One-Elevens operating on the Tripoli route with 707s.

In early 1978, BCal introduced an updated livery.

1978 was furthermore the year Adam Thomson held the chairmanship of the Association of European Airlines (AEA). (Note: 1977 to 1978)

In addition, the British Airports Authority had just completed the first phase of a major refurbishment and extension of BCal's Gatwick base. The centrepiece of this revamp was a completely refurbished centre pier featuring 11 telescopic, widebody-compatible loading bridges. These were the first loading bridges to be installed at Gatwick, which was a single-terminal airport at the time. For the first time in its history, BCal also gained a dedicated check-in area for all its flights.

The year before, the Government had announced its intention to take pro-active steps to help ensure Gatwick's development as a genuine alternative to Heathrow. It was hoped that this in turn would assist BCal's development as a serious alternative to BA and the other major, established scheduled airlines. These steps included inviting BCal and Britain's other independent airlines to apply to the CAA for route licences to operate scheduled services to destinations in the British Isles and in Continental Europe that were not already served from Gatwick, thereby increasing the reach of the airport's scheduled route network as well as providing more connecting traffic for BCal.

BCal was keen to expand its limited short-haul European network beyond the existing four routes linking London Gatwick with Paris Charles de Gaulle, Amsterdam Schiphol, Brussels National and Genoa. The airline needed to develop its connecting traffic at Gatwick by growing the European network to include destinations in Germany, Switzerland, Scandinavia and southern Europe to help it increase load factors on its long-haul flights to Africa, South America and the US as well as to improve the profitability of these services. The airline had planned to commence new short-haul scheduled services from Gatwick to Copenhagen, Gothenburg, Oslo and Stockholm during summer 1978, using the licences the CAA had awarded it the year before. However, BCal was unable to use its newly awarded licences as there was no provision in the bilateral air services agreements the UK had concluded with Denmark, Norway and Sweden for another carrier to operate scheduled services on the main trunk routes between London and these countries. (Note: in addition to the incumbent flag carriers' services) This meant that BA and Scandinavian Airlines (SAS) had an effective monopoly on most routes between the UK and Scandinavia. The UK Government agreed to assist BCal in securing reciprocal traffic rights for the London—Scandinavia licences during its negotiations on a new bilateral air services agreement with its three Scandinavian counterparts in December 1978. It was hoped that this would enable BCal to commence its first-ever scheduled services from London to Scandinavia at the start of the 1979 summer timetable period.

Government initiatives in support of Gatwick's development also included new policies to transfer all scheduled services between London and Canada as well as London and the Iberian peninsula from Heathrow to Gatwick by 1 April 1979, banning whole-plane charters at Heathrow and to compel all airlines that were planning to operate a scheduled service to or from London for the first time to use Gatwick instead of Heathrow. The latter policy was officially known as the "London [Air] Traffic Distribution Rules". It came into effect on 1 April 1978 and was applied retroactively from the beginning of April 1977. These rules were designed to achieve a fairer distribution of traffic between London Heathrow and London Gatwick, the UK's two main international gateway airports. The policy was aimed at increasing Gatwick's utilisation to help the airport make a profit.

Another pro-active measure the Government took to aid BCal's and Gatwick's development at the time was to grant permission for Airlink, a high-frequency helicopter shuttle service linking both of London's main airports. The new helicopter shuttle service linking London Heathrow and London Gatwick was inaugurated on 9 June 1978.

This service was operating 10 times a day in each direction (Note: from 07.10 hrs to 20.10 hrs) using a 28-seater Sikorsky S-61N helicopter, (Note: subsequent re-configuration reduced seating to 24 to increase space for interline passengers' transfer baggage) which was owned by the BAA. BCal held the licence to operate the service, provided the cabin crew (Note: a single crew member used to look after the passengers on the 25-minute flight, which subsequently halved to 12 minutes as a result of reducing the separation with other air traffic along the route taken by the helicopter) and was in charge of reservations and ticketing. British Airways Helicopters, the wholly owned helicopter subsidiary of BA whose headquarters were located at Gatwick, provided the flightdeck crew and engineering support.

The service gave BCal's passengers easier access to flight connections at Heathrow, especially to destinations not served by scheduled flights from Gatwick at the time.

It was used by 60,000 passengers during the first year of its operation.

1978 was also the year BCal set up a task force headed by Gordon Davidson, BA's former Concorde director, to investigate the possibility of operating the Concorde supersonic airliner viably on the airline's long-haul route network as there were still two unsold, "white tail" examples available at that time.

Another important reason for BCal's decision to set up a Concorde task force was that the 1976 aviation policy review had exempted Concorde from the "spheres of influence" policy and therefore it was possible for BA to operate supersonic services to prime business and leisure destinations within BCal's sphere of influence, such as Lagos or Rio de Janeiro for example. To ward off this potential threat, BCal's senior management decided to develop its own Concorde plans, either independently or in partnership with BA.

The most obvious choice for a supersonic service was Gatwick—Lagos, the backbone and main money spinner of BCal's scheduled operation. BCal's Concorde task force's brief was to assess the viability of a second daily all-premium supersonic service complementing the airline's existing daily subsonic, mixed-class widebody service on this route.

BCal put in a bid to acquire one of the remaining two "white tail" aircraft. The bid was not successful.

However, BCal eventually arranged for two aircraft to be leased from BA and Aérospatiale respectively and to have them maintained by either BA or Air France. It became necessary to find additional work for BCal's envisaged two-strong Concorde fleet to increase the aircraft's utilisation, thus permitting a cost-effective operation. Therefore, BCal decided to use the second aircraft to launch a supersonic service between Gatwick and Atlanta, with a technical stop at either Gander or Halifax. It also considered using the aircraft to serve Houston and points on its South American network at a later stage.

Both supersonic services were to be launched at the start of the 1980 summer timetable period.

In 1979, the airline took delivery of its delayed third and fourth McDonnell Douglas DC-10-30 widebodied aircraft during the first and third quarter. This permitted the aircraft's introduction on its daily Gatwick—Houston schedule as well as the replacement of the remaining 707-operated services on its mid- and South Atlantic routes. The narrow-bodied capacity released was used to add frequencies on existing routes as well as to launch services to new medium- and long-haul destinations. As a result, BCal launched a fourth weekly service to Brazil. It also launched a new route to Oran and added Quito and Guayaquil to the mid-Atlantic schedule. The company furthermore increased frequencies on its short-haul routes. A fourth daily round-trip was added to both Gatwick—Manchester and Gatwick—Brussels. A third daily frequency operating on week days was added to the Newcastle—Amsterdam sector of BCal's Glasgow—Newcastle—Amsterdam regional route.

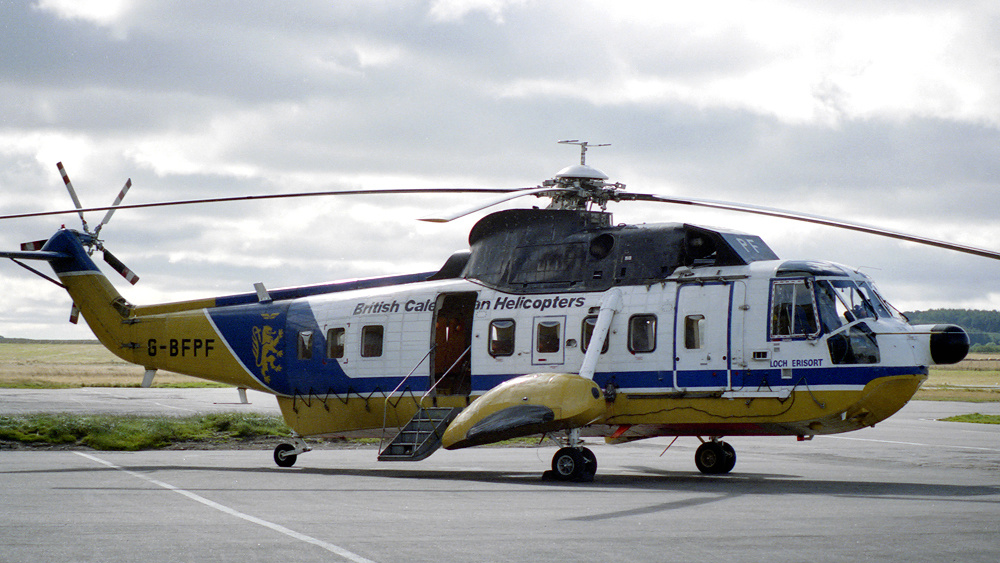
A British Caledonian Helicopters Sikorsky S-61N at Aberdeen Airport in May 1986.

During that year, BCal also established a wholly owned helicopter subsidiary and it placed the UK launch order for a brand-new widebodied aircraft, the Airbus A310.

This was also the time BCal came up with a proposal to create a new network of European low-fare services. These were to be marketed under the trademark Miniprix and were meant to counter Laker Airways's plans for a pan-European Skytrain operation. Excluding BCal's existing four European destinations, it envisaged linking Gatwick with 20 additional points on the Continent. These services were to be operated during off-peak times, initially using the airline's existing narrowbody aircraft. Only six of 22 licences applied for were granted but even those did not lead to routes as the Department of Trade would not start discussions with the European authorities, which they believed would be blocked due to the destination countries' domestic concerns. None of Laker's 36 applications were approved.

BCal was evaluating both the McDonnell Douglas MD-80 narrowbody as well as the Airbus A310 and Boeing 767 widebodies as suitable long-term replacements for its existing narrow-bodied aircraft on these routes.

BCal's setbacks during 1979 included continuing frustration of the airline's desire to launch scheduled services to Scandinavia despite the conclusion of a new Anglo-Scandinavian bilateral air services agreement and the temporary grounding of the airline's widebodied fleet — three McDonnell Douglas DC-10-30s — during the second quarter following the crash of American Airlines flight 191, a DC-10-10, in Chicago in May that year.

With their DC-10s grounded, BCal took a short-term lease of a 747 to provide adequate capacity on its Nigerian trunk routes during that period. BCal also operated a Dan-Air Comet on short-term lease between Gatwick and Tripoli while the 707s normally used on that service were redeployed to operate a reduced schedule to Houston and South America. In addition to these aircraft, a Boeing 707-120B was leased during that period as well to cover the shortfall in capacity.

== Notes and citations ==
Notes

Citations

== Bibliography ==
- Thomson, Adam (1990), High Risk: The Politics of the Air, London: Sidgwick and Jackson
