= The UK Holiday Group =

The UK Holiday Group Ltd.
- Type: Private company
- Industry: Travel and Tourism
- Founded: Norwich, Norfolk (1983)
- Founder: Paul Bennett
- Headquarters: The Old Bakery, Queens Road, Norwich, United Kingdom
- Number of locations: 9 hotels (2018)
- Area served: England; Wales
- Key people: Paul Bennett (Chairman), Neal Fletcher (Operations Director), Harold Burke (Sales Director),
- Products: Over 50's package holidays; Coastal Breaks
- Services: Package holidays; Elderly travel; Coastal holidays
- Number of employees: 400+ (2014)
- Subsidiaries: Grand UK Hotels; Sunrise Direct; Just For Groups; Grand UK Holidays; Glenton; Anglia Hosts
- Website: theukholidaygroup.com

The UK Holiday Group Ltd. or simply referred to as UKHG is a British privately owned package holiday company based in Norwich, United Kingdom specialising in holidays for elderly couples.

== History ==
The group was founded in 1983 by Paul Bennett when he was 23 with his £500 life savings.

The coaches subsidiary Glenton was launched in 2005 by Steve Turbill, Harriet Stamp and Paul Bennett.

In 2010, the year it purchased the Daunceys Hotel in Weston-Super-Mare, the group's sales rose 11% to £26 million with 100,000 annual visitors.

In November 2012, the group bought the bookings of the defunct Bowen Travel Group (coaches).

In March 2012, the group closed down the Warwick Hotel in Blackpool. In October 2014, the group announced its intention to demolish the Mount Sorrel Hotel in Barry, and build houses on the lot instead (the hotel was revived in 2016 when a new owner bought it). In 2018, the group sold two of its hotels: the Historic Lake District hotel in Kendal for £975k, and the historic Daunceys Hotel in Somerset for £995,000.

== Description ==
Each year, the hotel group welcomes more than 250,000 overnight guests.

=== Subsidiaries ===
- Grand UK Hotels: 6 hotels
- Grand UK Holidays: Cruises, coach tours, holidays by air and rail tours
- Sunrise Direct: Coach tours and cruises
- Glenton Holidays: Based in Glasgow, Scotland. Coach tours and cruises during Scottish holidays.
- Anglia Hosts: Standalone subsidiary that manages the Best Western George Hotel Swaffham, Norfolk, purchased in 2013

== Locations ==
The group operate 9 hotels throughout England and Wales. Eight are traded under Grand UK Hotels, one under Anglia Hosts

List of The UK Holiday Group's hotels
Name of Hotel	Location	No. of Bedrooms	Traded under
Glen Usk Hotel	Llandrindod Wells, Wales	79	Grand UK Hotels
Hotel Richmond	Torquay, Devon	48	Grand UK Hotels
Nelson Hotel	Great Yarmouth, Norfolk	50	Grand UK Hotels
County Hotel Skegness	Skegness, Lincolnshire	40	Grand UK Hotels
George Hotel	Swaffham, Norfolk	28	Anglia Hosts
