= JetXtra.com =

jetXtra.com
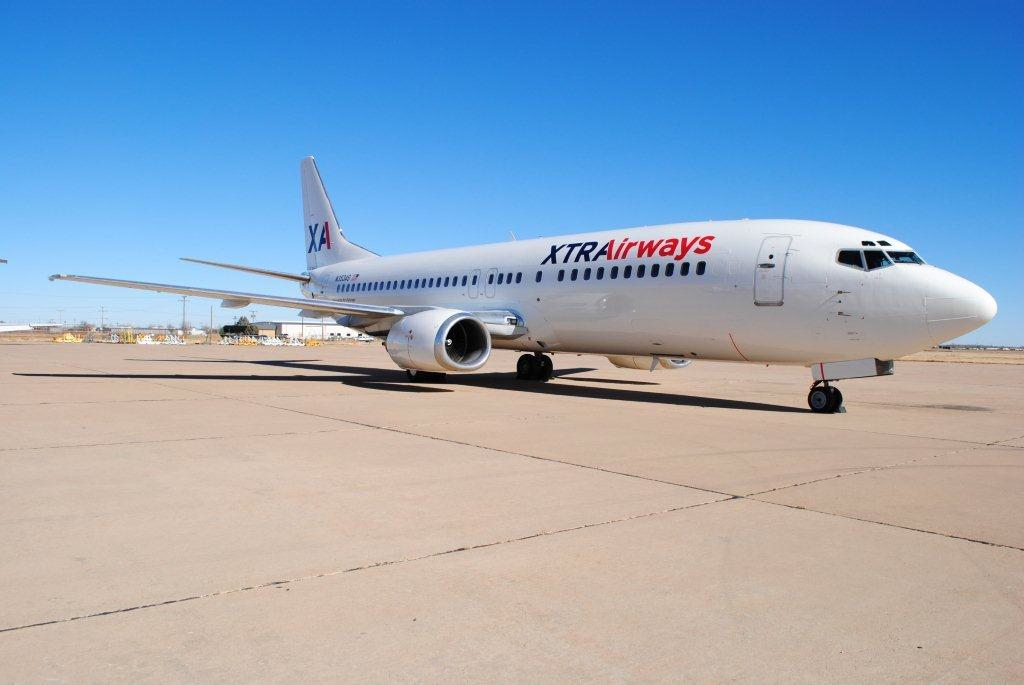
- Boeing 737-400
- Industry: Airline
- Genre: Tour operator
- Founded: 2012
- Defunct: 2017
- Fate: dissolved
- Headquarters: Liverpool, United Kingdom

JetXtra.com was a virtual airline that offered air charters between the United Kingdom and Spain using aircraft leased from other airlines. It operated from 2012 to 2017. In 2021 it was relaunched as an online package holiday supplier/ Tour operator.

== History ==
JetXtra was launched in 2012 from Liverpool. In January 2012, Jet2.com took issue over the use of the word 'jet' in the name.

In May 2013, flights commenced from Humberside Airport using a Volotea Boeing 717. For the summer season of 2014, JetXtra provided services between Alicante and Palma de Mallorca and Humberside using a BA CityFlyer Embraer E-Jet family aircraft operated by British Airways.

In 2021, the company was restarted as an online package holiday supplier as part of Sporting Events Global Ltd, ATOL 5772 ABTA L9491.
