= Air Travel Organisers' Licensing =

Air Travel Organisers' Licensing (ATOL, /ˈætɒl/) is a United Kingdom Civil Aviation Authority (CAA) scheme to give financial protection to people who have purchased package holidays and flights from a member tour operator.

== Corporate function ==
The majority of UK tour operators are required to hold an ATOL licence, without which they may not legally sell air travel. ATOL-licensed firms will have had their business practices inspected by the CAA. An ATOL licensed tour operator must also obtain insurance bonds from the CAA. The aim of this is to provide refunds to travellers affected by any event which causes the airline to be unable to provide travel for its customers, and to arrange for flights (in addition to accommodation and other items which may be included in a package holiday) to return home those already abroad at the time.

== History ==
In the 1960s, voluntary organisations such as the Association of British Travel Agents (ABTA) provided a degree of financial protection for air travellers. In 1970, the Federation of Tour Operators (FTO) (then the Tour Operators Study Group) introduced a bonding scheme whereby their members had to obtain bonds to the value of 5% of their annual turnover. In 1972, ABTA followed suit.

=== Legal requirement ===
The Civil Aviation Act 1971 established the CAA. Covered under this act was the creation of the original Civil Aviation (Air Travel Organisers' Licensing) Regulations 1972 (SI 1972/223). These mandated that all tour operators whose primary mode of transport was by air (but not airlines themselves), must hold an ATOL licence. These regulations came into effect in April 1973.

=== Early practice ===
On 15 August 1974, the Court Line group collapsed. It was the second largest tour operator at the time and its subsidiaries included Clarksons Holidays, Horizon, and Medvillas. Clarksons Holidays held an ATOL licence and was therefore theoretically covered by its insurance bond.

Although the 35,000 customers stranded abroad were successfully repatriated under the scheme, there were insufficient funds for the 100,000 people whose holidays had been paid for in advance. This was a blow to consumer confidence and led to considerable media attention. A government fund called the Air Travel Trust has since been introduced to pay for any excess which is not covered by ATOL.

=== Collapse of Thomas Cook ===
On 23 September 2019 Thomas Cook went into compulsory liquidation, sparking the largest peacetime repatriation in the UK's history. With Thomas Cook being ATOL-protected, the Civil Aviation Authority set about repatriating more than 150,000 British holidaymakers.

=== Official list of ATOL holder failures ===
On 15 July 2019 The CAA publish a public list of recently failed ATOL holders. Information on recent ATOL holder failures, including guidance on claims, is available for both travel companies and passengers. It provides advice, key documents, and contact details, outlining the steps to take if you are due to travel, currently abroad, or seeking to recover costs.

=== Official list of ATOL holders ===
The CAA publishes an open list of ATOL holders upon the addition, modification or removal of an ATOL License. Information on recent ATOL holder authorisations, authorised passenger numbers and the ATOL Holders contact details can be downloaded from this site for public consumption.
