= SS Pennington Court =

British cargo steamship

Coordinates: 58°18′N 27°55′W

History

United Kingdom
- Name: 1924: Rochdale; 1927: Pennington Court
- Namesake: 1924: Rochdale
- Owner: 1924: Charles Radcliffe & Co; 1927: United British SS Co; 1936: Court Line
- Operator: 1929: Haldin, Philipps Ltd
- Port of registry: 1924: Cardiff; 1927: London
- Builder: Richardson, Duck & Co
- Yard number: 687
- Launched: 3 June 1924
- Completed: July 1924
- Identification: UK official number 148274; code letters KRBG (until 1933); call sign GDZR (1934 onward)
- Fate: Sunk by torpedo, 9 October 1942

General characteristics
- Type: Cargo ship
- Tonnage: 6,098 GRT, 3,773 NRT
- Length: 400.0 ft (121.9 m)
- Beam: 53.0 ft (16.2 m)
- Draught: 25 ft 9 in (7.85 m)
- Depth: 32.7 ft (10.0 m)
- Decks: 1
- Installed power: 425 NHP
- Propulsion: triple-expansion engine
- Speed: 12 knots (22 km/h)
- Crew: 41 crew + 4 DEMS gunners
- Sensors & processing systems: by 1935: wireless direction finding
- Notes: sister ships: Amblestone, Conistone

SS Pennington Court was a British cargo steamship. She was launched in 1924 as Rochdale and renamed Pennington Court in 1927. In the Second World War she carried iron ore, grain and other supplies to Britain. She was sunk with all hands in the Battle of the Atlantic in 1942.

== Building ==
In 1924 Richardson, Duck and Company built three sister ships at its shipyard in Thornaby-on-Tees in Yorkshire for Charles Radcliffe Ltd of Cardiff. Amblestone was launched in 5 February and completed that March. Conistone was launched on 3 April and completed that May. Rochdale was launched on 3 June and completed that July.

Each of the three ships had a registered length of 400.0 ft (121.9 m), beam of 53.0 ft (16.2 m) and depth of 32.7 ft (10.0 m). Rochdale's tonnages were 6,098 GRT and 3,774 NRT.

For each of the three ships Blair & Co of Stockton-on-Tees built a three-cylinder triple-expansion engine that was rated at 425 NHP. Rochdale could achieve 12 knots (22 km/h).

Charles Radcliffe Ltd registered Rochdale in Cardiff. Her UK official number was 148724 and her code letters were KRBG.

== Haldin ownership ==
In 1927 Philip Haldin bought all three ships for his United British Steam Ship Company. Amblestone became Ovington Court, Conistone became Nollington Court and Rochdale became Pennington Court. Haldin registered the trio in London.

In 1934 the maritime call sign GDZR superseded Pennington Court's code letters. By 1935 she was equipped with wireless direction finding.

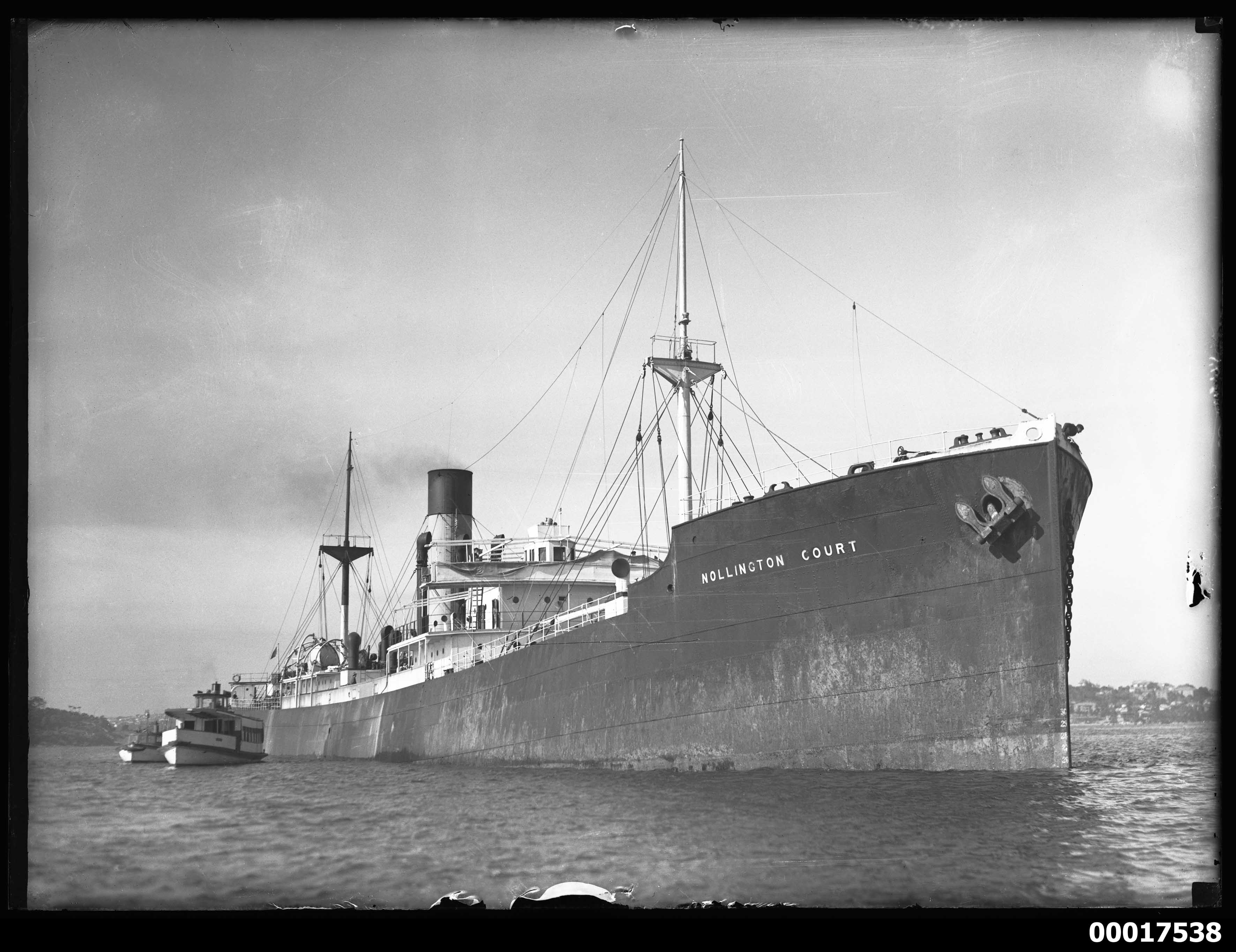
Pennington Court's sister ship Nollington Court in 1932. She sank in the Caribbean in 1937

In 1936 Haldin transferred ownership of the three ships to his Court Line company. In 1937 Nollington Court struck a submerged object in the Caribbean and sank. In 1940 Ovington Court dragged her anchors at Durban, ran aground and was lost.

== Second World War ==
In the Second World War Pennington Court's most frequent cargo was iron ore from various countries to Britain. Occasionally she brought grain from North America instead.

In October 1939 Pennington Court left Milford Haven in Wales carrying coal to Montevideo in Uruguay. By March 1940 she was back in home waters, leaving Orkney in Convoy ON 18/1 to Norway. She returned carrying iron ore in Convoy HN 24, which reached the Firth of Forth on 7 April.

In June 1940 Pennington Court was again carrying iron ore when she left Freetown. Where she loaded the ore is not recorded, but it may have been from Sierra Leone itself. she joined Convoy SL 36, which left Freetown on 15 June and reached Liverpool on 3 July.

On 26 July 1940 Pennington Court left the Firth of Forth for Freetown. She returned carrying iron ore with Convoy SL 46S, which left Freetown on 1 September and reached Liverpool on 13 or 23 September (records differ). She carried iron ore again with Convoy SL 56S, which left Freetown on 19 November and reached Liverpool on 12 December.

On 10 January 1941 Pennington Court left Liverpool for North America. In February she returned carrying grain in Convoy SC 22, which left Halifax, Nova Scotia on 8 February and reached Liverpool on 28 February. In May she left Liverpool for Montreal. There is then a gap in records of her movements until October 1941, when she was in Freetown again laden with iron ore.

Pennington Court may have had mechanical problems in Freetown. On 27 October she left with Convoy SL 91 bound for Liverpool, but turned back soon after leaving port. On 22 November she left Freetown with Convoy SL 93, but turned back again. On 30 November she left Freetown with Convoy SL 94, with which she succeeded in reaching Liverpool on 20 December.

On 4 February Pennington Court left Halifax, Nova Scotia carrying iron ore with Convoy SC 68, which reached Liverpool on 20 February. On 27 March she left Liverpool with Convoy ON 80, which reached Halifax on 15 April. She continued to Boston, where she arrived on 20 April. There is then a gap in records of her movements until September 1942, when she sailed from Saint John, New Brunswick to Halifax.

=== Loss ===
At Halifax Pennington Court joined Convoy SC 103, which had left New York on 26 September and was bound for Liverpool. She was carrying 8,494 tons of grain plus a deck cargo of trucks, and was bound for Belfast. Pennington Court was at the rear of one of the columns of the convoy, and about a week out of port she and another ship fell behind.

U-253 sighted and reported the stragglers. At 2101 hrs on 9 October U-254 fired a spread of three torpedoes, two of which hit Pennington Court. The ship remained slowly under way, so at 2145 hrs U-254 fired a fourth torpedo, but missed. At 2150 U-254 fired a fifth torpedo, but it passed straight under Pennington Court.

Pennington Court's wireless telegraph operator transmitted distress signals, and the crew abandoned ship. U-254's commander wanted to open fire with his 88 mm deck gun, but was prevented by a heavy sea. U-254's crew reloaded her torpedo tubes and fired a sixth torpedo at 2310 hrs, which caused Pennington Court to sink by her bow.

Pennington Court sank in mid-Atlantic, southeast of Greenland and southwest of Iceland. None of her lifeboats was ever found. All 45 members of her ship's company were lost.
