= Clarksons Travel Group =

UK tour operator

Clarksons Travel Group was a pioneering package tour operator in the UK during the 1960s and early 1970s. Its founder, in 1959 as Clarksons Tours, a subsidiary of the long-established City firm of H. Clarkson shipbrokers, was Tom Gullick, a former flag lieutenant in the Royal Navy.

The company was immensely successful but ran into financial difficulties and in 1972 was taken over by its major supplier of air travel, Court Line. However, after two years, on 15 August 1974, Court Line collapsed, taking down Clarksons with at least £7m owing to 100,000 holidaymakers and possibly twice as much.

== Services ==
The company was based appropriately in Sun Street, EC2 in the City of London. It specialised in short tours to European cities and wine regions, and low-cost package holidays which included accommodation, full or half-board and air transport by charter flight from the UK to the holiday destination.

Destinations included Spain, Portugal, Italy, Yugoslavia and Greece as well as Mediterranean cruises and a wide range of short tours to European cities and wine regions. A typical example was £50 with full-board in Palma, Majorca for 14 nights. Flights also were made to Tunisia and other destinations. In 1972 the company introduced package holidays to Court Line-owned hotels on the Caribbean island of St Lucia, using wide-bodied Court Line Lockheed L-1011 TriStar aircraft, the first to operate in Europe.

== Technology ==
Always a pioneer, Clarksons installed the very first real-time computer system in the Western Hemisphere, which handled bookings, flights, and hotels all in one. The system was a UNIVAC 96K 9400 card-reading real-time computer, with a complete terminal using a teletype-like data entry point with hexadecimal data entered by pressing numerous buttons illuminated on the main board. There were 6 magnetic tape machines, two magnetic disk drives (each 10 megabytes with six heavy metal disks for each machine), and a high-speed line printer (capable of printing charter airline tickets at a rate of about one every three seconds on multi-part paper). The basement computer room was maintained at 64 °F (18 °C) and 65% humidity, and operated 7 days per week, 52 weeks per year. There was a 3-shift system proving 24-hour operation of the Sperry Rand UNIVAC 9400 Real-Time computer, with 2 senior operators Christopher Haige and Bruce Grant both having been instrumental in helping install the computer system… the first of its kind in the whole of Europe (plus UK) in 1968.

== Air travel ==
Clarksons had an air terminal at 202–204 Finchley Road, London, NW3, close to the junction with Frognal Lane. This was used for coach transport to Luton Airport, the main airport served by Court Line, which was Clarksons' main air transport supplier.

Court Line eventually had to step in and bail out the company when it went into financial difficulties as it was their largest customer. Flight International magazine estimated that in the five years before the collapse, eight million holidays had each averaged £1 below cost.

Flight International stated that the marketing of airline seats with Mediterranean hotels had given millions of ordinary people holidays once available only to the privileged and that the collapse was: "the inevitable consequence of continuing to see £25 flights for £20 and less". This was compounded by high inflation, a sinking pound, doubled fuel prices and coups in Portugal, Cyprus and Greece. On top of that was the three-day week in the key booking period. A takeover of their competitor, bankrupt Horizon Holidays, by Court Line failed to improve the financial situation.

Flight International added that the UK's Civil Aviation Authority (CAA), headed at the time by Lord Boyd-Carpenter, must bear some responsibility for CourtLine's and Clarksons' collapse and asked questions such as how interlocking companies were related. It also stated that the information should be public, as in the United States, and criticised Peter Shore, the Secretary of State for Trade at the time, for continuing the government policy of secrecy, financial unprofessionalism and hiding behind the Civil Aviation Act of 1971.

== Political repercussions ==
Clarksons held an Air Travel Organisers' Licensing (ATOL) licence and were therefore theoretically covered by their insurance bond. Unfortunately, although the 35,000 passengers stranded abroad were repatriated, there were insufficient funds for the 100,000 whose holidays had been paid in advance.

The Trade Minister, at the time, Tony Benn assured customers that none would lose money as a result of the collapse, perhaps mindful that a second General Election in 1974 was likely, as indeed it turned out. All eventually had their money returned.

== Accidents ==
On Friday evening, 3 July 1970, a Clarksons-chartered Dan Air de Havilland Comet, registration G-APDN, en route from Manchester to Barcelona deviated from the intended course and crashed into high ground at the Montseny Massif, Girona, in northern Spain. The aircraft was destroyed by impact and subsequent ground fire. There were three flight crew, four cabin crew and 105 passengers aboard. All suffered fatal injuries.

It was Dan Air's first fatal accident with fare-paying passengers. The Dan Air G-APDN Air Crash Memorial is in Padiham, Lancashire.
