= Vladimir Raitz =

Vladimir Gavrilovich Raitz (23 May 1922 – 31 August 2010) was a Russian-born British businessman who co-founded the Horizon Holiday Group, which pioneered the first mass package holidays abroad. Born in Moscow, his family were White Russian Jews who left the Soviet Union when he was six, and variously passed through Berlin and Warsaw before finally settling in London.

He attended Mill Hill School, London, and studied economics at London School of Economics. After graduating in 1942, he started work as a journalist, first for British United Press and then for Reuters from 1943 to 1949.

== Entrepreneur ==
On holiday in Calvi on Corsica in 1949, he was asked by a socialite with local connections, Nicholas Steinheid, to encourage British visitors the following year. Having calculated he could charter an aircraft and provide an all-in two-week holiday in Corsica for less than £35, he set up Horizon Holidays on 12 October 1949, and initiated the package holiday industry. The name was chosen to reflect the blue horizon that passengers would see from a plane window.

With inheritance money, he chartered aircraft and made the relevant local connections with the airport at Calvi. However, after considerable delay, it was only in March 1950 that the Ministry of Civil Aviation permitted the flights on the stipulation that they would only be for "students and teachers". A brief advertising campaign in teaching and nursing magazines offered the opportunity for a flight, sleep under canvas, sample local wines and eat a meal containing meat twice a day – this was especially attractive due to the continuing austerity measures in post-war United Kingdom. The all-inclusive price was £32.10s.-, or roughly half the cost of the return flight to Nice, the closest airport served by BEA.

== First flight ==
The first charter flight between Gatwick airport and Corsica was on 20 May 1949. After arranging to pick up passengers from King's Cross Station, eleven "teachers" (paying passengers) and 21 "friends" (guests who returned immediately) were taken by Dakota. After a refuelling stop in Lyon, the passengers arrived at Calvi 6 hours later. The holidaymakers were taken to the camping grounds of Club Franco-Britannique. Much of the canvas used in the camping were remainders from the US navy which constructed the airport in 1943.

== Retirement ==
He left Horizon in 1972 after it was taken over by Court Line (which had also previously taken over Clarksons) and became a travel consultant. Court Line went into liquidation in August 1974.

He was inducted into the British Travel Industry Hall of Fame. His personal memoir, Flight to the Sun, was published in 2001.

== Personal life ==
Raitz had 3 daughters and 5 grandchildren.
