= Court Line Flight 95 =

1974 runway incursion

Coordinates: 51.87468°N 0.36899°W

Accident
- Date: 18 April 1974
- Summary: Runway incursion
- Site: London Luton Airport
- Total fatalities: 1
- Total injuries: 1
- Total survivors: 92

First aircraft
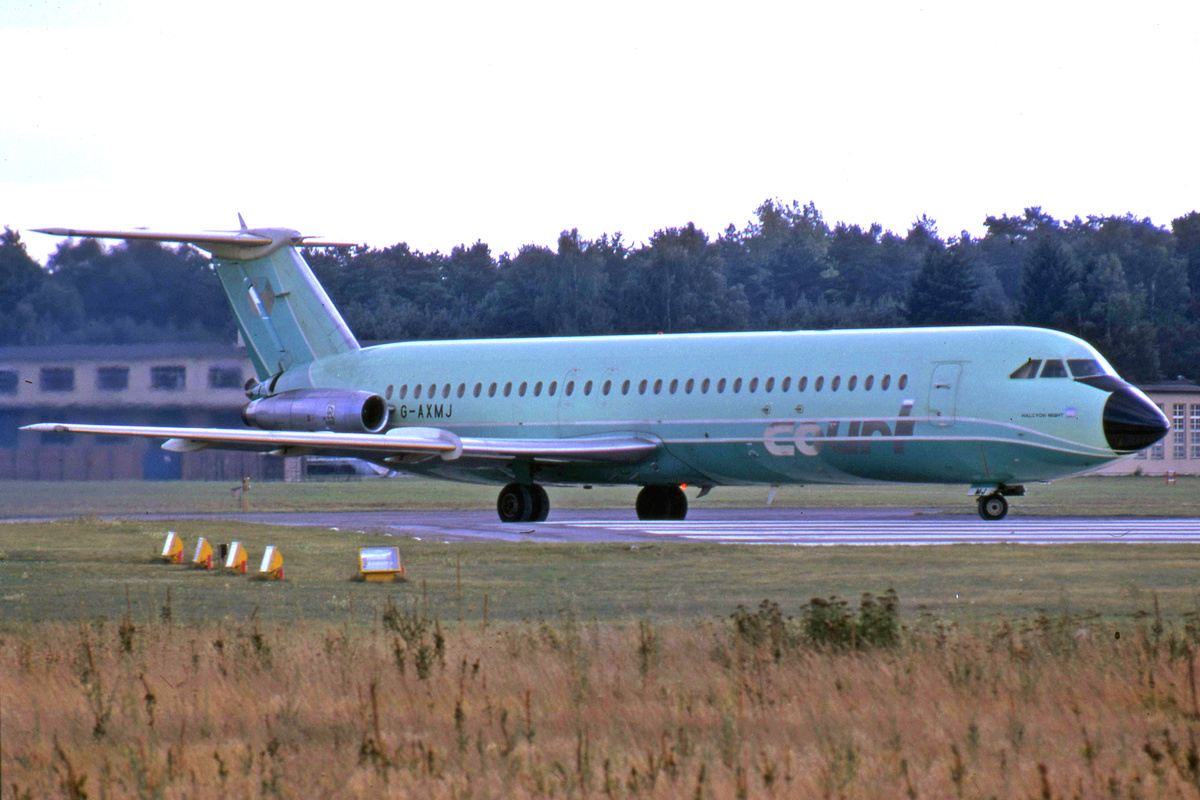
- G-AXMJ, the BAC One-Eleven 518 involved the collision, seen in 1973
- Type: BAC One-Eleven 518
- Name: Halcyon Night
- Operator: Court Line
- IATA flight No.: OU95
- Registration: G-AXMJ
- Flight origin: London Luton Airport, Bedfordshire, England
- Destination: Munich Airport, Germany
- Occupants: 91
- Passengers: 86
- Crew: 5
- Fatalities: 0
- Injuries: 0
- Survivors: 91

Second aircraft
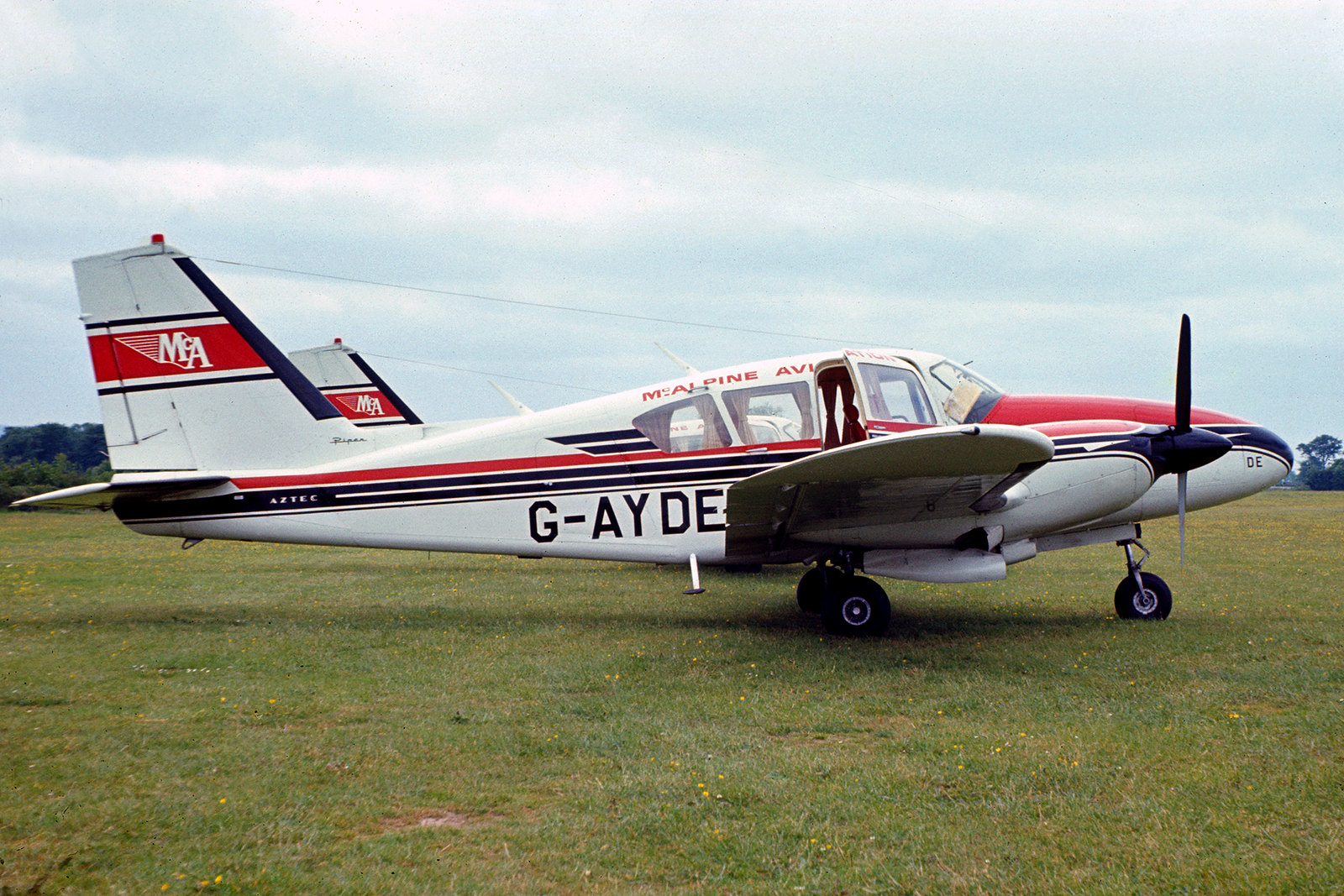
- G-AYDE, the Piper PA-23 Aztec involved the collision, seen in 1970
- Type: Piper PA-23 Aztec
- Operator: McAlpine Aviation
- Call sign: DELTA ECHO
- Registration: G-AYDE
- Flight origin: London Luton Airport
- Destination: Ringway Airport, Manchester, Greater Manchester
- Occupants: 2
- Passengers: 1
- Crew: 1
- Fatalities: 1
- Injuries: 1
- Survivors: 1

Court Line Aviation Flight 95 was an international charter flight from London Luton Airport, Bedfordshire, England, to Munich-Riem Airport, West Germany, operated on 18 April 1974 by Court Line BAC One-Eleven 518 G-AXMJ. During its take-off run, Piper PA-23 Aztec G-AYDE of McAlpine Aviation entered the active runway without permission. Although the pilots of the One-Eleven tried to take avoiding action, a collision between the two aircraft occurred, killing the pilot of the Aztec and injuring his passenger.

The pilots of the substantially damaged One-Eleven successfully aborted the take-off and the aircraft was evacuated using emergency slides, with no casualties. The Aztec was written off, but the One-Eleven was repaired and returned to service. Four recommendations were made following the accident.

== Accident ==
Flight 95 was an international charter flight from Luton, Bedfordshire, UK, to Munich-Riem, West Germany. At 15:19 Greenwich Mean Time, the One-Eleven received permission to taxi to holding point Delta where it was to await clearance. At 15:24 GMT, permission was granted for the One-Eleven to enter runway 08/26 and backtrack along Runway 08, where the aircraft was to hold at the threshold awaiting permission to take off. The One-Eleven reported it was entering Runway 08/26 between 15:25:14 and 15:25:23. At 15:25:32, the Aztec reported that it was ready to taxi. Information was given to the pilot of the Aztec that the wind was from 300° at 10 knots (19 km/h) and the pilot was offered a choice of runway 08 or runway 26 for take-off. Luton Airport has a single runway, and the pilot of the smaller aircraft chose runway 26, being the opposite end of the same runway allocated to the Court Line BAC 1-11.

At about 15:26, the Aztec was instructed "Cleared to Alpha Two Six", This was non-standard phraseology; the correct instruction should have been "Cleared to holding point Alpha, Runway Two Six". This non-standard phraseology was a causal factor in the accident. In the meantime, the One-Eleven had received clearance to take off at 15:25:24 and reported that it was rolling at 15:27:31. At 15:27:49, the Aztec was asked to report when it was ready for take-off, to which the reply was that it would be ready in 30 seconds.

The Aztec then entered the active runway, in order to backtrack along the runway to the opposite end. The passenger on board the Aztec, who was also a pilot himself, queried the pilot via the intercom as to whether or not the aircraft had been cleared to enter the runway. He did not receive an answer, and by this time the aircraft had entered the runway. At this point, the One-Eleven had reached a speed of 100 knots (190 km/h) during its take-off run. The first officer was flying the aircraft. The captain, seeing the Aztec enter the runway from the left and realising it was not going to stop, took control of the aircraft. He fully opened both throttles and steered the aircraft to the right whilst attempting to lift the port wing over the Aztec. The passenger in the Aztec saw the One-Eleven approaching and ducked before the collision occurred, but was unable to warn the pilot of the impending collision.

The port wing of the One-Eleven sliced through the cabin of the Aztec, killing the pilot instantly and injuring the passenger. The Aztec lost the top of the cabin and its propellers were damaged, while the outer 6 metres (20 ft) of the One-Eleven's port wing was substantially damaged, resulting in fuel leaking from the tank contained therein. Use of full reverse thrust and maximum braking enabled the take-off to be successfully aborted within the remaining runway length, with the damaged One-Eleven stopping 750 metres (820 yd) beyond the point of collision.

As there was a risk of fire from the leaking fuel, the commander ordered an emergency evacuation of the aircraft. Although the rear doors opened as intended and the evacuation slides deployed, both forward doors required considerable force to open them before all on board could evacuate the aircraft. No injuries were sustained in the evacuation. The investigation subsequently was able to replicate the difficulty in opening both forward doors on the One-Eleven. It was discovered that inadequate guidance from the manufacturer of the escape slides meant that they were incorrectly stowed. One door had an incorrect part fitted. A warning was issued to all One-Eleven operators and the relevant aviation authorities concerning this issue.

After the accident, some airline pilots called for general aviation aircraft to be banned from using Luton, a view which was not supported by the Guild of Air Pilots and Air Navigators

== Aircraft ==
=== BAC One-Eleven ===
The BAC One-Eleven 518 involved was registered G-AXMJ, and was built in February 1970. Following the accident, the aircraft was repaired and returned to service.

=== Piper Aztec ===
The Piper PA-23 Aztec involved was registered G-AYDE, manufactured in 1967, and bought by McAlpine Aviation in 1970.

== Investigation ==
The accident was investigated by the Accidents Investigation Branch. The final report was issued on 26 February 1975. The cause of the accident was found to be that the pilot of the Aztec entered the active runway without permission. Non-standard phraseology by the controller at Luton was found to be a contributory factor. The ground markings and signage at Luton were found to be compliant with the legislation then existing. No stop bars or stop lights were provided, nor were they required by law.

The pilots were not informed by radio of each other's movements, so may have been unaware that the runway was being used for departures in both directions. Although the radio installation on the Aztec conformed to legislation then existing, its arrangement was criticised as the passenger/co-pilot could not hear in his headset transmissions made by the pilot. Four recommendations were made; three concerning the operation of Luton Airport and one concerning the radio installation in aircraft.

== Sources ==
- Appleton, John; Cave, Ian G (1978). British Civil Aircraft Registers 1919–1978. Earl Shilton: Midland Counties Publications. ISBN 0-904597-15-6.
