= Court Line =

English shipping and airline group, 1905–1974

IATA	ICAO	Call sign
none	OU	COURTLINE
- Founded: 1905; 121 years ago(as shipping company); 1957; 69 years ago (as Argus Air Transport)
- Ceased operations: 1974; 52 years ago
- Hubs: London Luton Airport
- Fleet size: 11
- Headquarters: London (1905–1970); London Luton Airport (1970–1974)
- Key people: Sir Philip Haldin; John R Young; Edward J Posey; GHG Threlfall; WH Armstrong

Court Line was a 20th-century British tramp shipping company that was founded in 1905. In the 1960s it diversified into shipbuilding and charter aviation. Its merchant shipping interests were based in London. Its shipyards were at Appledore in Devon and Sunderland in Tyne and Wear. Its airline was based at Luton Airport in Bedfordshire. It also provided bus services in Luton and surrounding areas.

Its airline helped pioneer the concept of "cheap and cheerful" package tours to Spain and other destinations in the Mediterranean in conjunction with Clarksons Holidays, thus taking part in the establishment of a whole new way of holidaymaking for the British public.

The Court Line group, including its airline and subsidiary tour operators, Clarksons Travel Group and Horizon Travel, ceased trading on 15 August 1974, with at least £7 million owing to 100,000 holidaymakers.

== Shipping ==
House flag used by London Court Line

Philip Haldinstein was a British Jewish businessman from Norwich. He founded the tramp shipping company Haldinstein and Co Ltd in 1905. Robert Stephenson and Company launched Haldinstein's first ship, Arlington Court, at Hebburn on the River Tyne that October.

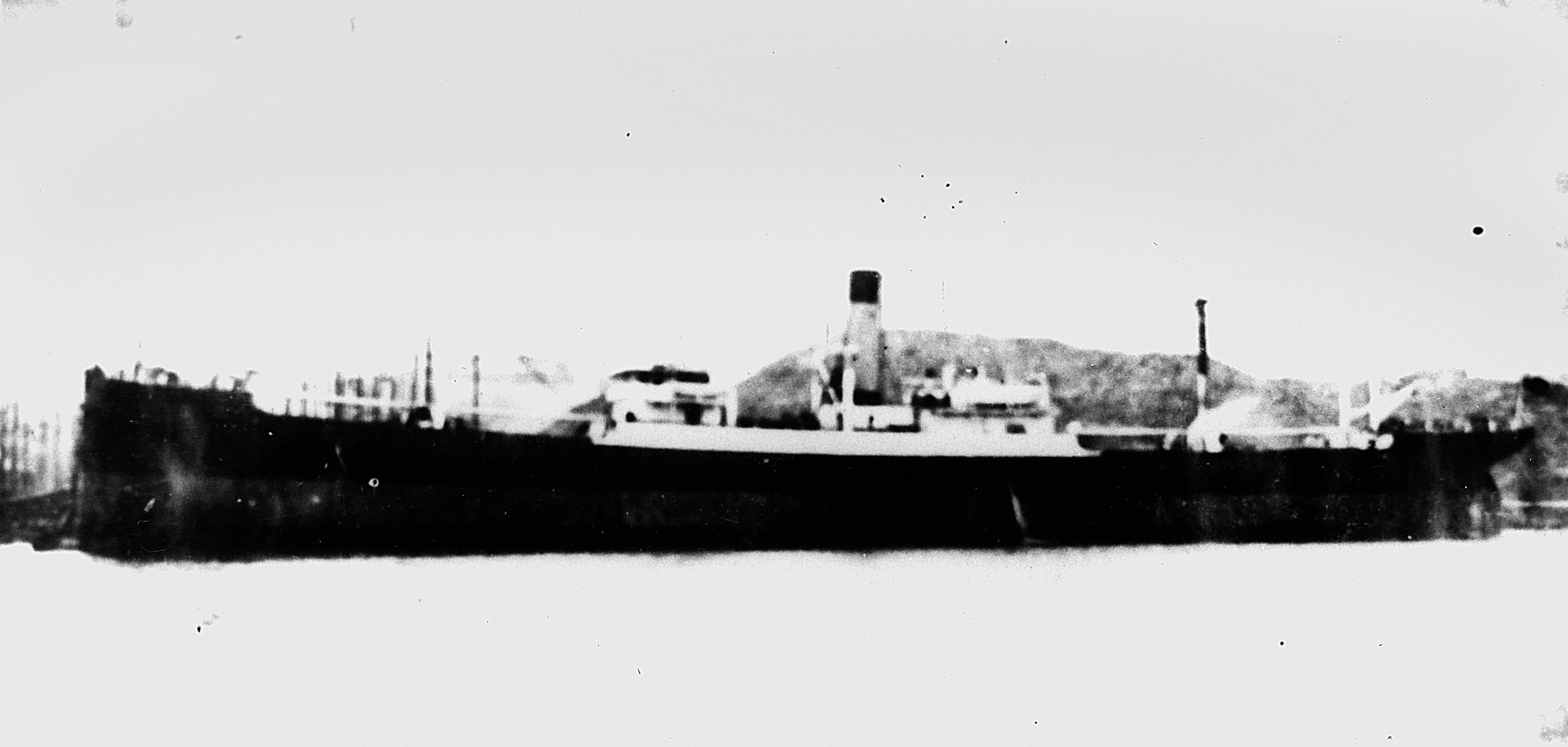
Hannington Court, built for Court Line in 1912 and sold in 1936

Between 1906 and 1912 Haldinstein added several new steamships from shipyards on the Tyne and the River Wear. When the First World War broke out in 1914, Haldinstein & Co had a fleet of seven ships and was operating as Court Line, Ltd. Anti-German sentiment arose in Britain in the war, so in 1915 Haldinstein shortened his surname to Haldin.

In 1915 Haldin bought a second-hand ship, Dalebank, which he renamed Ilvington Court. In 1917 a U-boat sank Ilvington Court in the Mediterranean, killing eight of her crew. Haldin sold several ships between 1916 and 1921, reducing his fleet to only two ships: Geddington Court and Hannington Court.

From 1924 onward Haldin expanded his fleet again. He bought a mixture of new and second-hand ships. The second-hand ones were ships that had been built just after the end of the First World War to the Shipping Controller's war standard designs. Haldin continued to name his ships in the same "—ington Court" style, and re-used some names more than once. By 1926 the fleet had 26 ships.

In 1926 Haldin registered his fleet under the name United British Steamship Co Ltd. In 1929 Richard Philipps, the youngest brother of Owen Philipps, 1st Baron Kylsant, joined Haldin in the business, which was renamed Haldin and Philipps Ltd. In the 1930s part of the fleet was laid up. In 1939 Haldin was made a Knight Bachelor.

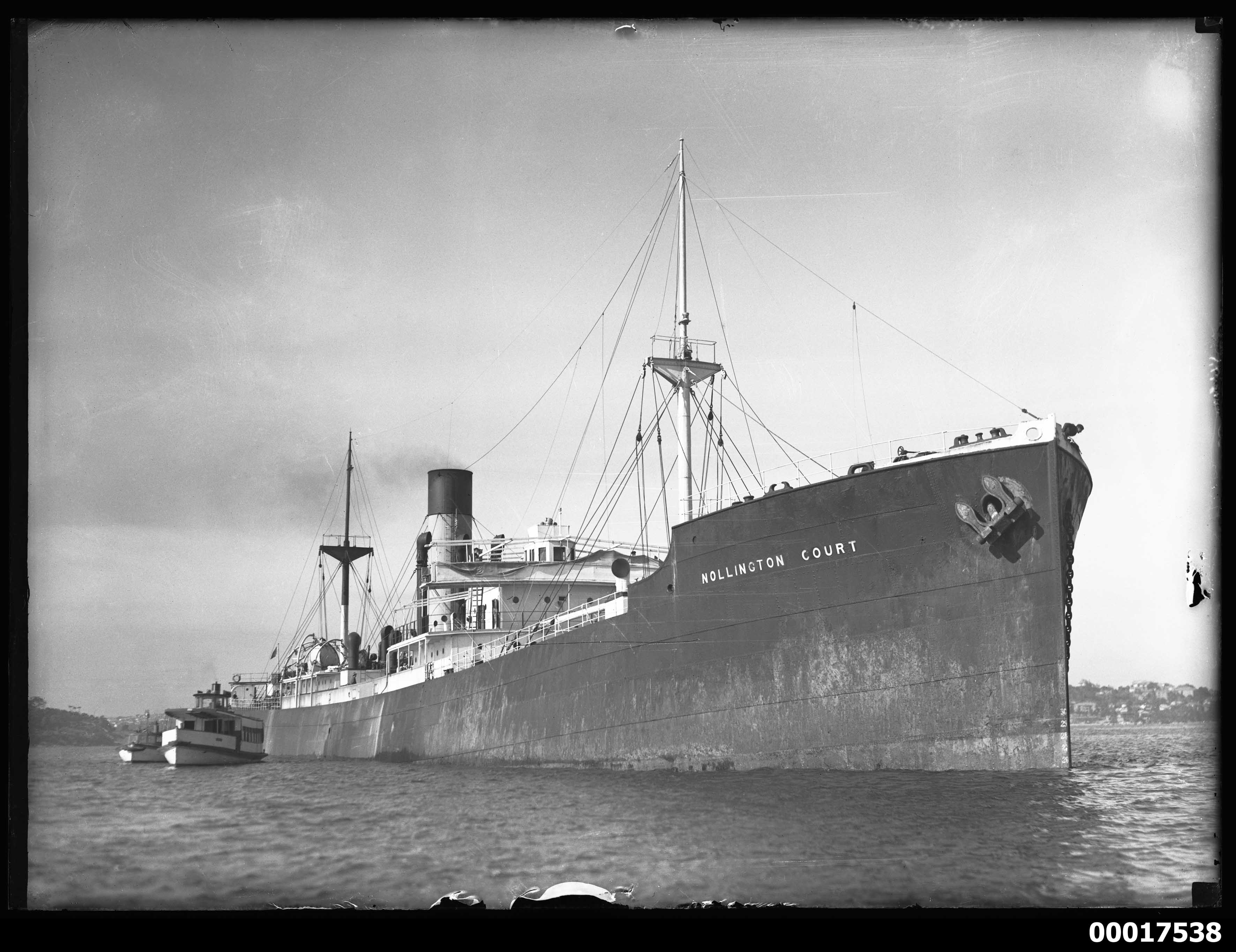
Nollington Court in 1932. She sank in the Caribbean in 1937.

In 1937 Court Line lost two ships. Nollington Court sank in the Caribbean after striking a submerged object. Less than a fortnight later, Quarrington Court sank in the Red Sea after springing a leak in a water intake in her engine room.

When the Second World War began in 1939, Haldin & Philipps Ltd had a fleet of 23 ships. In the war it lost 14 ships, 13 of them to enemy action, with the loss of 136 lives. One ship, Pennington Court, was lost with all hands.

From 1940 onward Haldin & Philipps started to manage some Empire ships for the Ministry of War Transport. In 1945 and 1946 it bought these ships and renamed them with "—ington Court" names.

In 1948 Philipps retired, and the company name reverted to Haldin & Co. Haldin died in 1953, aged 73.

From 1952 onward Haldin & Co started to buy new ships again. In the 1960s the fleet diversified into tankers. The first was Edith Borthen, which Haldin bought in 1963 and renamed Halcyon Days. The second was Halcyon Breeze, which Hitachi built for Court Line in Japan in 1964. The Admiralty chartered Halcyon Breeze as the oiler RFA Derwentdale. All Court Line tankers were named in the same "Halcyon —" style.

In 1964 Court Line bought Appledore Shipbuilders in Devon. In 1972 it took over a larger shipbuilding business, the Doxford and Sunderland Group. When the Court Line group went bankrupt in 1974, the shipyards and remaining ships in the fleet were sold.

== Aviation ==
=== Autair ===
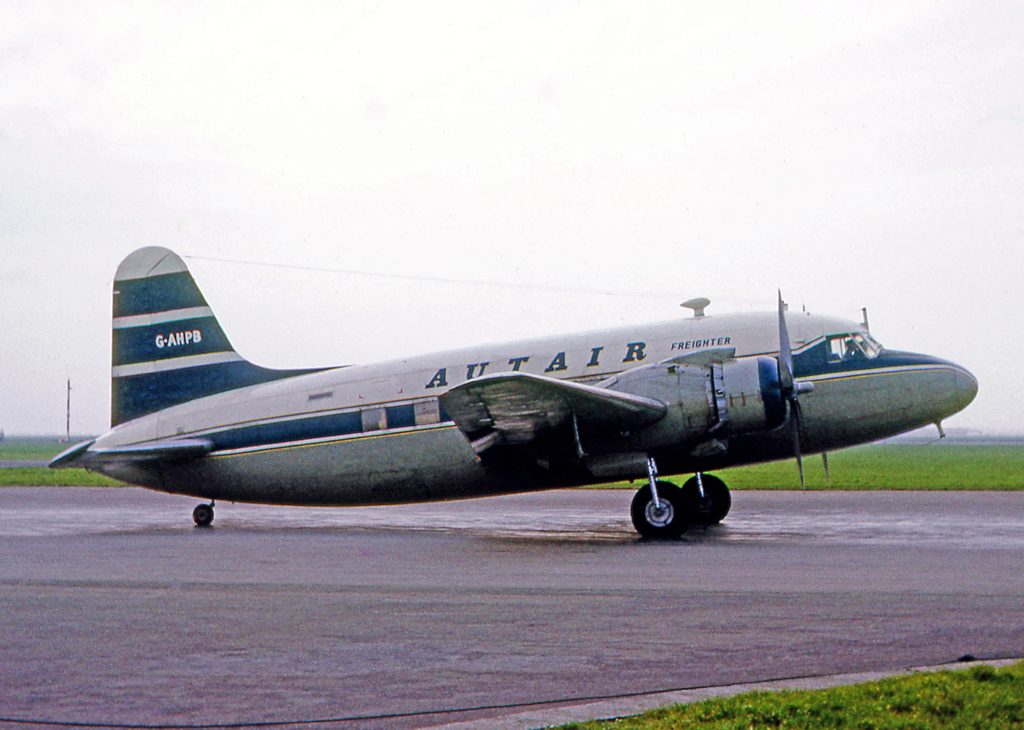
Vickers Viking freighter at Amsterdam in 1967

The airline, originally named Argus Air Transport, was formed at Luton Airport in 1957. In 1960, it became Autair (Luton) Ltd. and started operations in the following year. On 27 September 1963, it changed the corporate name to Autair International Airways Ltd..

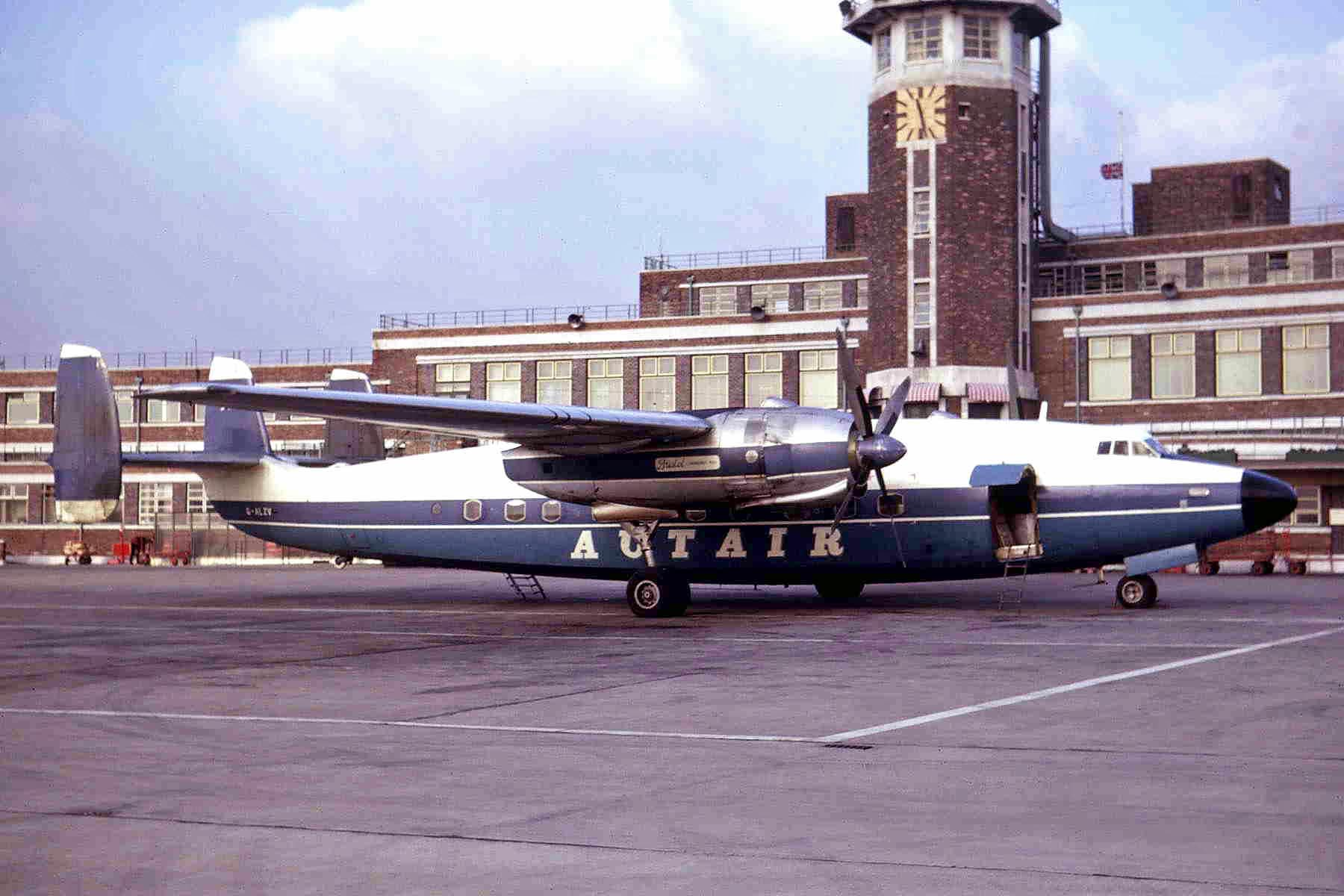
AS.57 Ambassador

Autair started as a division of Autair Helicopters, a helicopter operator established in the early 1950s. (Autair's helicopter interests were subsequently hived off into a separate company.) It began public transport operations with an ex-British European Airways (BEA) Douglas DC-3, used on contract work for other airlines. More DC-3s and Vickers Vikings were bought. The first of the latter joined the fleet in 1962. Both types operated freight and passenger services, including a growing number of inclusive tour (IT) flights.

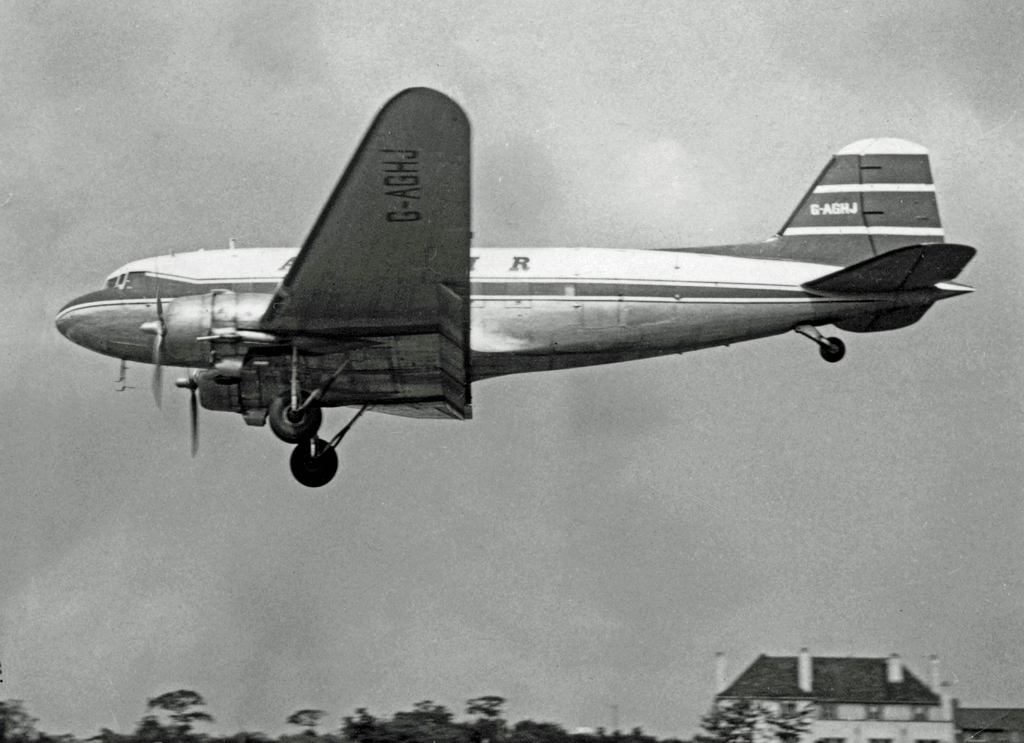
Douglas DC-3 at Manchester in 1962

One of the earliest charter customers for Autair's DC-3s was ex-naval officer Tom Gullick, who would later head Clarksons. Clarksons began its relationship with Autair by contracting the airline's Vikings to ferry day-trippers between up to ten UK departure points and Rotterdam during the Dutch bulbfield season. Airspeed Ambassadors and a leased Handley Page Herald were introduced in 1963. The former were the airline's first pressurised aircraft while the latter was its first turboprop.

On 1 October 1963, the airline commenced scheduled services between Blackpool and Luton with Vikings. The route was subsequently operated with Ambassadors and extended to Glasgow on 24 May 1966.

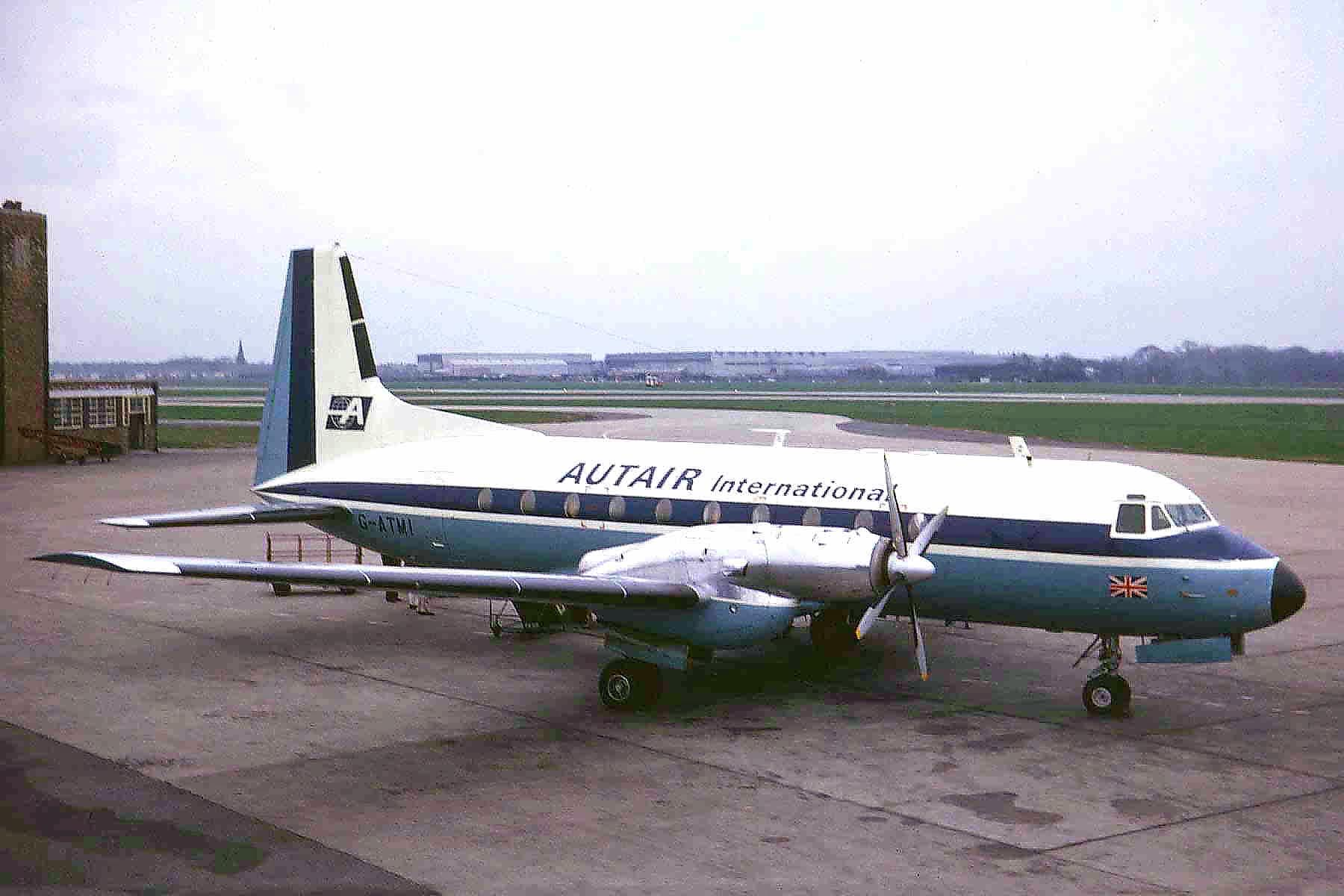
Hawker Siddeley 748

In the following years, all piston-engined aircraft types were withdrawn and replaced with Hawker Siddeley 748 and Handley Page Herald turboprops. Three Heralds operated the company's scheduled services, including the main London—Teesside route.

1960 saw the formation of Clarksons Tours (later, Clarksons Holidays) with Tom Gullick as managing director. Over the next few years, Clarksons would become Autair's and its successor Court Line's most important tour operator customer.

In April 1965 Court Line bought Autair's entire share capital for £215,000.

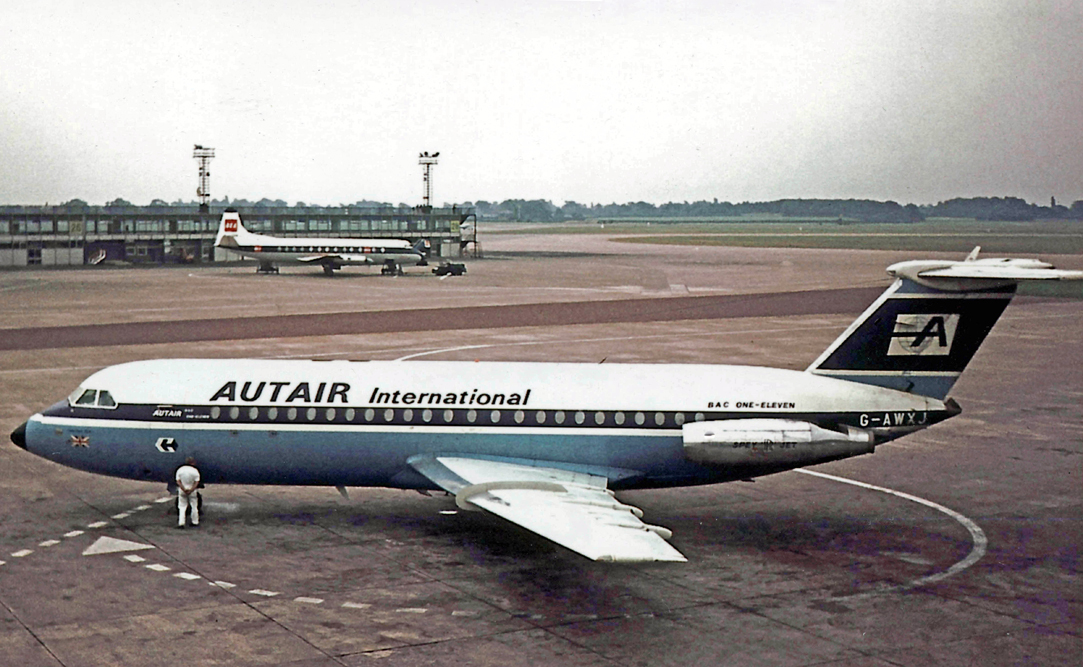
BAC One-Eleven 416EK at Manchester in 1969.

Autair became a jet operator in 1968, when three brand-new BAC One-Eleven 400 series joined its fleet. The new jets mainly operated IT flights.

1968 was also the year Clarksons' customer base had grown to 175,000 (up from 4,000 in 1964), many of whom flew to their holiday destination on Autair's new jets.

By spring 1969, five One-Eleven 400s (including an example acquired second-hand from Channel Airways) operated Autair's IT flights, primarily under contract to Clarksons Tours. These carried the bulk of the airline's half-a-million annual charter passengers, which far outnumbered the 66,000 using its scheduled services each year.

From 1 April 1969, the airline's scheduled operation in London was consolidated at Heathrow, joining Teesside services which had already transferred to London's premier airport from the company's Luton base on 1 November 1967.

In summer 1969, Autair announced its decision to withdraw all scheduled services "irrevocably", following an unsuccessful request for government subsidies. By that time, the airline's scheduled network served Belfast, Blackpool, Carlisle, the Channel Islands, Dundee, Glasgow, Hull, the Isle of Man, London and Teesside in the UK, Dublin in the Republic of Ireland and Amsterdam in the Netherlands. Scheduled services accounted for 12% of Autair's turnover. The airline's scheduled operation was estimated to have generated an annual loss of £150,000 (only London—Teesside was said to be profitable).

On 31 October 1969, scheduled services were stopped and all turboprop aircraft sold. This was followed by an order for seven of the larger 119-seat 500 series One-Eleven.

=== Court Line Aviation ===
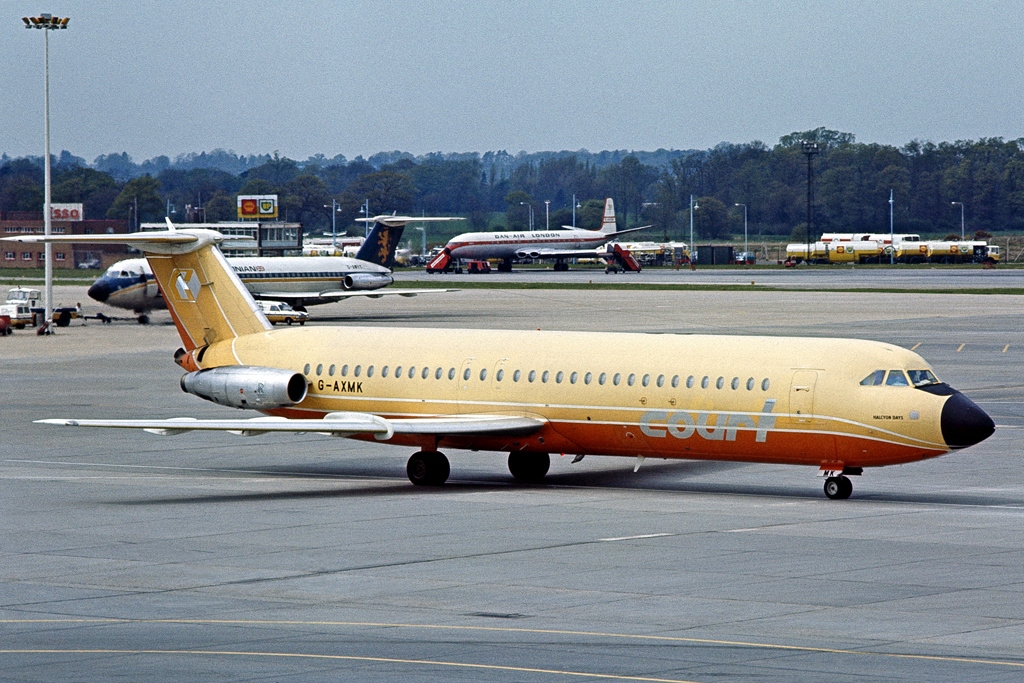
BAC One-Eleven 500 Halcyon Days, in the yellow/gold/orange scheme

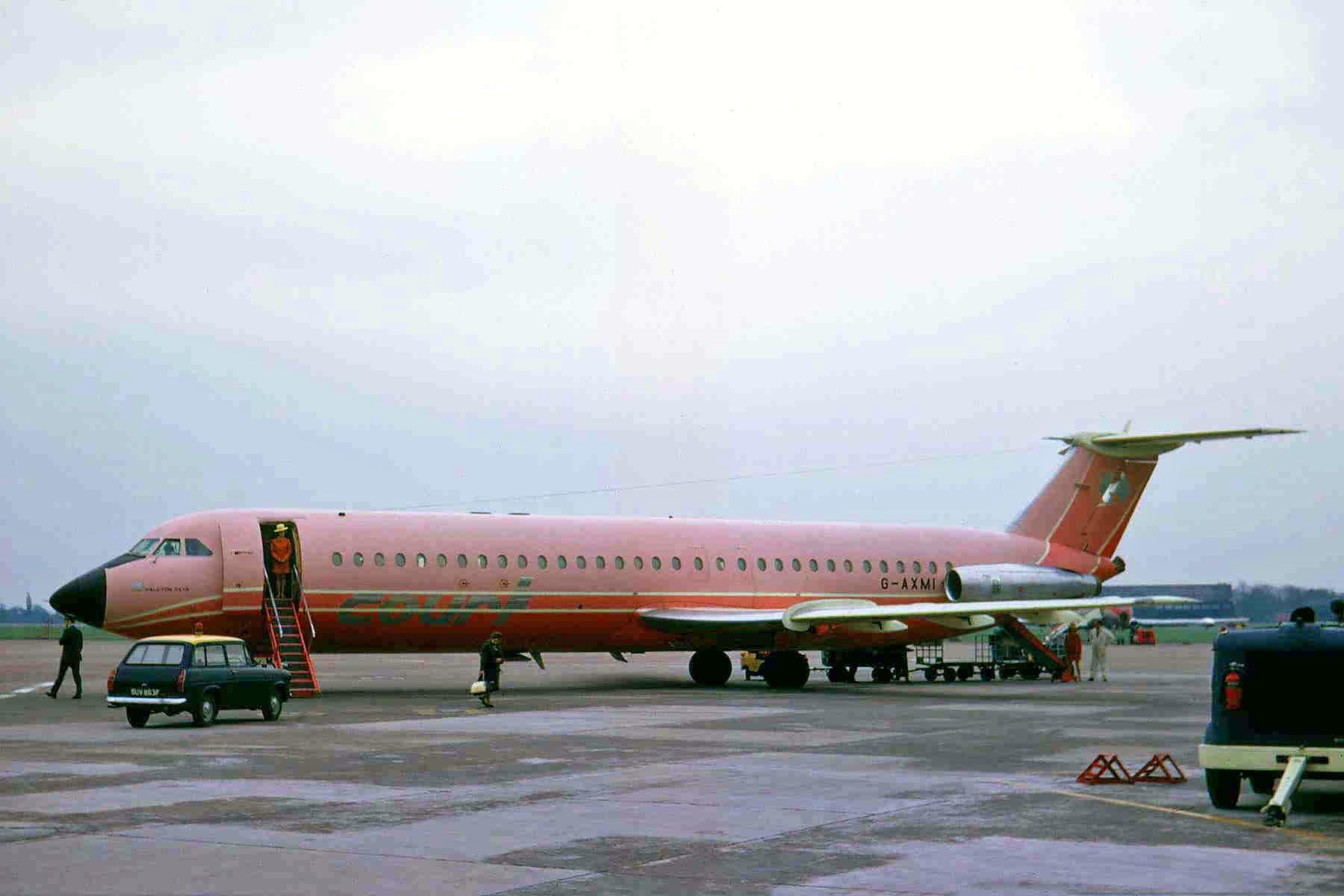
BAC One-Eleven 500 in the pink/rose/magenta scheme, 1972

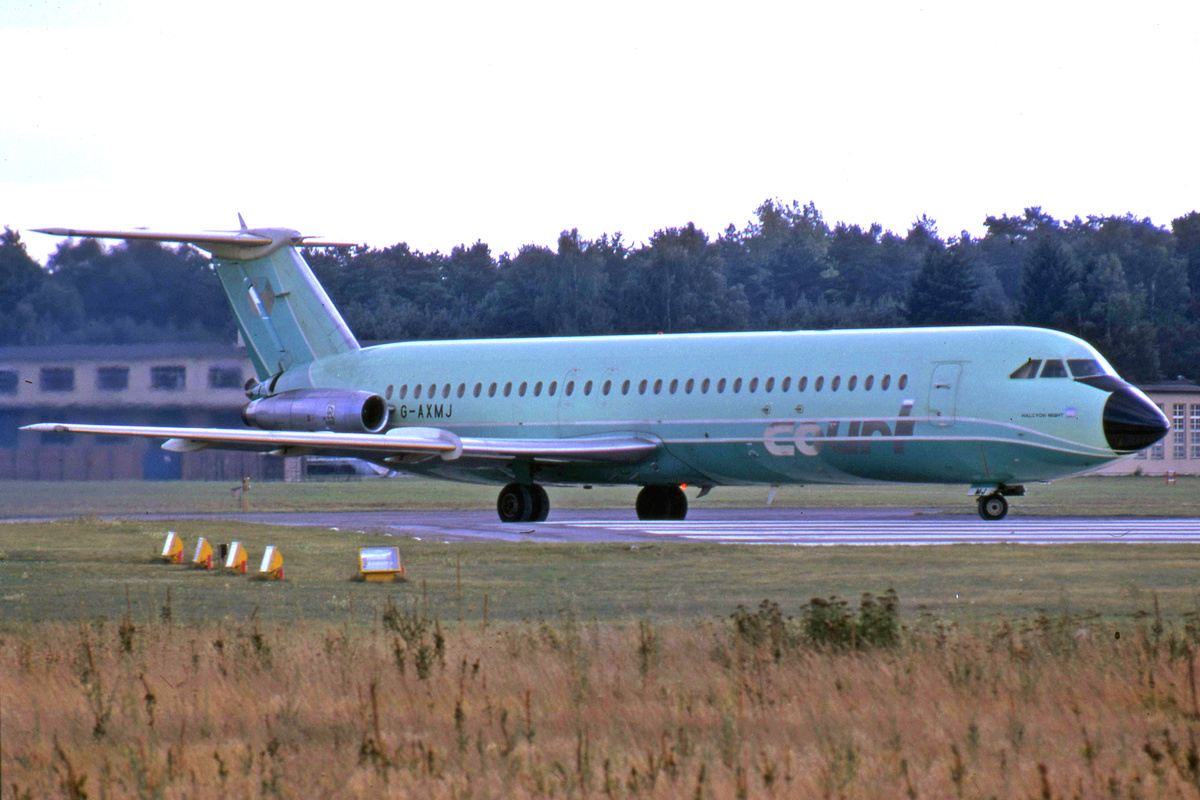
BAC One-Eleven 500Halcyon Night, in light green/mid-green/forest green scheme, 1973

To coincide with the arrival of the first BAC One-Eleven 500, the airline changed its name on 1 January 1970 to Court Line (Aviation) Ltd. and introduced a new corporate look and strategy that focused exclusively on the then fast-growing package holiday market. As the larger One-Eleven 500s were delivered, all but one of the smaller, former Autair 400 series One-Elevens were retired.

The corporate look was an all-over colour design by Peter Murdoch. In keeping with the holiday "feel-good factor", One-Elevens were painted in the following distinctive, eye-catching pastel colour combinations: yellow/gold/orange, pink/rose/magenta, pale violet/mauve/purple, light green/mid-green/forest green. As with the tankers in the shipping fleet, the aircraft were named Halcyon Breeze, Halcyon Skies, Halcyon Days, etcetera. Aircrew wore trendy uniforms designed by Mary Quant. This was part of making passengers feel that the flight was a "fun part" of their holiday. For many, it would be their first flying experience.

Other airlines and tour operators were quick to jump on the burgeoning package holiday bandwagon. This resulted in increasingly fierce competition between operators and led to a price warfare to fill planes and hotels. Under Tom Gullick's management, Shipping Industrial Holdings' subsidiary Clarksons Holidays became the undisputed cut-price leader in the IT market. By 1973, Clarksons carried 1.1 million holidaymakers—almost 1968's whole industry total—and contracted over 70% of Court Line's charter capacity. Its meteoric rise was entirely volume-based. It generated the required volumes by ruthlessly undercutting rivals and outbidding them to win the race for securing accommodation in popular overseas holiday resorts, especially in Spain. Thus, in the early 1970s, a holiday in Mallorca or on the Costa del Sol became affordable for the average person for the first time.

Court Line and Clarksons Holidays were also a UK pioneer of the "time charter" concept, whereby the airline entered into a long-term relationship with the tour operator. "Time charter" was modelled on similar long-term arrangements between ship owners and charterers in the oil tanker business. It resulted in greater economic security for the charter airline industry and enabled it to acquire new aircraft on more favourable terms.

==== "Seat-back" catering ====
Court Line invented "seat-back" catering, a new concept that permitted a reduction in the amount of galley space inside its aircraft's cabins. The extra space obtained was equivalent to three seats on the One-Eleven 400. This enabled it to increase seating densities and reduce individual seat rates to allow tour operators to hold on to their market shares in a price-sensitive environment.

The concept itself consisted of pre-packed meals or snacks – usually, Spam salads out and sandwiches back — loaded into a small, two-shelf compartment in the seat back in front of each passenger. The meal/snack for the outbound journey could be found in the top compartment, the one for the return trip in the lower section. The latter contained a pellet of dry ice placed under the plastic food container, thus preventing the food from spoiling. For the airline's cabin staff, it eliminated handling trays while airborne and resulted in a reduction of their workload. To prevent outbound passengers from consuming meals intended for return passengers, locks needed to be installed on the lower compartment that could only be opened by cabin staff during the aircraft's turnaround at the destination airport (although these were not always effective at deterring determined passengers).

In addition to Court Line/Clarksons, Great Universal Stores (GUS) subsidiary Global was a major proponent of "seat-back" catering among the UK's leading contemporary tour operators. It demanded that package holiday costs be driven down to the bare minimum by replacing the traditional meal service on holiday charter flights with something much cheaper that would simply give passengers "a slice of pie". Industry insiders referred to Global's new inflight catering concept as Global Pie. The cost advantage industry leaders such as Court Line/Clarksons and Global gained over their rivals as a result of their onboard catering innovation eventually forced every other major UK charter airline to adopt "seat-back" catering on most flights serving short- and medium-haul IT destinations.

==== Widebody era ====
In 1973, Court Line took delivery of a pair of Lockheed L-1011 TriStars and became the first European airline to operate the Lockheed widebody. The aircraft were acquired on long-term lease from Airlease International, a consortium of eleven British banks and financial institutions. They were uniquely customised for Court with double-width doors to speed up passenger evacuation and featured integral passenger stairs and baggage conveyors to facilitate operations at smaller airports. The introduction of these brand-new widebodies was a big gamble for a small airline operating in a seasonal market with tight margins as the new jets had four times the One-Eleven's passenger capacity (476 vs 119).

Court took the view with Clarksons that the market would grow and that such large aircraft could be operated profitably. In addition, Clarksons was looking to expand further into cruise holidays and new markets in the US and the Caribbean. This, at the time, was wholly new territory for the UK package tour market.

The acquisition of Leeward Islands Air Transport (LIAT), a regional airline based in the Caribbean, in 1972 was part of Court's long-haul expansion strategy. Court Line provided LIAT with BAC One-Eleven series 500 aircraft for scheduled passenger services in the Caribbean. The BAC One-Eleven was the only jet aircraft type ever operated by LIAT.

The introduction of the TriStar led to an increase in maintenance personnel and the modification of an existing hangar at the airline's Luton base to accommodate the new widebody. It also resulted in the purchase of a former Royal Air Force Blackburn Beverley cargo transporter from the Royal Aircraft Establishment to airlift Rolls-Royce RB211 replacement engines and/or other essential spares in case the planes developed a serious technical fault at an overseas station that prevented them from returning to Luton (although in fact the Beverley was never civil registered and so was never used).

The airline's total investment in widebodied equipment amounted to US$55 million.

==== Hard times ====
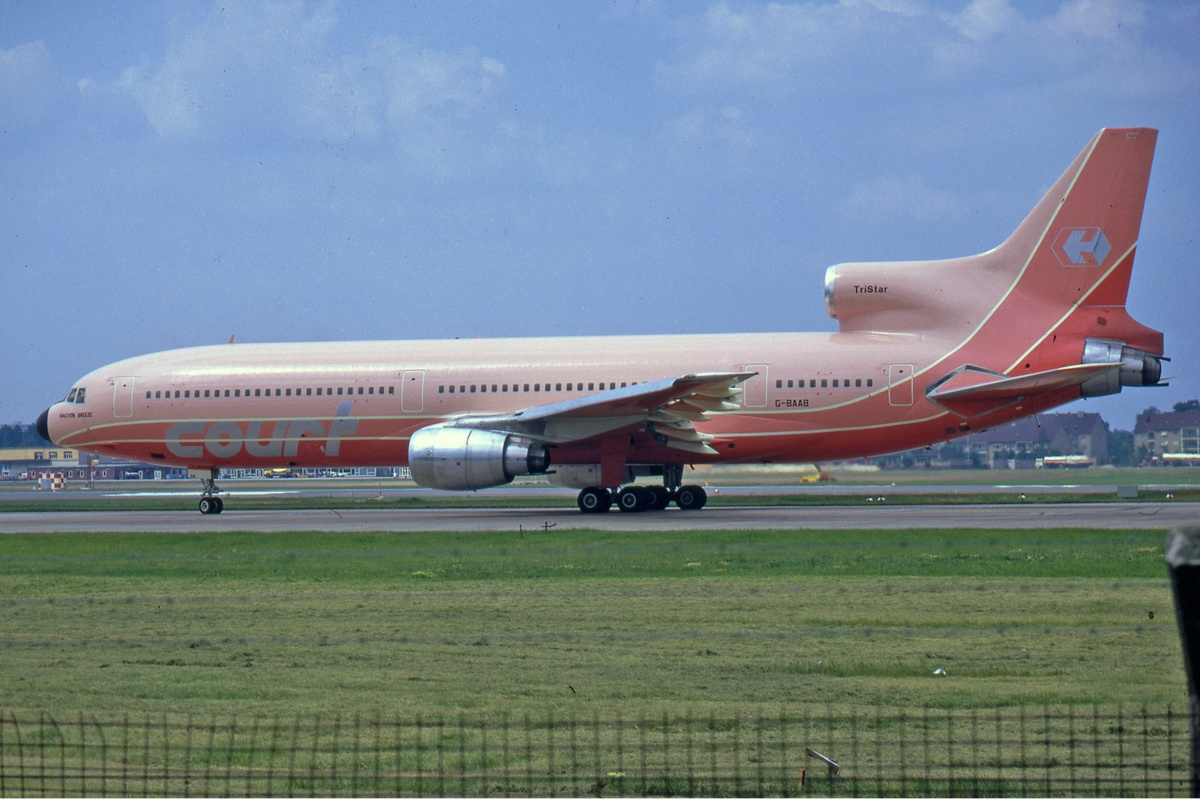
Lockheed TriStar Halcyon Breeze, 1973

As early as 1971, Clarksons lost as much as £2.6 million despite increasing its turnover by £9 million to £31 million. Industry sources estimated that this equated to a loss of £4 per head.

In 1972, Clarksons's loss grew to £4.8 million. This was almost 2½ times as much as the combined loss of Thomson Holidays (£1.6 million) and Horizon Holidays (£388,000), its closest rivals.

By 1973, Clarksons carried over a million passengers and accounted for 40% of Court Line's turnover.

During the 1973–74 winter season, Clarksons's plight worsened. At the time, the UK was in the grip of a recession, as a result of the early 1970s energy crisis caused by the Organization of Petroleum Exporting Countries' oil boycott of the West in the aftermath of the 1973 Arab–Israeli War. This was a punitive measure directed against these countries for their support of Israel during that war. It led to a drastic reduction in the availability of petroleum products – including jet fuel. This in turn resulted in a tripling of the oil price in October 1973 and a subsequent quadrupling.

1974 became known as the worst year for the UK package tour industry. At the beginning of the year, Britain plunged into the three-day working week, as a consequence of the miners' strike that had been called to topple the Heath Government. This immediately reduced package holiday bookings by 30%. Clarksons, Court Line's main customer and in-house tour operator since April 1973, was facing mounting financial pressure, and Vladimir Raitz's Horizon Holidays, another of the airline's major customers, collapsed during that time. Following Court Line's takeover of Clarksons the previous year for a nominal £1 (excluding a £3.4 million "subsidy" from the airline's parent company to cover the tour operator's projected 1973 loss), it purchased the Horizon group's goodwill for £600,000—including the acquisition of 58% of Horizon Midlands for £400,000—from the administrator. The deal, which became effective in February 1974, was based on payment of £1 for each Horizon customer Court Line expected to carry over the following three years. The airline's decision to purchase Clarksons as well as Horizon was intended to protect its business. In reality, these deals did little to help improve Court Line's increasingly bleak prospects.

As soon as Court Line began diverting Horizon customers onto its planes, British Caledonian (BCal) threatened having Horizon compulsorily wound up if Court Line did not agree to settle Horizon's outstanding debts of over £100,000. BCal's threat forced Court Line to sub-charter a fully crewed BCal One-Eleven jet for Horizon's flying programme and to provide it with additional business. In addition to BCal forcing Court Line to compensate it for the loss of Horizon's business, Thomas Cook's money-back guarantee – a scheme widely copied by other rival tour operators – further reduced the number of Horizon holidaymakers travelling on Court Line's jets. As a result, Court Line carried far fewer Horizon customers than it had anticipated. Clarksons's financial position further deteriorated. In a desperate attempt to fill the group's planes and hotel rooms so that it could stay afloat, Clarksons continued selling holiday packages below cost, with a fortnight all-inclusive holiday to Mallorca selling for as little as £50.

==== Bankruptcy ====
A deal between the Court Line group and the Wilson Government to sell the former's shipyards at Appledore and Sunderland to the latter for £60 million turned out to be "too little too late" to stave off the company's impending collapse.

On 15 August 1974, Court Line went bankrupt, with all flights cancelled, its fleet comprising two TriStars and nine One-Eleven 500s grounded, all 1,150 staff losing their jobs and as many as 49,000 holidaymakers stranded overseas with no means of getting home. To enable stranded holidaymakers to return to the UK at no additional cost to them, the collapsed group's rivals organised an airlift through the Tour Operators' Study Group (TOSG), the package holiday industry association. This operation was paid for using the £3.5m bond the failed group's tour operators had deposited with TOSG.

The Association of British Travel Agents (ABTA) set up a fund to provide an insurance against such an event in the future. This was a compulsory bonding scheme for travel companies that transported their customers by air. It was administered by TOSG.

On 16 August 1974, all of the group's UK-based subsidiaries went into voluntary liquidation. This included Court Line Aviation and Clarksons Holidays.

Leeward Islands Air Transport (LIAT) in the Caribbean as well as South Africa-based Court Line Helicopters were among Court Line's overseas subsidiaries. Both survived the UK parent company's collapse. LIAT subsequently withdrew the BAC One-Eleven series 500 aircraft from its fleet which had been provided by Court Line.

The Court Line Coaches subsidiary, although itself solvent and having most of its work from sources other than Court Line Aviation, was wound up shortly afterwards. Commercial Motor of 23 August 1974 noted that "Court Line's coach fleet continues operations 'for the present'. A go ahead to stay in operation has been given to Court Line Coaches Ltd by Mr Rupert Nicholson, who has been appointed to wind up the Court Line holiday giant which collapsed last week. Court Line Coaches has a fleet of 59 coaches and its managing director Mr Ron Keech told CM on Tuesday that the company has been told it could continue trading. He had however, "no idea" what might happen in a few months' time."

==== Factors behind collapse ====
Besides the early-1970s oil crisis and the three-day week, other factors also contributed to the collapse of the group of companies that included Court Line and Clarksons.

One factors was the parent company's precariously highly geared investment in the shipping and leisure industry sectors.

The Department of Trade and Industry final report into the Court Line collapse concludes:

"The short answer is that there was no single reason for the collapse, which was caused by a number of contributory factors. Court Line expanded rapidly in many directions, some of which were both logical and justifiable, others not. The overall management was throughout inadequate and it was in any event never supported by the necessary financial control. This meant that as Court Line expanded, it became progressively vulnerable to any substantial setback in any of its areas of activities. When a serious setback occurred, triggered off by the oil crisis of autumn 1973, it immediately affected the shipping, aviation, and leisure divisions. The group was so highly geared, so structured and having such inadequate financial control, that it might well have been brought down by a substantial reverse in any of its major activities. As it was the cumulative effect on all three divisions, when all the cash resources which would otherwise have been available had been invested unprofitably in the Caribbean, meant that the position progressively deteriorated and rendered the collapse in August 1974 unavoidable.

==== Disposal of airline's assets ====
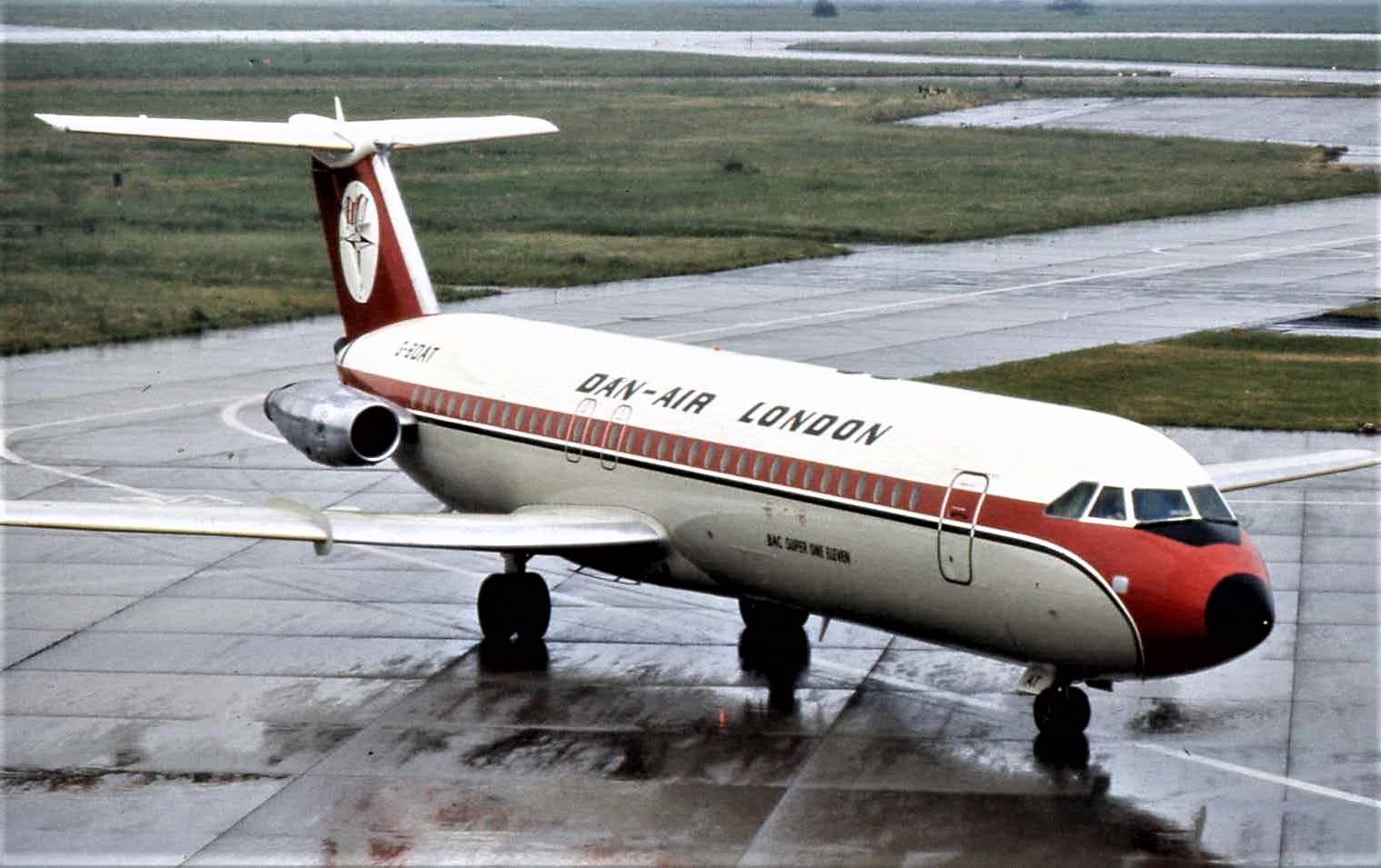
One of four BAC One-Eleven 500s Dan-Air acquired in 1974 following Court Line's bankruptcy.

Following the spectacular crash of Court Line and Clarksons at the height of the 1974 holiday season, the failed carrier's fairly new aircraft were acquired by other airlines. Cathay Pacific took the two L-1011 TriStar widebodies while Dan-Air and Monarch Airlines respectively purchased four and two of the One-Eleven 500 narrowbodies. These aircraft needed to be re-registered to avoid having them impounded by overseas airport authorities in lieu of the airport user charges Court Line owed them.

=== Fixed-wing aircraft operated ===
==== Autair ====
- 3 x AS.57 Airspeed Ambassador
- 5 x BAC One-Eleven 400
- 7 x Douglas DC-3
- 1 x Douglas DC-4
- 5 x Handley Page Dart Herald 2 leased
- 2 x Hawker Siddeley HS 748
- 6 x Vickers Viking 1 never operated

==== Court Line ====
- 1 x BAC One-Eleven 400
- 15 x BAC One-Eleven 500
- 2 x Lockheed L-1011 TriStar 1

=== Fleet and employee data ===
==== 1970 ====
Court Line fleet in 1970
Aircraft	Number
BAC One-Eleven 500	7
BAC One-Eleven 400	1
Total	8

Court Line employed 670 people at that time (as of March 1970).

==== 1974 ====
Court Line fleet in 1974
Aircraft	Number
Lockheed L-1011 TriStar 1	2
BAC One-Eleven 500	9
Total	11

Court Line employed 1,150 people at that time (as of March 1974).

== Accidents and incidents ==
Autair suffered two accidents, one of which involved the loss of lives.

1. The first of these occurred on 14 September 1967. One of the airline's Ambassadors (registration: G-ALZS) overran the runway at Luton Airport at the end of a non-scheduled passenger flight from Luxembourg. The aircraft had approached Luton in darkness. Visibility was 5,900 ft (1,800 m) and the cloud base 300 ft (91 m). Following touchdown, the pilot in command retracted the aircraft's flaps in the takeoff position and applied brakes intermittently. The aircraft overran the runway and came to a stop in soft clay. This caused the undercarriage to collapse. The aircraft was damaged beyond repair and had to be written off. However, there were no fatalities among the 69 occupants (four crew and 65 passengers).
2. The second took place on 23 December 1967. A Hawker Siddeley HS 125 (registration: G-AVGW, owned by The Beecham Group and operated by Autair International) crashed shortly after taking off from Luton Airport, killing both pilots. The aircraft had been on a training flight and the crash occurred when the crew simulated an engine failure on takeoff. The HS 125 lost height rapidly and hit the roof of a nearby factory, resulting in a post-crash fire.
3. On 18 April 1974, BAC One-Eleven G-AXMJ was involved in a ground collision with Piper PA-23 Aztec G-AYDE during take-off from Luton Airport, Bedfordshire. The Aztec had entered the active runway without permission. The pilot of the Aztec was killed and his passenger was injured. The One-Eleven aborted its take-off and an emergency evacuation was performed with all 93 people on board escaping uninjured. The Aztec was written off and the substantially damaged One-Eleven was repaired and returned to service.
4. A Court Line BAC One-Eleven leased to Cyprus Airways was stranded in 1974 at Nicosia Airport following the Turkish invasion of Cyprus. It was retrieved by British Airways engineers in 1977, but was immediately impounded on its arrival in Britain by Court Line's insurers to help pay off the debts the now defunct company owed. The aircraft was returned to Cyprus Airways in 1978 and remained in service until 1985.

== See also ==
- List of defunct airlines of the United Kingdom
