= Horizon Travel =

British package holiday company, 1949–1974

Horizon Travel or the Horizon Holiday Group was a British package holiday company which was one of the first ventures in the package holiday market.

== Foundation ==
The company was co-founded by Vladimir Raitz and Lenny Koven on 12 October 1949. The company organised the first mass package holidays abroad with charter flights between Gatwick airport and Corsica in 1950, and organized the first package holiday to Palma in 1952, Lourdes in 1953, and the Costa Brava and Sardinia in 1954. In addition, the amendments made in Montreal to the Convention on International Civil Aviation on 14 June 1954 created the impetus for mass tourism using charter planes to Spain.

In 1974, Horizon was taken over by the Clarksons Travel Group, part of Court Line which went bankrupt in August that year.
