= Tom Gullick =

English birdwatcher (1931–2023)

Tom Gullick (7 March 1931 – 26 June 2023) was an English businessman, birdwatcher, conservationist and Royal Navy flag lieutenant to Admiral Sir John Eccles.

Gullick served in the Royal Navy until 1958, leaving to join H. Clarkson, a shipbrokers, where he started their package holiday business, Clarksons Travel Group. He was managing director of Clarksons Holidays, in 1970 Britain's largest tour operator.

He left that business in 1972 and leased land in La Mancha, central Spain, where he hosted shoots for red-legged partridge and organised close season birdwatching tours in Spain, Portugal and Morocco. He also worked in conserving the Spanish population of the white-headed duck, leasing land and covertly importing white-headed duck eggs from Pakistan, eventually reintroducing ducks he raised into Doñana National Park.

As a birdwatcher he was the first person to record over 9,000 species in the world. Gullick died in Spain on 26 June 2023 at the age of 92.
