= Package tour =

Type of tourism

A package tour, package vacation, or package holiday comprises transport and accommodation advertised and sold together by a vendor known as a tour operator. Other services may be provided such as a rental car, activities or outings during the holiday. Transport can be via automobile, bus, or charter airline and may also include travel between areas as part of the holiday. Package holidays are a form of product bundling.

Package holidays are organised by tour operators and sold to consumers by travel agents. Some travel agents are employees of tour operators, while others are independent.

== History ==
=== Organised tours ===
The first organised tours date back to Thomas Cook who, on 5 July 1841, chartered a train to take a group of temperance campaigners from Leicester to a rally in Loughborough, 18 kilometres (11 mi) away. By 1872 he was undertaking worldwide tours, albeit with small groups. His company, Thomas Cook & Son (commonly called Thomas Cook or simply "Cook's"), grew to become one of the largest and most well-known travel agents before being nationalised in 1948.

With the gradual decline of visits to British seaside resorts after the Second World War, Thomas Cook & Son began promoting foreign holidays (particularly Italy, Spain and Switzerland) in the early 1950s. Information films were shown at town halls throughout Britain. However they made a costly decision by not going into the new form of cheap holidays which combined the transport and accommodation arrangements into a single 'package'. The company went further into decline and were only rescued by a consortium buy-out on 26 May 1972.

=== Group tours ===
Vladimir Raitz, the co-founder of the Horizon Holiday Group, pioneered the first mass package holidays abroad with charter flights between Gatwick airport and Corsica in 1950, and organised the first package holiday to Palma in 1952, Lourdes in 1953, and the Costa Brava and Sardinia in 1954. In addition, the amendments made in Montreal to the Convention on International Civil Aviation on 14 June 1954 was very liberal to Spain, allowing impetus for mass tourism using charter planes.

By the late 1950s and 1960s, these cheap package holidays — which combined flight, transfers, and accommodation — provided the first chance for most people in the United Kingdom to have affordable travel abroad. One of the first charter airlines was Euravia, which commenced flights from Manchester Airport in 1961 and Luton Airport in 1962. Despite opening up mass tourism to Crete and the Algarve in 1970, the package tour industry declined during the 1970s. On 15 August 1974, the industry was shaken by the collapse of the second-largest tour operator, Court Line, which operated under the brand names of Horizon and Clarksons. Nearly 50,000 tourists were stranded overseas and a further 100,000 people faced the loss of booking deposits.

In 2005 a growing number of consumers were avoiding package holidays and were instead travelling with budget airlines and booking their own accommodation. In the UK, the downturn in the package holiday market led to the consolidation of the tour operator market, which is now dominated by a few large tour operators. The major operators were Thomson Holidays and First Choice part of TUI AG and Thomas Cook AG. Thomas Cook Group ceased operations in 2019 due to bankruptcy. As of 2023, Jet2holidays is the UK's largest tour operator, with TUI UK following in second place. Under these umbrella brands are different holiday operators catering to different markets, such as Club 18-30, traveleze Jet2CityBreaks and Jet2Villas.

The trend for package holiday bookings saw a comeback in 2009, as customers sought greater financial security in the wake of a number of holiday and flight companies going bust, and as the hidden costs of 'no-frills' flights increased. Coupled with the search for late holidays as holidaymakers left booking to the last moment, this led to a rise in consumers booking package holidays.

== Dynamic packaging ==
Dynamic packaging is a method that is becoming increasingly used in package holiday booking procedures that enables consumers to build their own package of flights, accommodation, and rental car instead of a pre-defined package.

Dynamic packaging allows guests to create their own vacation, similar to a private or custom tour. This method allows guests to use a company's itinerary or create their own to allow for more flexible options while using an agency's services.

== Combination trip ==
The combination trip is a newer form of package tour that allows travellers to visit multiple destinations with a single, bundled itinerary. Unlike traditional single-location packages, these trips include flights, accommodations, and intercity transportation, often at a discounted rate, making them ideal for travellers seeking diverse experiences, such as a multi-city tour of Europe.

Travel providers often design themed routes, including self-drive, city, beach, and round-trip options. These providers allow travelers to choose their preferred transportation and lodging through dynamic packaging models (see above).

These combination trip packages offer a blend of multiple destinations, varied transportation options (flights, trains, buses, and boats), and accommodations ranging from hotels and boutique hotels to hostels. These trips cater to different budgets and travel styles. They offer structured itineraries while allowing for personal customization.

== See also ==
- Escorted tour
- Hotel consolidator
- Tourism
