= Netherton =

Netherton is the name of several places:

== England ==
- Netherton, Cornwall, a hamlet
- Netherton, Farway, a manor house in Devon
- Netherton, Hampshire
- Netherton (ward), an electoral ward in Hyndburn, Lancashire
- Netherton, Merseyside
- Netherton, Northumberland
- Netherton, Oxfordshire
- Netherton, Peterborough, Cambridgeshire
- Netherton, Teignbridge, a location in Devon
- Netherton, West Midlands
  - Netherton Tunnel Branch Canal
- West Yorkshire
  - Netherton, Kirklees
  - Netherton, Wakefield
- Netherton, Worcestershire

== Scotland ==
- Netherton, Glasgow
- Netherton, North Lanarkshire
- Netherton, Perth and Kinross
- Netherton, Stirling

== New Zealand ==
- Netherton, New Zealand, a locality in Waikato Region

== See also ==
- Nethertown, Cumbria
