= Nethercote =

Nethercote may refer to:

- Nethercote, Banbury, Oxfordshire, England
- Nethercote, New South Wales, Australia, in Bega Valley Shire
- Nethercote, Oxfordshire, a former hamlet in Middle Aston, England
- Nethercote, Warwickshire, a location
- Nethercote, a farm in the Exmoor village Winsford, Somerset, England
- Henry Nethercote, (1819–1886) English cricketer

== See also ==
- Newton Nethercote, a settlement in Leicestershire, England
