= Netherton, Oxfordshire =

Hamlet in Oxfordshire, England

Coordinates: 51.697°N 1.397°W

Netherton
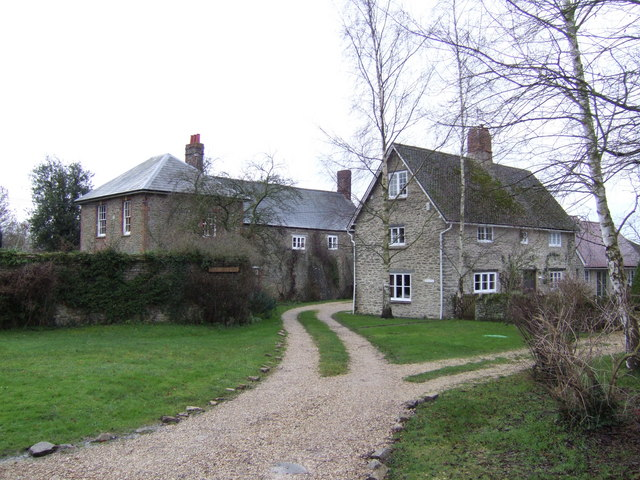
- Painton's Farm, Netherton

- Location within Oxfordshire
- OS grid reference: SU4198
- Civil parish: Fyfield and Tubney
- District: Vale of White Horse
- Shire county: Oxfordshire
- Region: South East
- Country: England
- Sovereign state: United Kingdom
- Post town: Abingdon
- Postcode district: OX13
- Dialling code: 01865
- Police: Thames Valley
- Fire: Oxfordshire
- Ambulance: South Central
- UK Parliament: Wantage

Netherton is a hamlet in Fyfield and Tubney civil parish about 5.5 miles (9 km) west of Abingdon. Formerly in the parish of Fyfield before it merged with Tubney in 1952, it was part of Berkshire until the 1974 boundary changes transferred it to Oxfordshire. The toponym is derived from the Old English neotherra meaning "lower, nether" and dun meaning "hill". It was recorded as Netendon in 1193. Netherton is primarily residential. Netherton is linked with Oxford by Pulhams Coaches route 63 bus that runs on Mondays to Fridays.
