= Needwood =

Needwood may refer to:

- Needwood, Staffordshire, a location in England
- Barton-under-Needwood, large village in Staffordshire, England
- Lake Needwood, 75-acre (300,000 m^{2}) reservoir in Derwood, Maryland just east of Rockville, Montgomery County, United States
- Needwood Forest, large area of ancient woodland in Staffordshire, England which was largely lost at the end of the 18th century
