= Dan-Air =

Airline of the United Kingdom (1953–1992)

Dan Air Services

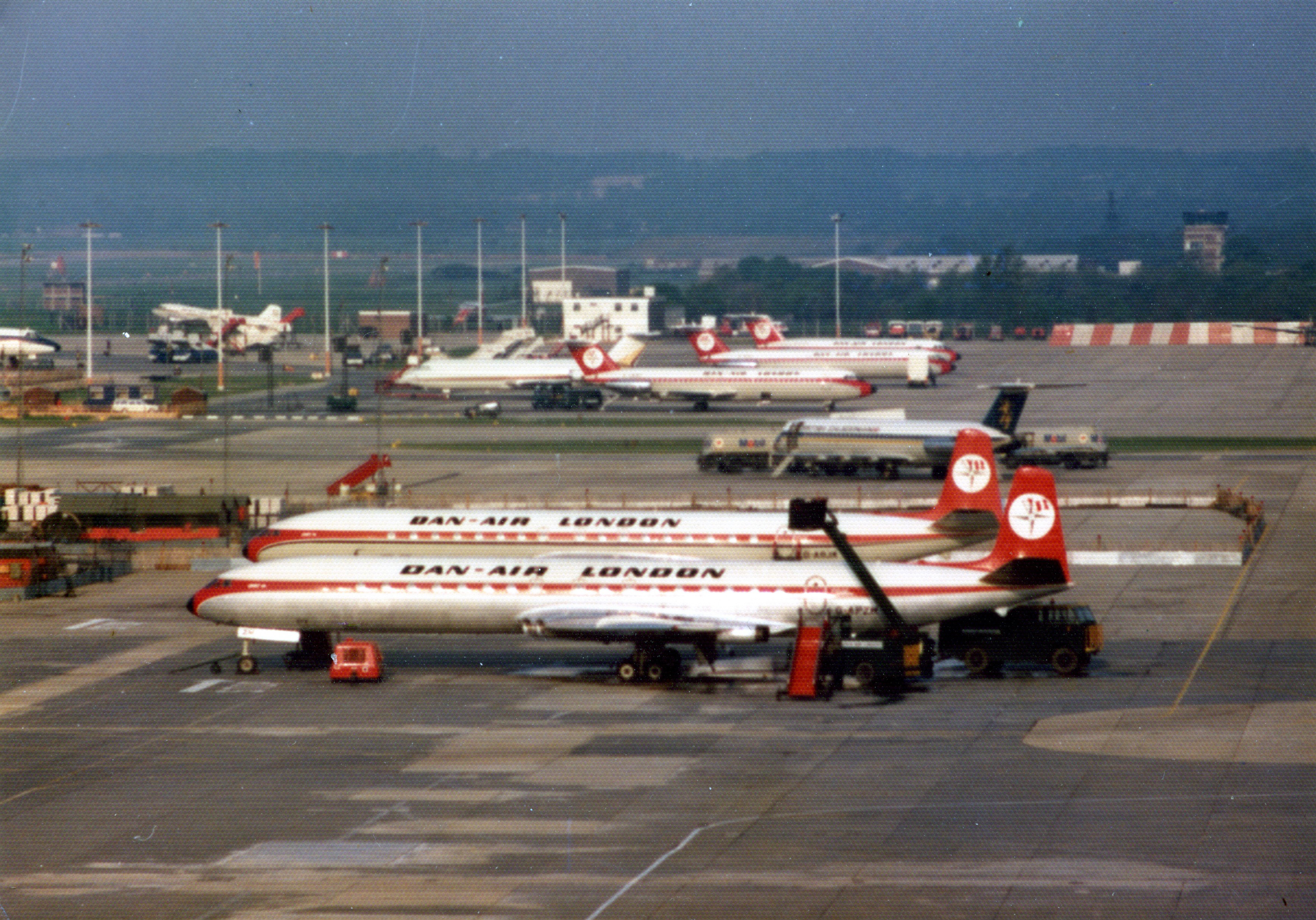
- Dan-Air de Haviland Comets and BAC One-Elevens parked at London-Gatwick in 1976
| IATA | ICAO | Call sign |
|---|---|---|
| DA | DAN | DAN-AIR |
- Founded: 21 May 1953
- Ceased operations: 27 November 1992 (merged into British Airways)
- Hubs: Berlin–Tegel; London–Gatwick; Manchester
- Focus cities: Newcastle upon Tyne
- Parent company: Davies and Newman
- Headquarters: City of London: Bilbao House (1953–1987); Central London: New City Court (1987–1991); Horley, Surrey: Newman House (1991–1992)
- Key people: Fred Newman (1953–1990); David James (1990–1992)

Dan-Air (legally Dan Air Services Limited) was an airline based in the United Kingdom and a wholly owned subsidiary of London-based shipbroking firm Davies and Newman. It was started in 1953 with a single aircraft. Initially, it operated cargo and passenger charter flights from Southend (1953–1955) and Blackbushe airports (1955–1960) using a variety of piston-engined aircraft before moving to a new base at Gatwick Airport in 1960, followed by expansion into inclusive tour (IT) charter flights and all-year round scheduled services. The introduction of two de Havilland Comet series 4 jet aircraft in 1966 made Dan-Air the second British independent airline after British United Airways to begin sustained jet operations.

The early 1970s saw the acquisition of a pair of Boeing 707 long-haul jets for use on affinity group and Advance Booking Charter flights to Canada and the United States. In 1973, Dan-Air became the first British airline to operate the Boeing 727 trijet. By the mid-1970s, it had become Britain's largest independent airline, both in terms of passengers carried and fleet size, operating the country's largest charter fleet. This was also the time a Dan-Air staff member, Yvonne Pope Sintes became Britain's and Europe's first female jet captain.

By the early 1980s, the airline had also become the leading operator of fixed wing oil industry support flights, operating a fleet of 13 Hawker Siddeley 748 turboprops between bases on the Scottish mainland and the Shetland Islands under contract to firms involved in North Sea oil exploration. In 1983, Dan-Air was the first airline to launch commercial operations with British Aerospace 146 regional jet. The acquisition of an Airbus A300 in 1986 marked Dan-Air's widebody debut and the late 1980s saw a major expansion of their scheduled activities, including the introduction of two-class services on trunk routes. Passenger numbers peaked in 1989 at 6.2 million (1.8 million on scheduled services).

Lack of vertical integration with a tour operator, and an inefficient fleet mix dominated by ageing Boeing 727s and BAC One-Elevens made Dan-Air uncompetitive, resulting in increasing marginalisation and growing financial difficulties as well as a change in senior management and strategy by the early 1990s. Following unsuccessful attempts to merge Dan-Air with a competitor, the ailing airline was sold to British Airways in 1992 for the nominal sum of £1.

== History ==
=== Beginning ===
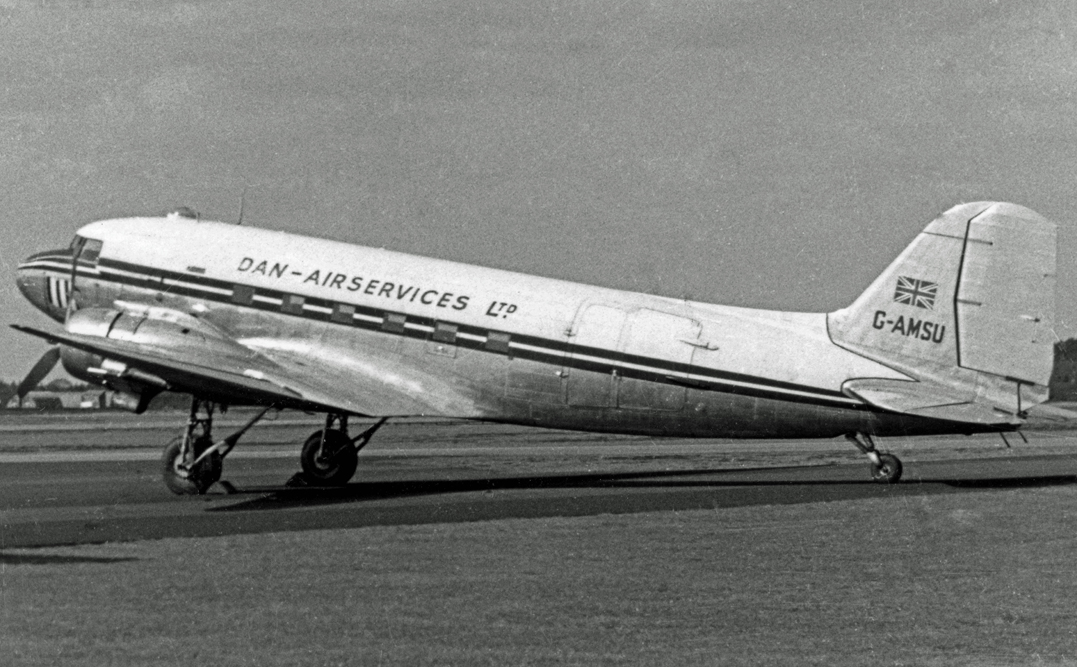
The airline's first aircraft G-AMSU, a Douglas C-47B Dakota 4 at Blackbushe Airport in 1955 wearing the initial Dan-Air Services titles

Dan-Air's parent Davies and Newman had been engaged in shipbroking in the City of London since 1922. It subsequently diversified into air charter broking from an office at London's Baltic Mercantile and Shipping Exchange. Amongst Davies and Newman's clients for whom it acted as an air charter broker was a small airline called Meredith Air Transport. Meredith was formed in 1952 as a small ad hoc charter operator and flew a single Douglas DC-3 out of Southend Airport, where it also had its head office. When Meredith's only aircraft suffered a mishap while taking off from Jerusalem's Atarot Airport on Christmas Eve 1952 that damaged the aircraft's tailwheel, this caused major disruption to the company's business. As a result, Meredith soon found itself in financial difficulties. Davies and Newman agreed to take a debenture on Meredith's aircraft in return for extending financial assistance. When Meredith's financial problems worsened and the debenture became due for repayment, Davies & Newman took over the aircraft together with a six-month contract to operate a series of charter flights between Southend and West Berlin's Tempelhof Airport that formed part of the second Little Berlin Airlift.

Dan-Air began commercial air services in the UK in May 1953 with the aircraft it had taken over from Meredith Air Transport, a single Douglas DC-3 bearing the registration G-AMSU. The fledgling airline received its air operator's certificate on 23 May 1953.

Dan-Air derived its name from its parent's initials, Davies, And, Newman. The company was incorporated on 21 May 1953 as Dan Air Services Limited, with a capital of £5,000. To emphasise that this was a British rather than a Danish company, the airline's aircraft displayed the suffix "London" with the Dan-Air name on both sides of the fuselage. This convention was followed until a year before Dan-Air's takeover by British Airways, when the "London" suffix was dropped from fuselage titles.

Dan-Air's first commercial service – an ad hoc charter flight from Southend via Manchester to Shannon – occurred in June 1953. Operations initially continued from Meredith's old base at Southend Airport, where Meredith managed Dan-Air's operations for the first six months. (Following the end of Meredith's contract to manage Dan-Air's operations at Southend, Meredith Air Transport changed its name to African Air Safaris on 29 November 1954.)

=== Areas of commercial activity ===
Dan-Air operated inclusive tour (IT) charter flights, regional short-haul scheduled services, transatlantic and other worldwide affinity group/Advanced Booking Charters (ABC flights), oil industry support flights and ad hoc operations including all-cargo services from London Gatwick, other British airports and Tegel Airport in West Berlin.

=== Commercial success ===
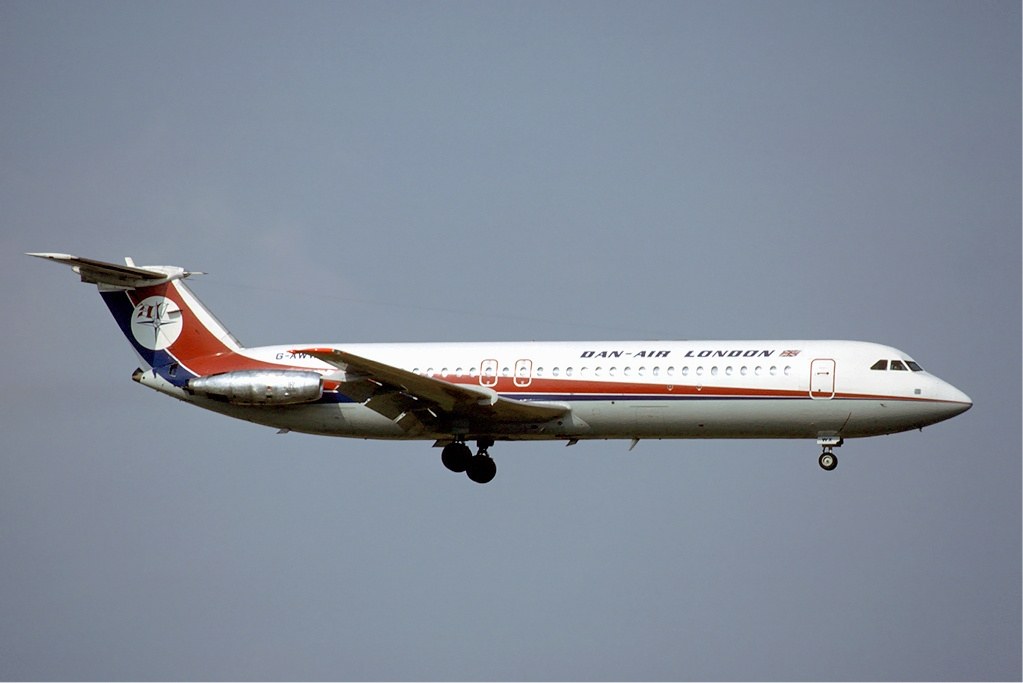
Dan-Air BAC One-Eleven, 1985

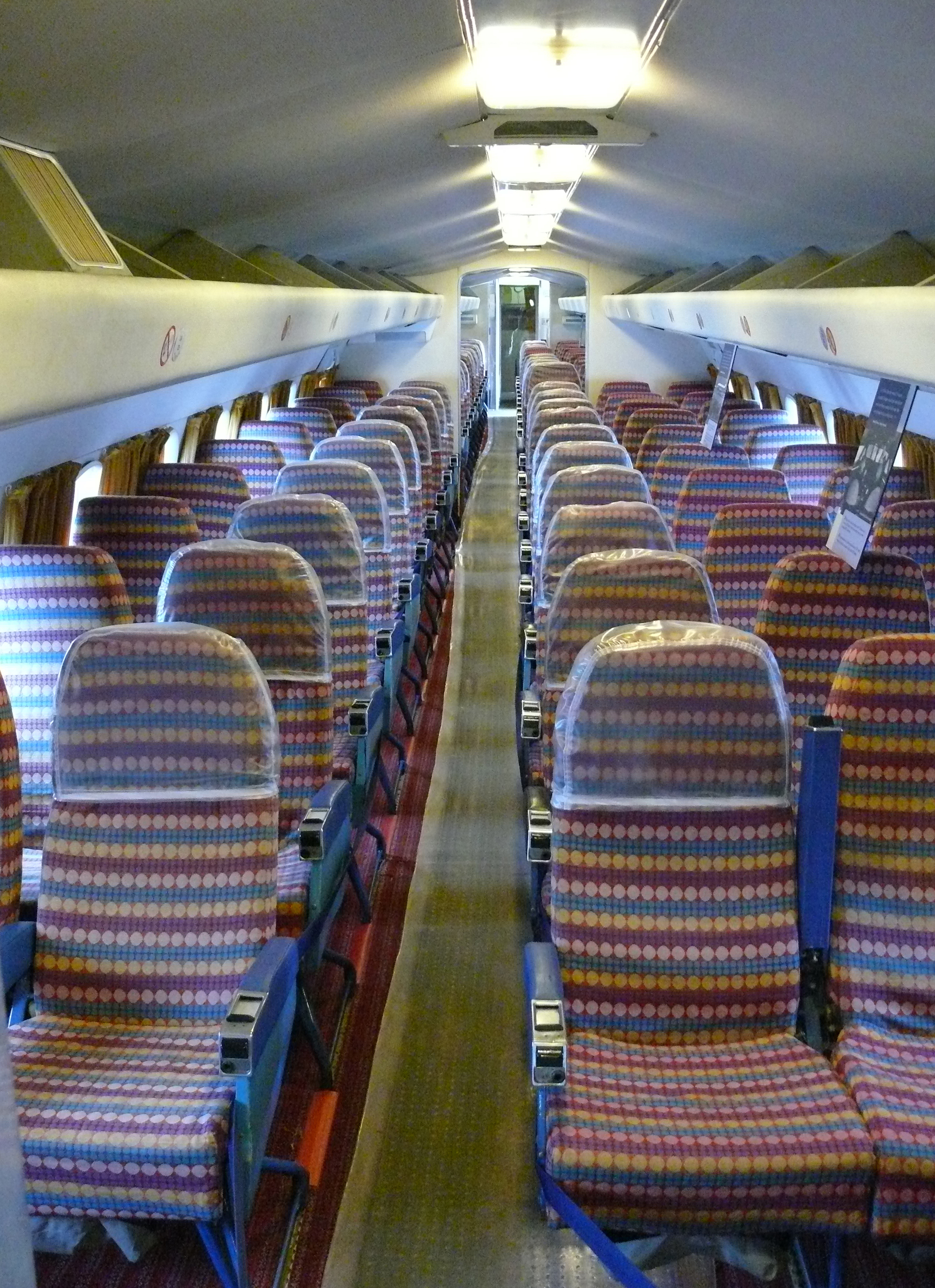
Interior of Dan-Air Comet 4C G-BDIX on display at the National Museum of Flight, East Fortune, Scotland

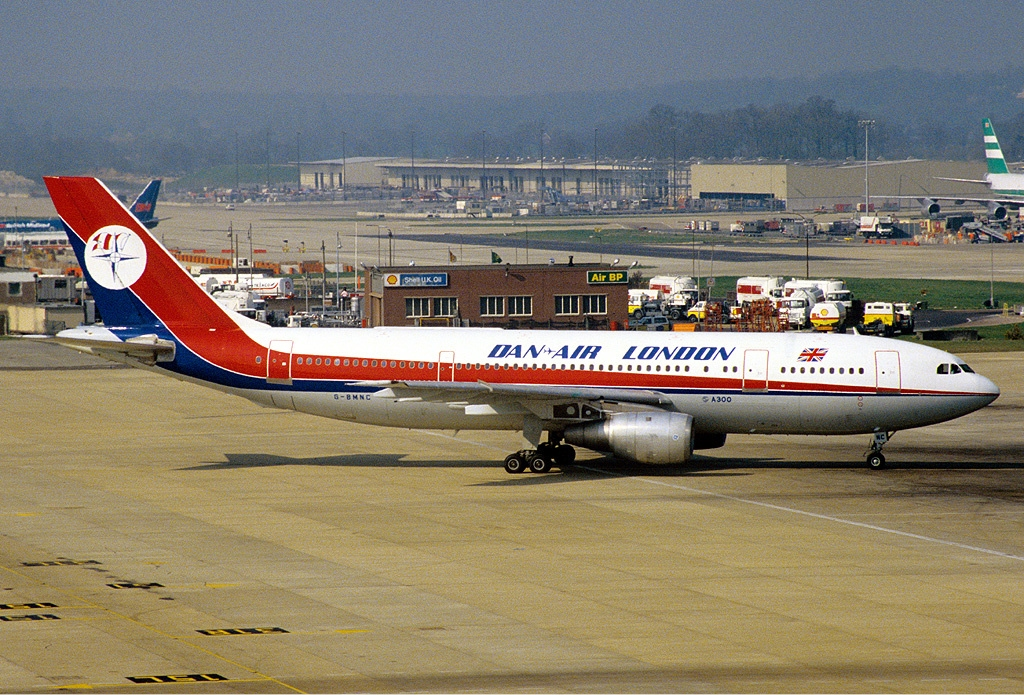
Dan-Air Airbus A300 taxiing towards its stand at London Gatwick, 1990

Dan-Air's acquisition of three ex-RAF Transport Command Avro Yorks in 1954 resulted in establishment of Dan-Air Engineering as a sister company at Lasham, a disused war-time airfield in Hampshire, to service its fleet as well as other operators.

The acquisition of a second DC-3 in 1954 resulted in Dan-Air moving its main operating base from Southend to Blackbushe the following year. The main base transferred to Gatwick in 1960 when Blackbushe closed to commercial airlines.

Dan-Air's arrival at Gatwick in 1960 coincided with the entry into service of three former Butler Air Transport Airspeed Ambassadors, the airline's first pressurised aircraft. This heralded the beginning of a major expansion into the IT charter market, including its first charter programme from Manchester. Horizon Holidays was one of the first tour operators to contract the airline's aircraft. The Ambassador fleet numbered seven aircraft by the mid-1960s and operated the majority of the company's IT flights until Comets and One-Elevens assumed the bulk of these operations towards the end of the decade.

In 1966, Dan-Air introduced its first pair of ex-British Overseas Airways Corporation (BOAC) de Havilland Comet series 4 aircraft, which made it the second British independent airline after British United Airways to start uninterrupted pure jet operations. This marked the beginning of sustained, steady and mostly profitable expansion.

By the end of the 1960s, Dan-Air had become Gatwick's third biggest resident operator after British United Airways and Caledonian Airways.

In October 1970, the US Civil Aeronautics Board granted Dan-Air a foreign carrier permit for a five-year period. This became effective on 5 April 1971 and enabled the airline to operate regular transatlantic affinity group charter flights between Britain and the US. To assist with marketing its transatlantic capacity to affinity group charter organisers in both countries, Dan-Air established a new joint venture named Dan-Air Intercontinental in partnership with CPS Aviation Services as a jointly owned subsidiary. Flights began in late-March 1971 with a Boeing 707-321 that was acquired second-hand from Pan American World Airways (Pan Am). The successful launch of Dan-Air's transatlantic joint venture led to the acquisition of a second 707-321 from Pan Am in 1972, and both aircraft continued to be primarily employed on transatlantic charter flights between Britain, Canada and the US until their retirement in 1978.

Dan-Air's parent, Davies and Newman Holdings, became a publicly listed company when it was floated on the London Stock Exchange in late 1971. The group was capitalised at £5 million at its stock market debut. This provided the funds to expand its charter business, build a network of regional scheduled services between secondary airports across Europe (with particular emphasis on the United Kingdom and Ireland), enter the transatlantic affinity group/ABC market and establish itself as leading fixed wing operator of oil industry support flights. It let the airline expand its fleet, leading to introduction of the One-Eleven, Boeing 707, Hawker Siddeley 748, Boeing 727,Boeing 737, BAe 146 and, eventually, the Airbus A300. Most were acquired second-hand.

In 1972, Dan-Air co-founded Gatwick Handling, a Gatwick-based handling agent, with Laker Airways. Each owned 50% at its inception.

By the mid-1970s, Dan-Air had become the second biggest resident operator at Gatwick after British Caledonian. From then on, it operated the largest of the UK independent airlines' fleets as well as Britain's largest charter fleet. Operating a large fleet comprising aircraft of various sizes gave the airline unrivalled flexibility among European charter carriers to meet the requirements of different tour operators. In the UK, Dan-Air was second only to British Airways in fleet size. For most of this period, Dan-Air had more than 50 aircraft, employed about 3,000 and by the end of the 1980s carried 6 million passengers annually, almost one-third on scheduled services.

Dan-Air marked the 1980s with a corporate makeover. The first stage entailed a new fleet-wide livery. One Boeing 727-100, the airline's first pair of stretched Boeing 727-200 Advanced and its first Boeing 737 were first to appear in the new livery. The second stage gave the fleet widebody look interiors as each aircraft underwent maintenance. The final stage changed stationery, ticket wallets, timetable covers, airport signs and baggage tags as well as its logo in advertisements and public relations campaigns.

By the time British Airways took over British Caledonian, Dan-Air had become Gatwick's second-largest slot holder, accounting for 16% of slots. Dan-Air provided the chairman of the Gatwick Scheduling Committee while British Caledonian, Gatwick's largest slot holder, provided the [slot] co-ordinator.

==== Expansion overseas ====
Dan-Air's first overseas expansion occurred during the Cold War in 1968 when Frank Tapling, the sales director, visited German tour operators to increase utilisation of the growing Comet fleet and take advantage of all airlines other than those headquartered in the US, the UK, and France being banned from West Berlin. Operating out of West Berlin let Dan-Air redeploy capacity left surplus in the UK due to sterling's devaluation and exchange controls which limited passengers to £50 a trip, and to obtain better rates than in the oversupplied UK charter market. The Comets' low acquisition costs also enabled Dan-Air to offer German tour operators with flying programmes from West Berlin keener rates than other Allied charter carriers – chiefly fellow British independent Laker Airways and US airline Modern Air.

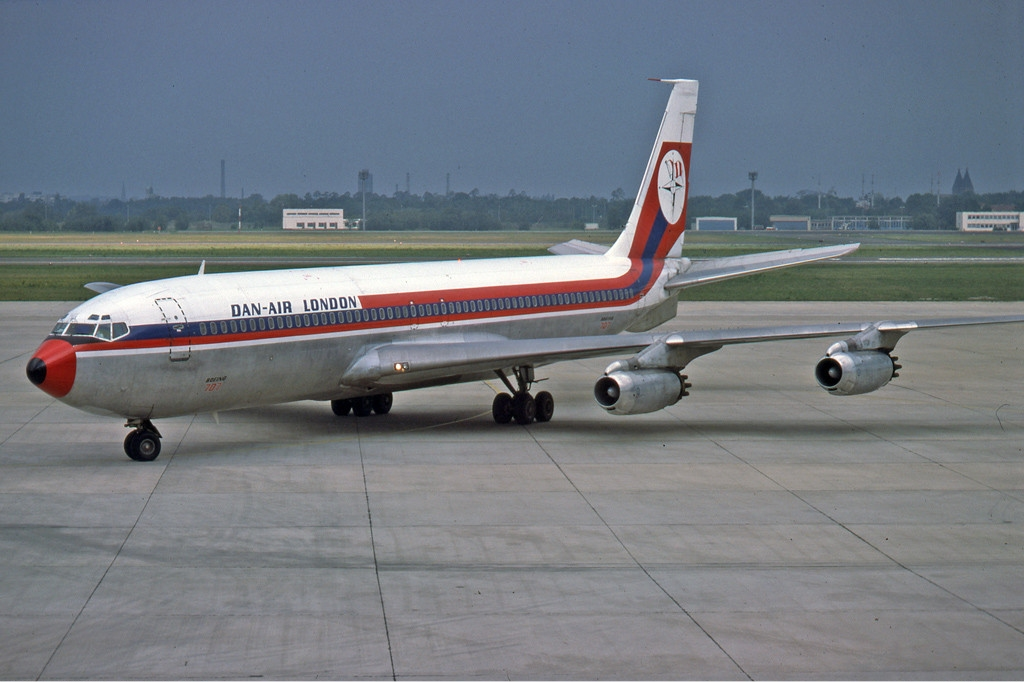
Dan-Air operated this ex-Pan Am Boeing 707-321 out of Berlin Tegel Airport during winter 1974–75. It is seen here at Tegel in 1978

31 March 1968 marked the beginning of Dan-Air's association with Tegel which lasted 25 years. On that day, a Comet 4 left the airport for Málaga, the first of almost 300 IT flights under contract to West German tour operator Neckermann und Reisen. Dan-Air established its first overseas base at Tegel in 1969. Up to five aircraft were stationed there for over two decades. These initially comprised Comets, One-Elevens, and Boeing 707s and 727s. They were later replaced with Boeing 737s, Hawker Siddeley 748s, and BAe 146s. The Berlin fleet operated charters under contract to tour operators as well as scheduled services to Amsterdam and Saarbrücken. Gatwick aircraft and crew operated most regular charter flights as well as all scheduled services linking Berlin with Gatwick. At its peak during the late 1970s and early 1980s, Berlin was staffed by 170, mainly local, employees and handled more than 300,000 passengers annually.

Dan-Air's Berlin 727s had additional fuselage fuel tanks to fly non-stop to the Canary Islands with a full payload. At 2,200 miles (3,500 km) the distance between Berlin and Las Palmas was greater than the shortest transatlantic crossing between Shannon in western Ireland and Gander in eastern Canada. The five-hour flight was the limit of the 727's economically viable non-stop range. The Berlin 727-100s' enhanced fuel capacity also meant that these aircraft had up to 20 fewer seats compared with their UK counterparts – 131 vs. 151 – to take full advantage of the resulting range increase. This in turn permitted Dan-Air to offer its German charter passengers an improved seat pitch, in line with German tour operators' requirement for a more comfortable seating arrangement as opposed to the then prevailing "high-density" configurations on most UK charter aircraft.

Dan-Air operated the first commercial flight to Tegel's new terminal building on 1 November 1974 at 6am with a One-Eleven inbound from Tenerife.

==== Scheduled service developments ====
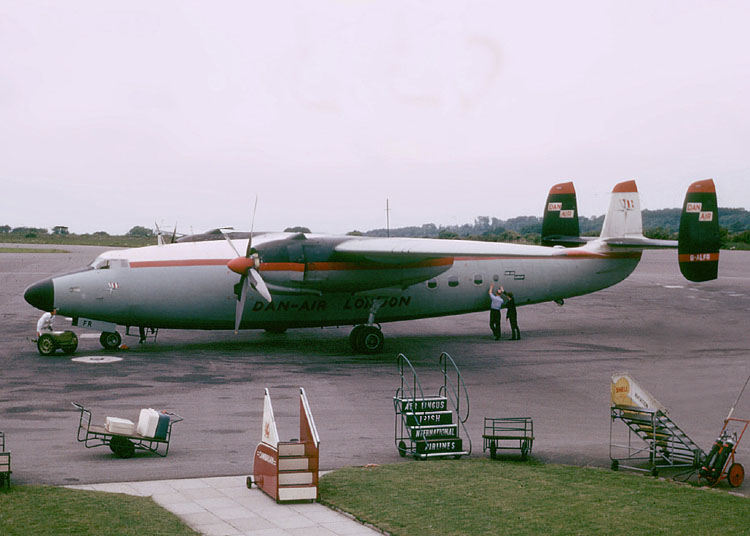
Dan-Air Airspeed AS 57 Ambassador at Bristol Airport in 1965.

Dan-Air operated its first seasonal scheduled service during summer 1956 between Blackbushe and Jersey. It operated its first year-round scheduled service in 1960, linking Bristol and Cardiff with Liverpool. That service was inaugurated with a pair of de Havilland Doves. Subsequent changes included extending the service from Bristol to Plymouth, and replacing Doves with larger Herons and DC-3s. The resulting route pattern became the foundation of the Link City network. This linked South West England with the Northeast via stops at the commercial centres of the Midlands and the Northwest. DC-3s continued plying all domestic Link City scheduled routes for the first ten years.

The first international scheduled route was launched in 1960, linking Bristol and Cardiff with Basel. Further international scheduled services from Liverpool to Rotterdam, Bristol to Basel via Bournemouth as well as from Bristol and Gatwick to Ostend followed during the early 1960s. These were operated with DC-3s and Airspeed Ambassadors.

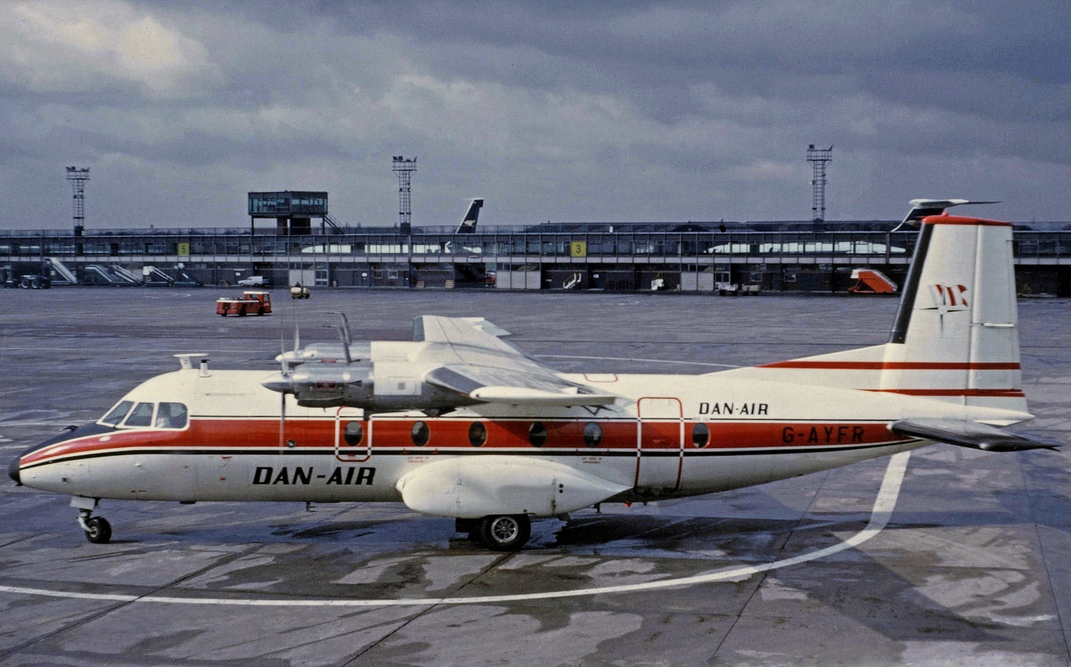
Dan-Air operated this Nord 262 on its scheduled UK internal Link City routes during 1970–1972. The aircraft is seen here at Manchester Airport in 1971.

Dan-Air's acquisition of Scottish Airlines and Skyways International in 1961 and 1972 enlarged the scheduled operation. The former brought a passenger-configured DC-3 and a seasonal route linking Prestwick with the Isle of Man. The latter resulted in four additional HS 748s and year-round services linking Bournemouth with Jersey and Guernsey, as well as seasonal flights linking Gatwick with Clermont-Ferrand and Montpellier. These aircraft let the airline expand Link City by adding Bournemouth and reorganising the structure by introducing Bournemouth–Birmingham–Liverpool/Manchester–Newcastle and Luton–Leeds Bradford–Glasgow, in April 1972. Schedules offered same-day-returns Monday to Friday. These ex-Skyways HS 748s enabled Dan-Air to open a seasonal Gatwick–Bern route in June 1972, the first direct scheduled air link between the UK and the Swiss capital. The acquisition resulted in the HS 748 becoming the main scheduled aircraft for the next ten years. As a consequence, 748s replaced the Nord 262 Dan-Air had acquired from Air Ceylon in 1970 as a DC-3 replacement to operate Bristol–Cardiff–Liverpool–Newcastle. In addition, Skyways brought a scheduled route linking Ashford (Lympne) Airport in Kent with Beauvais. This formed part of a London–Paris coach-air service, which Skyways had pioneered in 1955 with DC-3s. Dan-Air continued this service until the early 1980s. When Ashford closed in 1974, services moved to Lydd. Seven-four-eights, One-Elevens and Vickers Viscounts leased from other operators operated these services.

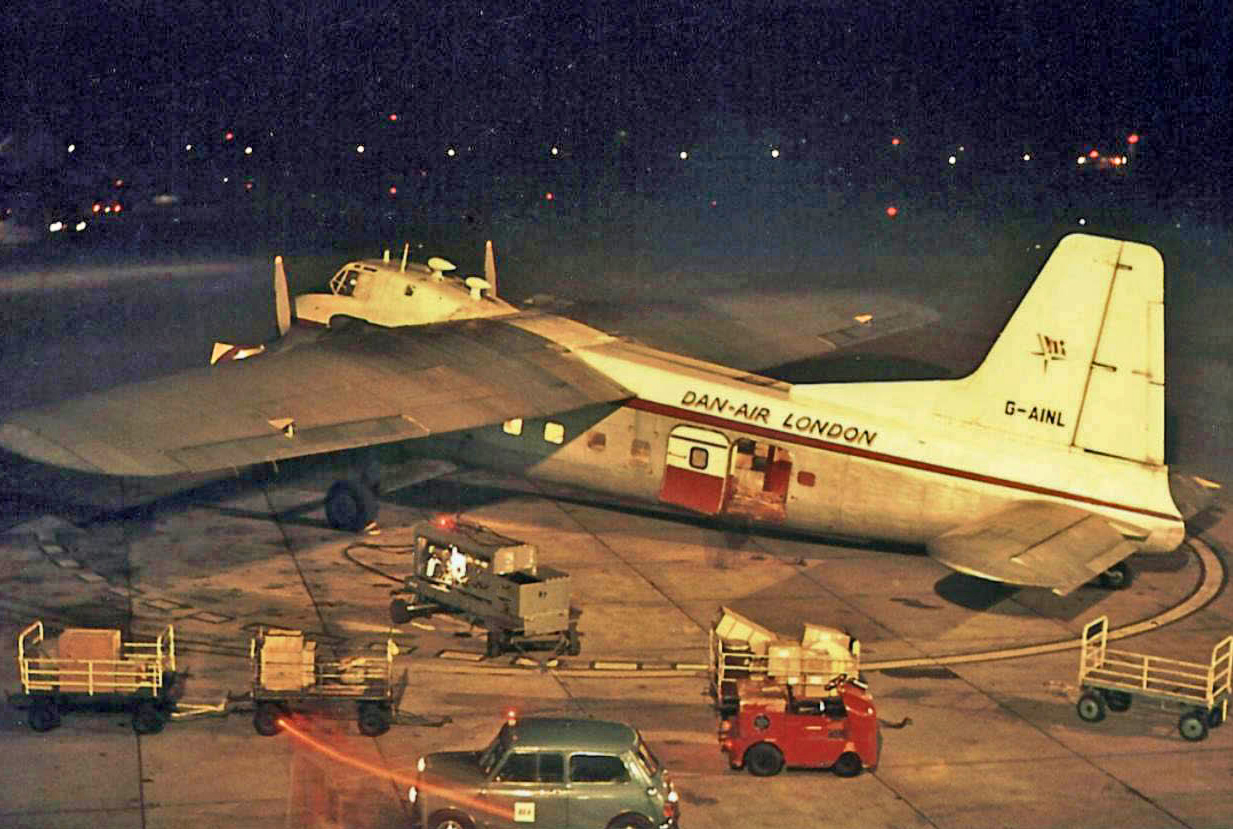
Dan-Air Bristol Freighter 31 operating a cargo flight at Manchester Airport in 1964.

In 1973, Dan-Air added Teesside as a stop to Link City and inaugurated scheduled services between Teesside and Amsterdam.

In 1974, Dan-Air began replacing the 748 with Comets and One-Elevens on its seasonal, scheduled services between Gatwick, Clermont-Ferrand and Montpellier, as well as on its year-round Luton–Leeds–Glasgow schedule, the first time the airline had used jets on scheduled services. The turboprop capacity released enabled re-introduction of scheduled services between Bristol, Cardiff and Amsterdam, as well as the launch of direct scheduled services between Newcastle and the Isle of Man. During April that year, Dan-Air launched a year-round, same-day-return Gatwick–Newcastle jet schedule, the airline's first UK mainland domestic feeder route from Gatwick. This twice-daily service, promoted with British Caledonian, initially utilised Comet 4Bs. From November 1974, BAC One-Eleven 300/400s replaced Comets on one of the rotations. In May 1974, Dan-Air launched a twice-daily Gatwick–Ostend HS 748 service in conjunction with Sabena. One of the two daily round-trips was operated under Sabena flight numbers.

In 1975, Dan-Air commenced a year-round scheduled service between Newcastle and Bergen, as well as two new, seasonal scheduled routes linking the Isle of Man with Aberdeen and Gatwick. The latter was the first non-stop scheduled air service between Gatwick and the Isle of Man. Nineteen-seventy-five was also the year the airline converted its seasonal Gatwick–Bern scheduled service into a year-round operation. During that year, the company extended its seasonal scheduled service between Gatwick and Clermont-Ferrand to Perpignan, and introduced One-Eleven jets on its seasonal, Gatwick–Jersey schedule. Nineteen seventy-five furthermore saw the acquisition of two former Zambia Airways One-Eleven 200s, the first time the firm had acquired jets to be exclusively operated on scheduled services. One aircraft was based at Gatwick, the other at Newcastle. Moreover, 1975 was the year Manchester became the sole stop in the Northwest on Link City.

In 1976 Dan-Air commenced a year-round scheduled service between Newcastle and Stavanger. In 1977, Dan-Air launched a scheduled route from Gatwick to Strasbourg. 1978, Dan-Air's silver jubilee, saw the launch of a scheduled service linking Gatwick with Bergen.

In November 1979, Dan-Air replaced British Airways as scheduled carrier between Gatwick and Aberdeen, a feeder route for the oil industry. 1979 also saw the launch of a Gatwick–Toulouse scheduled service.

In April 1980, Dan-Air took over British Airways's loss-making regional services from Bristol, Cardiff and Newcastle to Belfast and Dublin, as well as from Bristol and Cardiff to Jersey, Guernsey and Paris Charles de Gaulle, and from Leeds/Bradford to Guernsey.

1981 saw Dan-Air launch a scheduled route linking Gatwick with Cork, its first scheduled service from Gatwick to Ireland, as well as a new, seasonal scheduled service linking Newcastle with Jersey and a new, year-round combined Gatwick–Newcastle–Aberdeen weekend schedule. During that year, the airline inaugurated scheduled services between Berlin and Amsterdam Schiphol, the company's first scheduled route from Berlin as well as its first scheduled route not to touch the UK. Furthermore, in November, Dan-Air withdrew its application to the CAA to take over British Airways's Highland and Islands scheduled operation.

During 1981 and 1982, Dan-Air leased three HS 748s to British Airways to supplement the latter's 748 fleet on Scottish internal routes.

The partial liberalisation of the Anglo-Irish bilateral agreement during the early 1980s enabled Dan-Air to commence scheduled operations on Gatwick–Dublin in 1982. As the recession began to bite and passengers for Link City dwindled, the company contracted them to regional airlines operating smaller aircraft. Nineteen eighty-two saw Metropolitan Airways, a subsidiary of Alderney Air Ferries (Holdings), take over Dan-Air's Bournemouth–Cardiff/Birmingham–Manchester–Newcastle schedule.

In March 1983, Dan-Air took over British Airways's loss-making Heathrow–Inverness route. This was the first time the airline had operated a scheduled service out of Heathrow. In May 1983, the company flew the world's inaugural BAe 146 scheduled service between Gatwick and Bern, the first commercial jet service into the small airport serving the Swiss capital. The same year, the company started scheduled Gatwick–Zürich flights, the second time it had launched daily scheduled services on a European trunk route. In November 1983, Dan-Air joined Travicom, the computer reservation system (CRS) used at the time by travel agents in the UK.

In January 1984, Dan-Air took over Touraine Air Transport's scheduled internal German operation between Berlin and Saarbrücken, the first time the airline had operated a scheduled route entirely within another country. That year also saw Dan-Air assume British Midland's scheduled route between Gatwick and Belfast International Airport as well as launch a scheduled Manchester–Zürich service. In May 1984, Dan-Air began stationing an aircraft in Jersey, increasing the frequency of its scheduled service to Gatwick and converting it into a year-round operation. In addition, 1984 was the year Metropolitan took over Dan-Air's remaining Link City schedules between Bristol, Cardiff, Leeds and Glasgow.

In 1985, Dan-Air inaugurated a seasonal scheduled route linking Gatwick with Innsbruck, operated with a BAe 146. Innsbruck was the airline's first scheduled destination in Austria, which began receiving commercial jetliners on a scheduled basis for the first time. Nineteen eighty-five was also the year Dan-Air launched a year-round Manchester–Newcastle–Oslo scheduled route, the company's first scheduled services to the Norwegian capital.

In 1986, Dan-Air launched a year-round non-stop Manchester–Amsterdam scheduled service.

In 1987, Dan-Air began a scheduled service between Gatwick and Lisbon, its first scheduled service on a main trunk route between the UK and the Iberian Peninsula. The same year, the airline joined the International Air Transport Association (IATA) as a Trade Association member.

Following British Airways's takeover of British Caledonian in December 1987, Dan-Air's scheduled services transferred to Texas Air's SystemOne CRS.

In 1988, Dan-Air commenced scheduled services between Gatwick and Madrid. Towards the end of that year, the airline also assumed the former British Caledonian routes from Gatwick to Paris Charles de Gaulle, Manchester, Aberdeen, and Nice, gaining access to some of Gatwick's most important feeder routes, as well as some of the densest and most lucrative short-haul European trunk routes.

At the start of the 1988–1989 winter timetable, Dan-Air became a two-class scheduled airline when, under the stewardship of Vic Sheppard, it introduced its Class Elite business class between Gatwick and Paris and between Gatwick and Nice on three refurbished One-Eleven 500s. Sheppard had joined Dan-Air from British Caledonian.

In 1989, Dan-Air introduced Class Elite on all scheduled flights from Gatwick to Dublin, Zürich, Lisbon, Madrid, and Toulouse.

In 1990, Dan-Air introduced year-round two-class scheduled services from Gatwick to Tegel and Vienna. Gatwick–Tegel was Dan-Air's first scheduled link between its main UK base and its long-established overseas base. At the start of the 1990–1991 winter timetable, the firm replaced one of the two Berlin HS 748 turboprops with larger BAe 146 jets on Berlin–Amsterdam and introduced direct scheduled services linking Berlin with Manchester and Newcastle via Amsterdam. In addition, the company took over the Gatwick–Amsterdam feeder route from British Airways.

Following Air Europe's demise at the end of the first week of March 1991, Dan-Air began assuming most of the failed carrier's scheduled routes from Gatwick, starting with Gatwick–Brussels and Gatwick–Oslo. Dan-Air's rival's collapse also enabled it to increase frequencies and introduce larger aircraft on the busy Gatwick – Charles de Gaulle and Gatwick–Manchester routes. At the start of the 1991–1992 winter timetable, Dan-Air increased the frequency of its Gatwick – Charles de Gaulle Airport services to nine return flights per day and Gatwick–Manchester to eight daily returns. The airline replaced BAC One-Eleven 500s with Boeing 737s on both routes. From then on, Dan-Air carried more scheduled passengers than British Caledonian had ever carried in one year throughout its existence.

The expansion of Dan-Air's scheduled operation at Gatwick continued throughout 1992, resulting in the resumption of former Air Europe routes to Stockholm Arlanda in February and Rome Fiumicino in April. In addition, Dan-Air launched Gatwick–Athens in March and re-launched Gatwick–Barcelona in May. During that period, Dan-Air became Gatwick's largest resident, short-haul scheduled operator controlling 18% of all slots, and 21% of all morning peak time slots between 8am and 9am.

In addition to scheduled services on its own account, Dan-Air was also contracted by other airlines to operate scheduled passenger and cargo services.

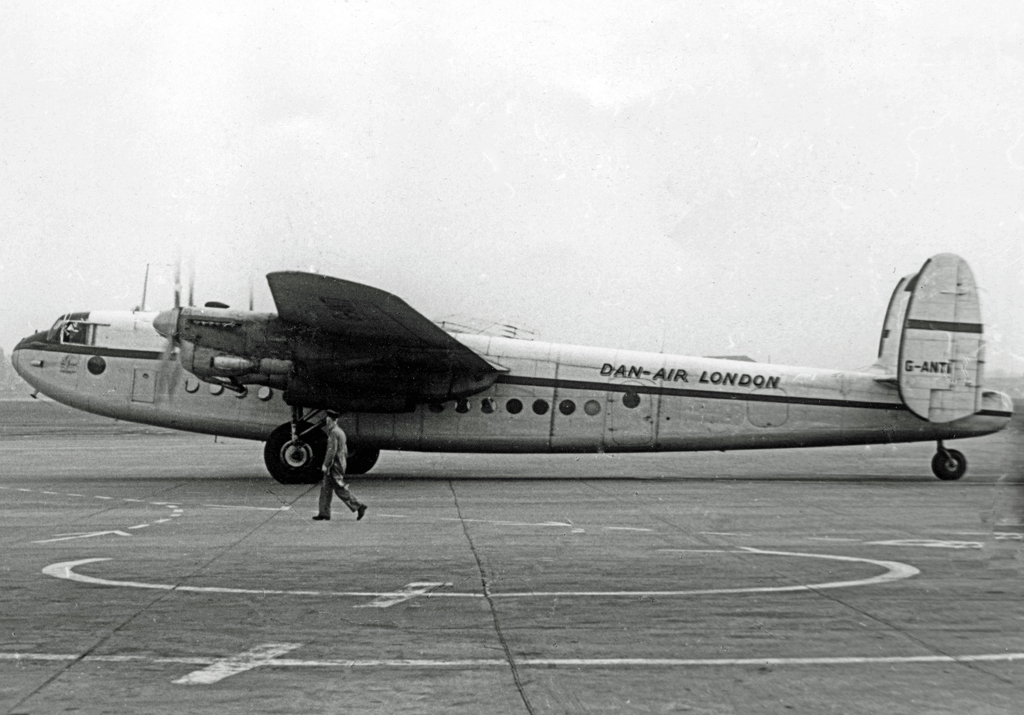
Dan-Air Avro York freighter at Manchester Airport in 1960, one of several examples operated between July 1954 and April 1964.

In 1959, British European Airways (BEA) awarded Dan-Air a two-year contract to operate its six-times weekly scheduled freight service between Heathrow, Manchester and Glasgow's old Renfrew Airport using Avro York freighters. From 1960, BEA awarded Dan-Air additional contracts to operate its freight services from Heathrow to other destinations in the UK and Continental Europe. The airline eventually replaced the DC-3s, which it had used to operate these latter services, with Avro Yorks.

For a couple of months starting in October 1968, Kuwait Airways contracted its entire scheduled operation to Dan-Air, who supplied flight deck crews to man Comets while their own pilots underwent conversion training on the Boeing 707 in the US.

During the 1970s, IAS Cargo Airlines sub-contracted Dan-Air to operate Zambia Airways's weekly scheduled Heathrow–Lusaka all-cargo service with a small fleet of 707 freighters in hybrid Dan-Air/IAS Cargo Airlines colours.

==== Milestones ====
Dan-Air claimed to be the first airline to transport a live dolphin. It also laid claim to be the first to introduce disposable catering equipment aboard its aircraft in 1969.

Dan-Air ordered its first new aircraft in 1969, a single Handley Page Jetstream to replace the DC-3 assigned to Link City. However, the order lapsed when Handley Page went into liquidation in 1970. Despite the negotiations being at an advanced stage, with the manufacturer's future in doubt, it was difficult to finance the purchase and the order could not be completed.

Dan-Air ran its first transatlantic charter flight in October 1969 from Gatwick to Trinidad with a Comet.

Dan-Air operated a dozen 707 round-the-world charters for German tour operators during the mid-1970s.

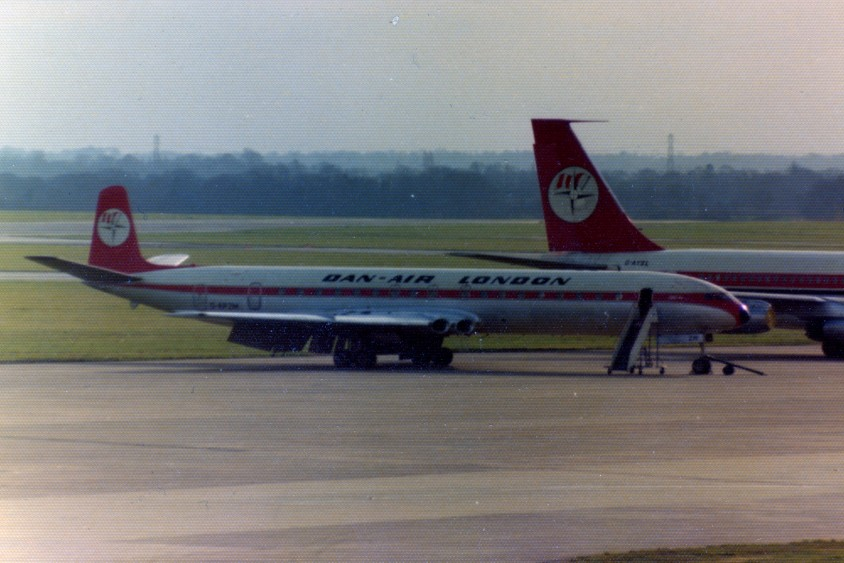
de Havilland Comet next to a Boeing 707 at Manchester Airport in 1976.

Dan-Air was one of the first UK airlines to employ female pilots, with five among 550 during 1978. It was also the first UK airline to have a female pilot in command of jet aircraft. Yvonne Sintes, who had started her career as an airline pilot with Morton Air Services in 1965, joined Dan-Air as a Bristol-based DC-3 first officer in 1969. She gained her command as a captain on the HS 748 fleet before becoming a One-Eleven captain in 1975. Sintes flew One-Elevens and Comets until her retirement in 1980.

During its 39-year history, Dan-Air passed several important passenger number milestones. In 1960, Dan-Air carried 100,000 passengers. It carried 500,000 passengers in one year for the first time in 1969. 1971 saw more than 1 million passengers. 1973 was the first year the company carried more than 2 million. 1977 was the first time with more than 3 million. Four million was reached the following year. It took until 1985 to reach 5 million. In 1989, over 6 million flew with Dan-Air, the highest number ever. 1984 was the year Dan-Air carried more than 1 million scheduled passengers for the first time. Between 1966 and 1980, Dan-Air's 38-strong, active Comet fleet carried 8 million passengers.

=== Financial issues ===
1989 marked a watershed – it was the first year since the era prior to the decision to introduce jets in the mid-1960s, and the only time apart from a blip in 1981–1982, when the company lost money over a whole 12-month period. The loss of £3 million was in contrast to the profit of £10 million made the year before. Like most charter-focused operators, Dan-Air used to make a loss during the winter because of the seasonal nature of its business. However, this was compensated by the profit it made during the summer, giving a modest profit for the entire financial period. The financial position deteriorated during the early 1990s. It lost £35 million in 1991, its last complete 12-month period, and £24 million during the last six months of its existence until October 1992.

=== Causes of decline ===
Among the reasons for Dan-Air's decline was the lack of vertical integration with a UK tour operator. Dan-Air was the last major independent provider of charter airline seats to numerous large, medium-sized, and small tour companies in the UK and overseas at a time when most UK tour firms had set up their own airlines. These then competed with Dan-Air for the bulk of those operators' business leading to a decline in rates. This resulted in a decline in Dan-Air's importance as a business partner for these tour operators reducing its status from main to marginal provider.

Another reason was that its fleet contained too many different, incompatible aircraft types. Some of these aircraft were older and less efficient than those operated by competitors such as Air Europe. Consequently, the Dan-Air fleet was costlier to operate and maintain. The Boeing 727s, which Dan-Air continued to acquire throughout the 1980s, including some on unfavourable leases, proved a financial millstone.

Dan-Air's decision to embark on a major expansion into scheduled services from Gatwick at a time when the UK economy was still mired in the early 1990s recession made the financial position worse. The economic conditions in the UK meant that actual revenues fell short of budget in Dan-Air's 1991–1995 business plan, which aimed at sustained profitability by 1995 with a £42 million profit. This meant an injection of £49 million of additional working capital into Dan-Air's parent company from a successful share issue in 1990 was insufficient to fund the airline's needs. The funds raised through new shares were insufficient to standardise Dan-Air's fleet on the Boeing 737 300/400 series and the Avro RJ115 (marketed but never built). The funds were also insufficient to finance transformation from a cheap-and-cheerful charter carrier with a motley collection of poorly performing, "low visibility" regional scheduled routes into a top quality, "high visibility" mainline short-haul scheduled operator plying trunk routes.

Dan-Air's last chairman, David James, said weak marketing and its charter mentality, even after the decision to make high-profile scheduled services the focus of commercial activities, was a reason it failed to achieve results. That meant that instead of making Dan-Air the airline of choice for high-yield business travellers on prime scheduled routes where it had become a major force in the wake of the demise of British Caledonian and Air Europe – such as Gatwick to Paris Charles de Gaulle – through carefully targeted marketing and publicity, Dan-Air continued selling the bulk of its scheduled inventory to consolidators and discount travel agencies, in the way it had sold its charter inventory to package tour operators. The airline saw this as risk minimisation to fill seats on scheduled services. However, Dan-Air surrendered control over its scheduled seats to third parties whose sales were volume-driven. This deprived Dan-Air of the opportunity to boost the profitability of its scheduled operation by concentrating on maximising revenues from high-yield travellers.

=== Sale to British Airways ===
Following inconclusive talks with Virgin Atlantic to save Dan-Air in return for an investment of £10 million, the airline was sold to British Airways in 1992. British Airways paid a nominal £1, in return taking on financial commitments of £50 million which included debts of £37 million. For its part, British Airways got 12 of Dan-Air's most modern Boeing 737s, a similar number of short-haul scheduled routes from Gatwick, the Heathrow–Inverness feeder service and about one-fifth of its 2,500 workers. Dan-Air was absorbed into British Airways' Gatwick operation. This came after BA had targeted Dan-Air as a part of their "dirty tricks" strategy by BA staff impersonating Dan-Air staff when contacting their handling agents.

On 27 November 1992, the company's name was changed from Dan Air Services Ltd to British Airways (European Operations at Gatwick) Ltd. This remnant of the former Dan-Air formed the nucleus of what British Airways intended to be a low-cost short-haul feeder for its Gatwick long-haul scheduled services, with the aim of helping to return British Airways' loss-making Gatwick operation to sustained profitability.

== Corporate affairs ==
=== Headquarters ===
From 1953 to 1987, Dan-Air had its headquarters at the City of London in Bilbao House.

== Fleet ==
It operated the world's largest fleet of de Havilland Comets and was the last in the world to operate them. Dan-Air built a 49-strong Comet fleet between 1966 and 1976. It retired the last example in November 1980. Not all of these airframes saw actual airline service; some had been exclusively acquired for spares. The Comets commanded a lower price than comparable second-hand jets. They were relatively unused as many previous operators had replaced them with the larger and more economical Boeing 707 and Douglas DC-8 after only a few years. The airframes had many years of service left and cost a fraction of the similarly sized BAC One-Eleven 500 or Boeing 737-200, which were still scarce second-hand. It allowed the airline to replace most of its piston-engined airliners – such as the Avro York, the Bristol 170 Freighter and the Airspeed AS 57 Ambassador – which had reached or were nearing the end of their lives, relatively cheaply.

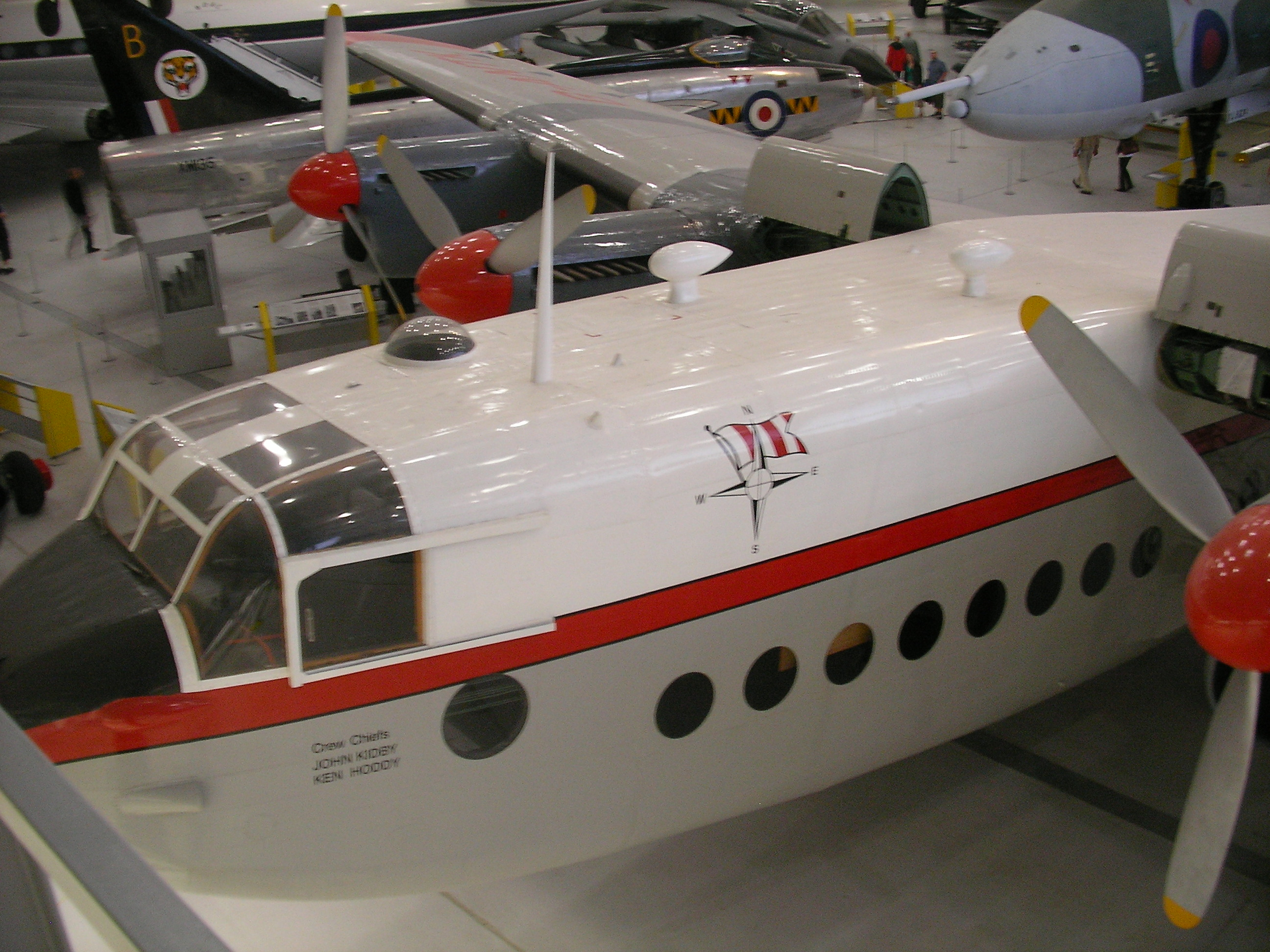
Dan Air Avro York at the Imperial War Museum Duxford.

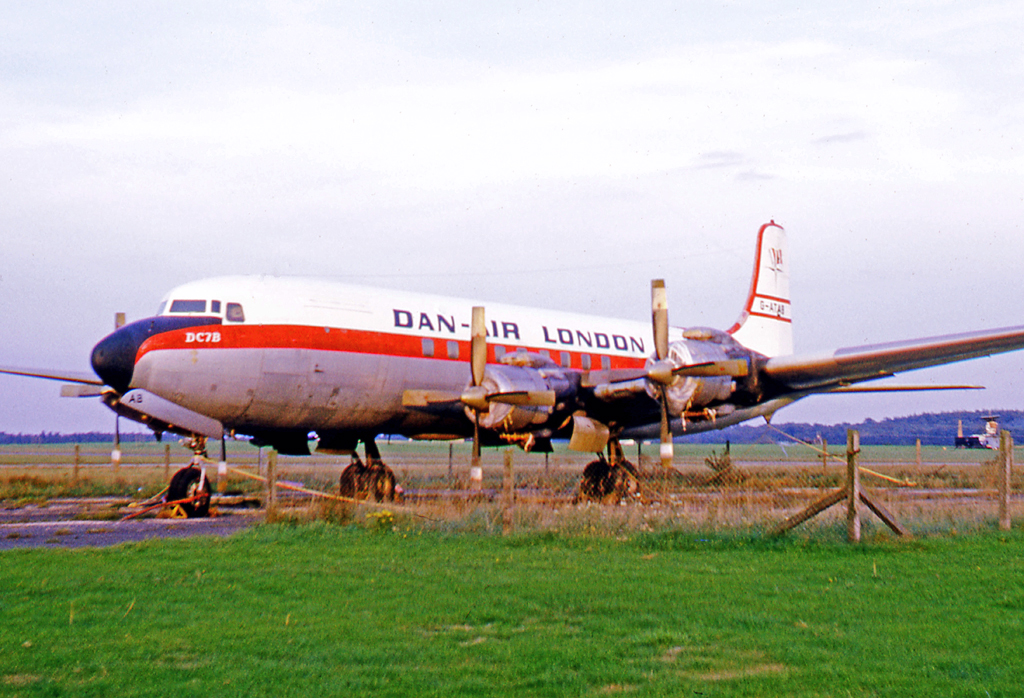
Dan-Air Douglas DC-7BF cargo aircraft in 1969

Dan-Air was the last commercial airline operator of the Ambassador. A small number of this high-winged, twin-engined plane survived in the fleet into the jet era. The last retired in September 1971 after its final Jersey–Gatwick scheduled service.

Dan-Air was the first British operator of the Boeing 727 trijet, at the time the world's best-selling commercial jetliner. The first of three former Japan Airlines Boeing 727-100 series was introduced on 13 April 1973. Among other modifications, the aircraft needed a full stall protection system fitted to meet British civil airworthiness requirements.

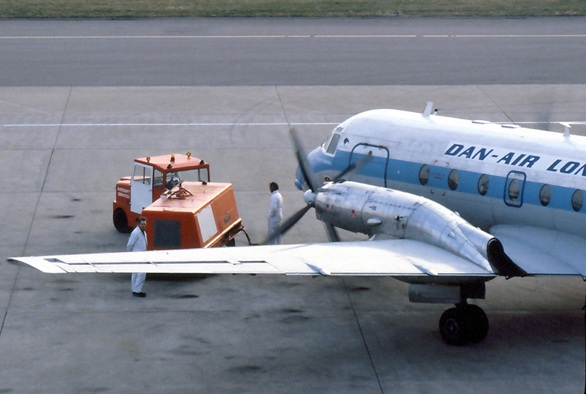
Dan-Air Hawker Siddeley HS 748 at Cardiff Airport in 1980.

Dan-Air's original eight Boeing 727-100s, which entered service between 1973 and 1978, differed from overseas-registered aircraft. Dan-Air's examples featured additional emergency doors each side of the rear fuselage as well as a stall-protection system known as a "stick pusher". The additional exits were needed for having the aircraft certificated for an increased maximum seating capacity of 150. This necessitated satisfying the British Civil Aviation Authority (CAA) requirement that all passengers could leave within 90 seconds using only half the available exits. Stall protection had been introduced in the light of experience with the stalling characteristics of both civil and military British T-tailed jet aircraft, including the loss of a Hawker Siddeley Trident on a test flight over Norfolk when it entered a deep stall. This stall-protection system consisted of a stick pusher, a "nudger" and an independent "shaker" for each pilot. When the aircraft was in danger of stalling it warned the pilots by shaking the control columns as well as correcting attitude and altitude, in an attempt to increase air speed and so avert an irrecoverable deep stall. It was estimated that installing stall-protection cost Dan-Air £100,000 per aircraft and up to £1 million for the entire fleet.

As well as the Comets and 727s, Dan-Air mainly operated BAC One-Elevens and Hawker Siddeley 748s during its most successful period in the 1970s and 1980s.

In May 1983, Dan-Air became the first to put the four-engined BAe 146 regional jetliner into commercial service.

The aircraft types below formed part of Dan-Air's fleet at one point or another in the airline's 39-year history:

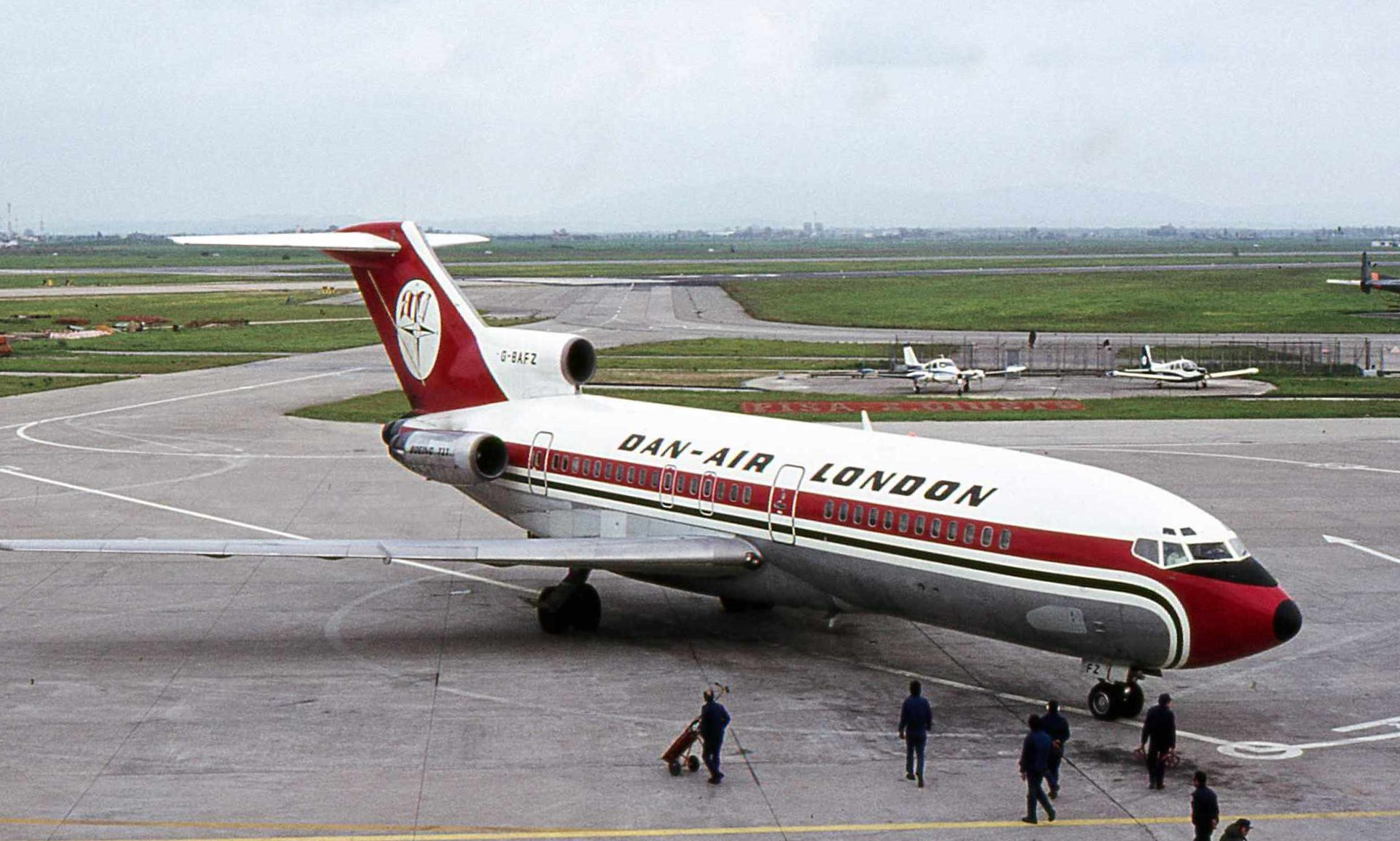
A Dan-Air Boeing 727-100 in 1974

- Airbus A300 B4
- Airspeed Ambassador
- Avro York
- BAC One-Eleven 200/300/400/500 series
- BAe 146-100/300
- Boeing 707-320/320C
- Boeing 727-100/200 Advanced
- Boeing 737-200/200 Advanced/300/400
- Bristol Freighter
- de Havilland Comet series 4/4B/4C
- de Havilland Dove
- de Havilland Heron
- Douglas DC-3
- Douglas DC-4
- Douglas DC-7
- Handley Page Dart Herald
- Hawker Siddeley 748 series 1/2
- Nord 262
- Piper Apache
- Vickers Viscount series 700/800.

== Accidents and incidents ==
=== Fatal accidents ===
Throughout Dan-Air's 39 years, the airline suffered seven accidents involving the loss of aircraft and lives, three of which killed fare-paying passengers. These accidents were :

- 1958 Dan-Air Avro York crash: an Avro York crashed on 25 May 1958 while making a forced landing at Gurgaon, Haryana, India, after an engine had caught fire on an all-cargo flight from Karachi to Delhi. The radio operator was the sole survivor of the five occupants.
- A Piper PA-23 Apache 160 (G-ATFZ) operating a positioning/crew flight from Gatwick via Lasham to Bristol below cloud in poor weather crashed on 1 September 1966 at Loxhill, Hascombe, near Godalming, Surrey, England. The aircraft was destroyed and both pilots killed when it hit trees on the top of a hill near Godalming.
- Dan-Air Flight 1903: a de Havilland Comet 4 operating a charter flight from Manchester to Barcelona crashed into a mountain near Arbúcies in Catalonia in north-eastern Spain on 3 July 1970. The aircraft was destroyed and 105 passengers and seven crew died. This was the airline's first accident resulting in fatalities among fare-paying passengers.
- 1977 Dan-Air Boeing 707 crash: a Boeing 707-321C freighter on the last leg of an international cargo flight from Heathrow crashed near Lusaka Airport on 14 May 1977. The right-hand horizontal stabiliser — including the elevator assembly — detached during the approach as a result of metal fatigue, causing loss of pitch control. Other factors included the rear spar structure's inadequate fail-safe design, the safety regulator's design assessment and certification process as well as the inspection procedure adopted by the aircraft's operator. The accident killed all six occupants. It sparked a debate on maintenance requirements as well as service life limitations of "geriatric" jets.
- Dan-Air Flight 0034: a Hawker Siddeley 748 series 1 (registration G-BEKF) operating an oil industry support flight crashed on 31 July 1979 at Sumburgh Airport in the Shetland Islands, Scotland. The aircraft failed to become airborne, ran through the perimeter fence, and crashed into the sea. The accident was due to the elevator gust lock having become re-engaged, preventing the aircraft from rotating into a flying attitude. The aircraft was destroyed and 17 of the 47 on board drowned.
- Dan-Air Flight 1008: a Boeing 727-46 (registration G-BDAN) crashed on 25 April 1980 while preparing to land at Los Rodeos (now Tenerife North Airport), Canary Islands, at the end of a charter flight from Manchester. The aircraft flew into high terrain when it turned the wrong way in a holding pattern. The aircraft was destroyed and all 146 on board were killed. This accident was the deadliest air disaster involving a British-registered aircraft in terms of loss of life.
- Dan-Air Flight 240: on 26 June 1981 a Hawker Siddeley 748 series 2 (registration G-ASPL) on a regular postal flight from Gatwick to East Midlands Airport crashed at Nailstone in Leicestershire (12 miles from its destination) killing both pilots and the postal assistant on board. The aircraft's right rear door had sprung open in mid-air. It subsequently detached, hit the horizontal tailplane and became stuck on the leading edge. This resulted in a loss of control causing the aircraft to enter a steep dive, during which its wings and tailplane failed as a result of overstressing.

=== Non-fatal incidents ===
In addition to the fatal accidents listed above, Dan-Air suffered a number of non-fatal incidents, most of which occurred during the early years of the airline's existence in the piston-engined era. These usually damaged the aircraft involved beyond repair but did not cause any loss of lives.

There were five incidents that made the headlines of the local and/or international mass media:

- In 1971, one of the airline's Comets operating a charter flight carrying Turkish migrant workers from Berlin Tegel to Istanbul was "escorted" by Bulgarian fighter aircraft into Sofia. The crew flying the aircraft was attempting to take the shortest route to Istanbul when leaving Yugoslav airspace by entering Bulgarian airspace, instead of taking the longer route through Greek airspace. They were not aware of the then communist government of Bulgaria's decision not to let any aircraft enter its airspace whose flight had originated or was going to terminate at a West Berlin airport, without stopping en route at another airport outside West Berlin. The aircraft landed safely at Sofia. It was released along with its crew and passengers when the flight's commander paid the fine the Bulgarian authorities had imposed for violating their country's airspace.
- In 1973, Somali fighter aircraft forced a Dan-Air Boeing 707 flying through Somali air space en route from London Gatwick to the Seychelles and Mauritius with 83 passengers on board to land at Mogadishu Airport. The aircraft was flying through Somali airspace in violation of the prescribed procedure to apply for permission to do so in advance, as a result of an "administrative oversight" on the airline's part. As a consequence of this violation, the aircraft's captain was taken to court and a fine of £600 was imposed on the airline.
- In 1974, one of the company's Boeing 727s (a Boeing 727-46, registration: G-BAEF) hit the localiser antenna of Luton Airport's Instrument Landing System while taking off on a charter flight to Corfu, rendering the system inoperative. The aircraft diverted to London Gatwick where it landed safely.
- On 30 September 1988, while completing the repair and run-up of the faulty engine that had caused a rejected takeoff due to an engine oil warning at Berlin Tegel, Dan-Air Boeing 727-217Adv. G-BKAG collided with a jetway at the airport's terminal building while maintenance engineers taxied the aircraft back to its stand. This badly injured the ground crew member manning the jetway and ruptured the fully refuelled aircraft's centre wing tank at the left wing root. As a result, a large quantity of jet fuel spilled onto the tarmac. The maintenance engineers' failure to pressurise the aircraft's hydraulics had resulted in a complete loss of hydraulic pressure just before reaching the stand, making it impossible to steer the aircraft and rendering the brakes ineffective.
- On 2 March 1989, a Dan Air HS 748 mistakenly landed at Langford Lodge Airport instead of the nearby Belfast Aldergrove Airport, the intended destination of the scheduled service from Newcastle. When the aircraft broke cloud over Lough Neagh on short finals for Aldergrove's runway 07, the pilot in command thought what he had spotted was the correct runway and proceeded to land the plane at what turned out to be the adjacent, privately owned, Langford Lodge airfield, just under a mile short of the approach to runway 07 at Aldergrove.
