= Netherley =

Netherley may refer to:

- Netherley, Liverpool, an area in Merseyside, England
- Netherley, West Yorkshire, a location in England
- Netherley, Aberdeenshire, a village in Aberdeenshire, Scotland
