= List of United Kingdom locations: Na-Nev =

The United Kingdom

This is part of the list of United Kingdom locations: a gazetteer of place names in the United Kingdom showing each place's locality and geographical coordinates.

== Na ==
Location	Locality	Coordinates (links to map & photo sources)	OS grid reference
Nab Hill	Kirklees	53.65°N 01.74°W	SE1718
Nab's Head	Lancashire	53.75°N 02.57°W	SD6229
Naburn	York	53.89°N 01.10°W	SE5945
Nab Wood	Bradford	53.82°N 01.81°W	SE1237
Naccolt	Kent	51.15°N 00.91°E	TR0444
Nackington	Kent	51.24°N 01.07°E	TR1554
Nacton	Suffolk	52.01°N 01.21°E	TM2140
Nadderwater	Devon	50.72°N 03.57°W	SX8993
Nafferton	East Riding of Yorkshire	54.01°N 00.39°W	TA0559
Na Gearrannan (Garenin)	Western Isles	58.29°N 06.79°W	NB1944
Nag's Head	Gloucestershire	51.68°N 02.16°W	ST8998
Naid-y-march	Flintshire	53.26°N 03.26°W	SJ1675
Nailbridge	Gloucestershire	51.84°N 02.52°W	SO6416
Nailsbourne	Somerset	51.05°N 03.12°W	ST2128
Nailsea	North Somerset	51.41°N 02.77°W	ST4669
Nailstone	Leicestershire	52.65°N 01.39°W	SK4107
Nailsworth	Gloucestershire	51.68°N 02.23°W	ST8499
Nailwell	Bath and North East Somerset	51.33°N 02.43°W	ST7060
Nairn	Highland	57.58°N 03.87°W	NH8856
Nalderswood	Surrey	51.19°N 00.24°W	TQ2345
Nance	Cornwall	50.24°N 05.28°W	SW6644
Nanceddan	Cornwall	50.14°N 05.50°W	SW5033
Nancegollan	Cornwall	50.14°N 05.31°W	SW6332
Nancemellin	Cornwall	50.22°N 05.36°W	SW6041
Nancenoy	Cornwall	50.10°N 05.17°W	SW7328
Nancledra	Cornwall	50.16°N 05.51°W	SW4935
Nangreaves	Bury	53.63°N 02.28°W	SD8115
Nannau	Gwynedd	52.76°N 03.86°W	SH7420
Nannerch	Flintshire	53.21°N 03.25°W	SJ1669
Nanpantan	Leicestershire	52.74°N 01.26°W	SK5017
Nanpean	Cornwall	50.36°N 04.87°W	SW9656
Nanquidno	Cornwall	50.10°N 05.69°W	SW3629
Nanstallon	Cornwall	50.46°N 04.77°W	SX0367
Nant	Carmarthenshire	51.84°N 04.28°W	SN4319
Nant	Denbighshire	53.10°N 03.21°W	SJ1957
Nant Alyn	Flintshire	53.18°N 03.21°W	SJ1966
Nant-ddu	Rhondda, Cynon, Taff	51.82°N 03.45°W	SO0015
Nanternis	Ceredigion	52.17°N 04.38°W	SN3756
Nantgaredig	Carmarthenshire	51.86°N 04.19°W	SN4921
Nantgarw	Rhondda, Cynon, Taff	51.55°N 03.27°W	ST1285
Nant-glas	Powys	52.27°N 03.48°W	SN9965
Nantglyn	Denbighshire	53.14°N 03.49°W	SJ0062
Nantgwyn	Powys	52.37°N 03.51°W	SN9776
Nantithet	Cornwall	50.05°N 05.24°W	SW6822
Nantlle	Gwynedd	53.05°N 04.23°W	SH5053
Nant Mawr	Flintshire	53.15°N 03.09°W	SJ2763
Nantmawr	Shropshire	52.80°N 03.12°W	SJ2424
Nantmel	Powys	52.28°N 03.42°W	SO0366
Nantmor	Gwynedd	52.99°N 04.08°W	SH6046
Nant Peris	Gwynedd	53.10°N 04.09°W	SH6058
Nantserth	Powys	52.31°N 03.52°W	SN9670
Nantwich	Cheshire	53.06°N 02.52°W	SJ6552
Nant-y-Bai	Carmarthenshire	52.08°N 03.79°W	SN7744
Nant-y-Bwch	Blaenau Gwent	51.78°N 03.27°W	SO1210
Nant-y-cafn	Neath Port Talbot	51.74°N 03.72°W	SN8107
Nantycaws	Carmarthenshire	51.83°N 04.25°W	SN4518
Nant y Caws	Shropshire	52.82°N 03.07°W	SJ2826
Nant-y-ceisiad	Caerphilly	51.59°N 03.15°W	ST2089
Nant-y-derry	Monmouthshire	51.74°N 02.97°W	SO3306
Nant-y-felin	Conwy	53.24°N 03.97°W	SH6874
Nant-y-ffin	Carmarthenshire	51.96°N 04.11°W	SN5532
Nantyffyllon	Bridgend	51.61°N 03.66°W	SS8592
Nantyglo	Blaenau Gwent	51.78°N 03.17°W	SO1910
Nant-y-gollen	Shropshire	52.84°N 03.12°W	SJ2428
Nant-y-moel	Bridgend	51.61°N 03.54°W	SS9392
Nant-y-pandy	Conwy	53.24°N 03.96°W	SH6974
Nant-y-Rhiw	Conwy	53.10°N 03.76°W	SH8258
Nantyronen Station	Ceredigion	52.38°N 03.95°W	SN6778
Napchester	Kent	51.17°N 01.30°E	TR3147
Naphill	Buckinghamshire	51.66°N 00.78°W	SU8497
Napleton	Worcestershire	52.13°N 02.22°W	SO8548
Napley	Staffordshire	52.92°N 02.43°W	SJ7137
Napley Heath	Staffordshire	52.93°N 02.41°W	SJ7238
Nappa	North Yorkshire	53.97°N 02.23°W	SD8553
Nappa Scar	North Yorkshire	54.31°N 02.06°W	SD9691
Napton on the Hill	Warwickshire	52.24°N 01.32°W	SP4661
Narberth	Pembrokeshire	51.79°N 04.75°W	SN1014
Narberth Bridge	Pembrokeshire	51.79°N 04.75°W	SN1014
Narborough	Leicestershire	52.56°N 01.20°W	SP5497
Narborough	Norfolk	52.67°N 00.57°E	TF7412
Nare Point	Cornwall	50.08°N 05.08°W	SW795247
Narfords	Devon	50.84°N 03.01°W	ST2906
Narkurs	Cornwall	50.37°N 04.36°W	SX3255
Narrachan	Argyll and Bute	56.27°N 05.37°W	NM9114
Narracott	Devon	50.92°N 04.33°W	SS3617
Narrowgate Corner	Norfolk	52.67°N 01.60°E	TG4415
Nasareth	Gwynedd	53.02°N 04.28°W	SH4750
Naseby	Northamptonshire	52.38°N 01.00°W	SP6877
Nash	Bromley	51.34°N 00.01°E	TQ4063
Nash	Buckinghamshire	51.99°N 00.86°W	SP7834
Nash	Herefordshire	52.25°N 03.02°W	SO3062
Nash	Kent	51.27°N 01.23°E	TR2658
Nash	City of Newport	51.54°N 02.95°W	ST3483
Nash	Shropshire	52.33°N 02.58°W	SO6071
Nash	Somerset	50.91°N 02.67°W	ST5313
Nash End	Worcestershire	52.42°N 02.33°W	SO7781
Nashend	Gloucestershire	51.74°N 02.16°W	SO8905
Nashes Green	Hampshire	51.20°N 01.04°W	SU6745
Nash Lee	Buckinghamshire	51.76°N 00.78°W	SP8408
Nash Mills	Hertfordshire	51.72°N 00.46°W	TL0604
Nash Point	The Vale Of Glamorgan	51.40°N 03.55°W	SS917682
Nash Street	East Sussex	50.88°N 00.18°E	TQ5412
Nash Street	Kent	51.39°N 00.35°E	TQ6469
Nask	Western Isles	56.95°N 07.51°W	NL6598
Nassington	Northamptonshire	52.55°N 00.43°W	TL0696
Nastend	Gloucestershire	51.75°N 02.30°W	SO7906
Nast Hyde	Hertfordshire	51.74°N 00.24°W	TL2107
Nasty	Hertfordshire	51.89°N 00.03°W	TL3524
Natcott	Devon	50.98°N 04.46°W	SS2723
Nateby	Cumbria	54.44°N 02.35°W	NY7706
Nateby	Lancashire	53.88°N 02.82°W	SD4644
Nately Scures	Hampshire	51.27°N 00.99°W	SU7053
Natland	Cumbria	54.29°N 02.73°W	SD5289
Natton	Gloucestershire	51.98°N 02.11°W	SO9232
Naughton	Suffolk	52.09°N 00.94°E	TM0248
Naunton	Gloucestershire	51.90°N 01.84°W	SP1123
Naunton	Worcestershire	52.04°N 02.19°W	SO8739
Naunton Beauchamp	Worcestershire	52.16°N 02.05°W	SO9652
Navant Hill	West Sussex	51.04°N 00.66°W	SU9428
Navarino	Cornwall	50.67°N 04.43°W	SX2889
Navax Point	Cornwall	50.23°N 05.38°W	SW586429
Nave Island	Argyll and Bute	55.90°N 06.33°W	NR289759
Navenby	Lincolnshire	53.10°N 00.53°W	SK9857
Navestock Heath	Essex	51.65°N 00.21°E	TQ5397
Navestock Side	Essex	51.65°N 00.25°E	TQ5697
Navidale	Highland	58.12°N 03.64°W	ND0316
Nawton	North Yorkshire	54.24°N 01.00°W	SE6584
Nayland	Suffolk	51.96°N 00.86°E	TL9734
Nazeing	Essex	51.73°N 00.04°E	TL4106
Nazeing Gate	Essex	51.72°N 00.04°E	TL4105
Nazeing Long Green	Essex	51.71°N 00.02°E	TL4004
Nazeing Mead	Essex	51.74°N 00.00°E	TL3806

== Ne ==
=== Nea ===
Location	Locality	Coordinates (links to map & photo sources)	OS grid reference
Neacroft	Dorset	50.76°N 01.74°W	SZ1896
Nealhouse	Cumbria	54.84°N 03.04°W	NY3351
Neal's Green	Warwickshire	52.45°N 01.51°W	SP3384
Neames Forstal	Kent	51.27°N 00.93°E	TR0557
Near Hardcastle	North Yorkshire	54.08°N 01.83°W	SE1165
Near Sawrey	Cumbria	54.34°N 02.97°W	SD3795
Nearton End	Buckinghamshire	51.92°N 00.83°W	SP8026
Neasden	Brent	51.55°N 00.25°W	TQ2185
Neasham	Darlington	54.48°N 01.50°W	NZ3210
Neat Enstone	Oxfordshire	51.91°N 01.46°W	SP3724
Neath (Castell-Nedd)	Neath Port Talbot	51.65°N 03.82°W	SS7497
Neath Abbey	Neath Port Talbot	51.66°N 03.83°W	SS7398
Neatham	Hampshire	51.15°N 00.94°W	SU7440
Neath Hill	Milton Keynes	52.05°N 00.76°W	SP8540
Neatishead	Norfolk	52.72°N 01.46°E	TG3420
Neat Marsh	East Riding of Yorkshire	53.76°N 00.25°W	TA1531
Neaton	Norfolk	52.57°N 00.81°E	TF9101
Neave Island (Coomb Island)	Highland	58.54°N 04.29°W	NC663643

=== Neb–Nei ===
Location	Locality	Coordinates (links to map & photo sources)	OS grid reference
Nebo	Ceredigion	52.26°N 04.14°W	SN5465
Nebo	Conwy	53.08°N 03.74°W	SH8356
Nebo	Gwynedd	53.02°N 04.28°W	SH4750
Nebo	Isle of Anglesey	53.38°N 04.31°W	SH4690
Nebsworth	Warwickshire	52.07°N 01.72°W	SP1942
Nechells	Birmingham	52.49°N 01.86°W	SP0989
Nechells Green	Birmingham	52.48°N 01.88°W	SP0887
Necton	Norfolk	52.64°N 00.76°E	TF8709
Nedd	Highland	58.22°N 05.18°W	NC1331
Nedderton	Northumberland	55.12°N 01.64°W	NZ2381
Nedge Hill	Shropshire	52.66°N 02.43°W	SJ7107
Nedge Hill	Somerset	51.25°N 02.60°W	ST5851
Nedging	Suffolk	52.09°N 00.90°E	TL9948
Nedging Tye	Suffolk	52.10°N 00.93°E	TM0149
Needham	Norfolk	52.38°N 01.26°E	TM2281
Needham Green	Essex	51.81°N 00.24°E	TL5515
Needham Market	Suffolk	52.15°N 01.03°E	TM0855
Needham Street	Suffolk	52.25°N 00.51°E	TL7265
Needingworth	Cambridgeshire	52.33°N 00.03°W	TL3472
Needs Ore Point	Hampshire	50.77°N 01.37°W	SZ439975
Needwood	Staffordshire	52.81°N 01.73°W	SK1824
Neen Savage	Shropshire	52.39°N 02.48°W	SO6777
Neen Sollars	Shropshire	52.34°N 02.51°W	SO6572
Neenton	Shropshire	52.47°N 02.54°W	SO6387
Nefod	Shropshire	52.91°N 03.04°W	SJ3036
Nefyn	Gwynedd	52.93°N 04.53°W	SH3040
Neighbourne	Somerset	51.23°N 02.51°W	ST6448
Neight Hill	Worcestershire	52.22°N 02.08°W	SO9458
Neilston	East Renfrewshire	55.78°N 04.44°W	NS4757
Neithrop	Oxfordshire	52.05°N 01.35°W	SP4440

=== Nel–Nes ===
Location	Locality	Coordinates (links to map & photo sources)	OS grid reference
Nelson	Caerphilly	51.64°N 03.28°W	ST1195
Nelson	Lancashire	53.82°N 02.21°W	SD8637
Nelson Village	Northumberland	55.08°N 01.60°W	NZ2577
Nemphlar	South Lanarkshire	55.67°N 03.83°W	NS8544
Nempnett Thrubwell	Bath and North East Somerset	51.33°N 02.67°W	ST5360
Nene Terrace	Cambridgeshire	52.64°N 00.15°W	TF2507
Nenthall	Cumbria	54.79°N 02.39°W	NY7545
Nenthead	Cumbria	54.78°N 02.34°W	NY7843
Nenthorn	Scottish Borders	55.62°N 02.52°W	NT6737
Neopardy	Devon	50.77°N 03.71°W	SX7999
Nepcote	West Sussex	50.86°N 00.40°W	TQ1208
Nepgill	Cumbria	54.64°N 03.45°W	NY0629
Nep Town	West Sussex	50.92°N 00.27°W	TQ2115
Nerabus	Argyll and Bute	55.70°N 06.42°W	NR2255
Nercwys	Flintshire	53.14°N 03.15°W	SJ2361
Nerston	South Lanarkshire	55.77°N 04.17°W	NS6456
Ness	Cheshire	53.27°N 03.05°W	SJ3076
Nesscliffe	Shropshire	52.76°N 02.92°W	SJ3819
Nesfield	North Yorkshire	53.94°N 1.86°W	SE092495
Ness Holt	Cheshire	53.27°N 03.05°W	SJ3076
Ness of Ork	Orkney Islands	59.08°N 02.81°W	HY535222
Nesstoun	Orkney Islands	59.35°N 02.42°W	HY7652
Neston	Cheshire	53.28°N 03.08°W	SJ2877
Neston	Wiltshire	51.41°N 02.20°W	ST8668

=== Net ===
Location	Locality	Coordinates (links to map & photo sources)	OS grid reference
Netham	City of Bristol	51.44°N 02.56°W	ST6172
Nethanfoot	South Lanarkshire	55.70°N 03.87°W	NS8247
Nether Alderley	Cheshire	53.28°N 02.24°W	SJ8476
Netheravon	Wiltshire	51.23°N 01.80°W	SU1448
Nether Blainslie	Scottish Borders	55.67°N 02.73°W	NT5443
Nether Booth	Derbyshire	53.37°N 01.79°W	SK1486
Netherbrae	Aberdeenshire	57.62°N 02.35°W	NJ7959
Netherbrough	Orkney Islands	59.02°N 03.22°W	HY3016
Nether Broughton	Leicestershire	52.81°N 00.97°W	SK6925
Netherburn	South Lanarkshire	55.70°N 03.91°W	NS8047
Nether Burrow	Lancashire	54.16°N 02.59°W	SD6175
Nether Burrows	Derbyshire	52.94°N 01.59°W	SK2739
Netherbury	Dorset	50.78°N 02.76°W	SY4699
Netherby	Cumbria	55.03°N 02.95°W	NY3971
Netherby	West Yorkshire	53.90°N 01.49°W	SE3346
Nether Cassock	Dumfries and Galloway	55.31°N 03.21°W	NT2303
Nether Cerne	Dorset	50.78°N 02.48°W	SY6698
Netherclay	Somerset	50.97°N 03.06°W	ST2520
Nether Clifton	Dumfries and Galloway	54.88°N 03.70°W	NX9156
Nether Compton	Dorset	50.95°N 02.58°W	ST5917
Nethercote	Oxfordshire	52.06°N 01.31°W	SP4741
Nethercote	Warwickshire	52.27°N 01.25°W	SP5164
Nethercott (Braunton)	Devon	51.13°N 04.17°W	SS4839
Nethercott (Tetcott)	Devon	50.74°N 04.34°W	SX3596
Nethercott	Oxfordshire	51.87°N 01.30°W	SP4820
Nethercott	Somerset	51.08°N 03.22°W	ST1432
Nether Dallachy	Moray	57.65°N 03.07°W	NJ3663
Nether Dysart	Angus	56.66°N 02.50°W	NO6953
Nether Edge	Sheffield	53.35°N 01.50°W	SK3384
Netherend	Gloucestershire	51.69°N 02.59°W	SO5900
Nether End	Barnsley	53.55°N 01.63°W	SE2407
Nether End	Derbyshire	53.24°N 01.62°W	SK2572
Nether End	Leicestershire	52.71°N 00.90°W	SK7414
Nether Exe	Devon	50.78°N 03.51°W	SS9300
Netherfield	Buckinghamshire	52.01°N 00.73°W	SP8736
Netherfield	East Sussex	50.93°N 00.43°E	TQ7118
Netherfield	Nottinghamshire	52.95°N 01.09°W	SK6140
Nethergate	Norfolk	52.81°N 01.04°E	TG0529
Nether Hall	City of Leicester	52.64°N 01.07°W	SK6306
Netherhampton	Wiltshire	51.06°N 01.85°W	SU1029
Nether Handley	Derbyshire	53.28°N 01.40°W	SK4077
Nether Handwick	Angus	56.55°N 03.04°W	NO3641
Nether Haugh	Rotherham	53.45°N 01.38°W	SK4196
Netherhay	Dorset	50.84°N 02.83°W	ST4105
Nether Headon	Nottinghamshire	53.28°N 00.89°W	SK7477
Nether Heage	Derbyshire	53.04°N 01.46°W	SK3650
Nether Heyford	Northamptonshire	52.21°N 01.03°W	SP6658
Nether Horsburgh	Scottish Borders	55.64°N 03.11°W	NT3039
Nether Kellet	Lancashire	54.10°N 02.76°W	SD5068
Nether Kidston	Scottish Borders	55.67°N 03.22°W	NT2343
Nether Kinmundy	Aberdeenshire	57.47°N 01.93°W	NK0443
Nether Kirkton	East Renfrewshire	55.78°N 04.42°W	NS4857
Netherland Green	Staffordshire	52.86°N 01.85°W	SK1030
Nether Langwith	Nottinghamshire	53.22°N 01.20°W	SK5370
Netherlee	East Renfrewshire	55.79°N 04.28°W	NS5758
Netherley	Aberdeenshire	57.02°N 02.26°W	NO8493
Netherley	Liverpool	53.38°N 02.84°W	SJ4488
Netherley	West Yorkshire	53.58°N 01.94°W	SE0410
Nether Loads	Derbyshire	53.21°N 01.52°W	SK3269
Nethermill	Dumfries and Galloway	55.16°N 03.50°W	NY0487
Nethermills	Aberdeenshire	57.53°N 02.83°W	NJ5050
Nether Moor	Derbyshire	53.19°N 01.43°W	SK3866
Nethermuir	Aberdeenshire	57.48°N 02.16°W	NJ9044
Netheroyd Hill	West Yorkshire	53.66°N 01.78°W	SE1419
Nether Padley	Derbyshire	53.29°N 01.62°W	SK2578
Netherplace	East Renfrewshire	55.76°N 04.36°W	NS5255
Nether Poppleton	York	53.97°N 01.14°W	SE5654
Netherraw	Scottish Borders	55.49°N 02.71°W	NT5523
Nether Row	Cumbria	54.72°N 03.05°W	NY3237
Netherseal	Derbyshire	52.71°N 01.58°W	SK2813
Nether Shiels	Scottish Borders	55.70°N 02.94°W	NT4146
Nether Silton	North Yorkshire	54.32°N 01.30°W	SE4592
Nether Skyborry	Shropshire	52.35°N 03.07°W	SO2773
Netherstoke	Dorset	50.87°N 02.65°W	ST5409
Nether Stowe	Staffordshire	52.68°N 01.82°W	SK1210
Nether Stowey	Somerset	51.14°N 03.15°W	ST1939
Nether Street	Essex	51.78°N 00.28°E	TL5812
Nether Street	Hertfordshire	51.82°N 00.05°E	TL4216
Nether Street	Suffolk	52.21°N 00.80°E	TL9261
Netherthird	East Ayrshire	55.43°N 04.26°W	NS5718
Netherthong	Kirklees	53.57°N 01.80°W	SE1309
Netherthorpe	Derbyshire	53.26°N 01.34°W	SK4474
Netherton	Angus	56.70°N 02.75°W	NO5457
Netherton	Cheshire	53.27°N 02.73°W	SJ5176
Netherton	Cornwall	50.52°N 04.42°W	SX2872
Netherton	Cumbria	54.70°N 03.50°W	NY0335
Netherton	Devon	50.52°N 03.56°W	SX8971
Netherton	Dudley	52.49°N 02.08°W	SO9488
Netherton	Gloucestershire	51.73°N 01.78°W	SP1504
Netherton	Hampshire	51.31°N 01.47°W	SU3757
Netherton	Herefordshire	51.93°N 02.69°W	SO5226
Netherton	Kirklees	53.61°N 01.82°W	SE1213
Netherton	North Lanarkshire	55.76°N 03.94°W	NS7854
Netherton	Northumberland	55.35°N 02.03°W	NT9807
Netherton	Oxfordshire	51.68°N 01.40°W	SU4199
Netherton	Perth and Kinross	56.65°N 03.40°W	NO1452
Netherton	Sefton	53.49°N 02.98°W	SD3500
Netherton	Shropshire	52.43°N 02.39°W	SO7382
Netherton	Stirling	55.98°N 04.32°W	NS5579
Netherton	Wakefield	53.64°N 01.59°W	SE2716
Netherton	Worcestershire	52.06°N 02.01°W	SO9941
Nethertown	Cumbria	54.44°N 03.57°W	NX9807
Nethertown	Highland	58.68°N 03.12°W	ND3578
Nethertown	Lancashire	53.81°N 02.42°W	SD7236
Nethertown	Staffordshire	52.75°N 01.85°W	SK1017
Nether Wallop	Hampshire	51.12°N 01.57°W	SU3036
Nether Warden	Northumberland	54.99°N 02.14°W	NY9167
Nether Wasdale	Cumbria	54.42°N 03.35°W	NY1204
Nether Welton	Cumbria	54.79°N 03.01°W	NY3545
Nether Westcote	Gloucestershire	51.87°N 01.68°W	SP2220
Nether Whitacre	Warwickshire	52.52°N 01.66°W	SP2392
Nether Winchendon	Buckinghamshire	51.80°N 00.94°W	SP7312
Netherwitton	Northumberland	55.20°N 01.86°W	NZ0990
Nether Worton	Oxfordshire	51.96°N 01.39°W	SP4230
Nether Yeadon	Leeds	53.85°N 01.69°W	SE2040
Nethy Bridge	Highland	57.26°N 03.65°W	NJ0020
Netley	Hampshire	50.86°N 01.36°W	SU4508
Netley Hill	Hampshire	50.89°N 01.33°W	SU4711
Netley Marsh	Hampshire	50.90°N 01.53°W	SU3312
Nettacott	Devon	50.78°N 03.56°W	SX9099
Netteswell	Essex	51.77°N 00.10°E	TL4510
Nettlebed	Oxfordshire	51.56°N 01.00°W	SU6986
Nettlebridge	Somerset	51.23°N 02.51°W	ST6448
Nettlecombe	Dorset	50.75°N 02.69°W	SY5195
Nettlecombe	Isle of Wight	50.59°N 01.26°W	SZ5278
Nettleden	Hertfordshire	51.77°N 00.53°W	TL0110
Nettleham	Lincolnshire	53.26°N 00.50°W	TF0075
Nettlestead	Kent	51.24°N 00.40°E	TQ6852
Nettlestead	Suffolk	52.10°N 01.03°E	TM0849
Nettlestead Green	Kent	51.22°N 00.40°E	TQ6850
Nettlestone	Isle of Wight	50.70°N 01.12°W	SZ6290
Nettlesworth	Durham	54.81°N 01.61°W	NZ2547
Nettleton	Gloucestershire	51.81°N 02.08°W	SO9413
Nettleton	Lincolnshire	53.48°N 00.34°W	TA1000
Nettleton	Wiltshire	51.50°N 02.27°W	ST8178
Nettleton Green	Wiltshire	51.50°N 02.27°W	ST8178
Nettleton Hill	Kirklees	53.64°N 01.86°W	SE0917
Nettleton Shrub	Wiltshire	51.49°N 02.26°W	ST8277
Nettleton Top	Lincolnshire	53.46°N 00.32°W	TF1198
Netton	Wiltshire	51.12°N 01.81°W	SU1336

=== Neu–Nev ===
Location	Locality	Coordinates (links to map & photo sources)	OS grid reference				
Neuadd	Carmarthenshire	51.87°N 03.90°W	SN6921	Nevendon	Essex	51.59°N 00.52°E	TQ7591
Nevern	Pembrokeshire	52.01°N 04.79°W	SN0839				
Neville's Cross	Durham	54.76°N 01.61°W	NZ2541				
Nev of Stuis	Shetland Islands	60.64°N 01.16°W	HU456961				
