= Flight 240 =

Flight 240 may refer to:

- Malév Flight 240, crashed on 30 September 1975
- Dan-Air Flight 240, crashed on 26 June 1981
