= Yvonne Pope Sintes =

South Africa-born British aviator (1930–2021)

- Born: Yvonne Elizabeth van den Hoek; 8 September 1930; Pretoria, South Africa
- Died: 16 August 2021
- Occupation(s): Pilot, aviator, flight instructor, air traffic controller

Yvonne Pope Sintes (8 September 1930 – 16 August 2021) was a South African-born British aviator. She was the first female air traffic controller at Gatwick airport and later became Britain's first female commercial airline captain.

== Early life ==
Sintes was born Yvonne Elizabeth van den Hoek on 8 September 1930 in Pretoria, South Africa, the eldest of three daughters of Iris (née Kyle) and Marcel van den Hoek. The family had English, Scottish, American, Dutch and Huguenot ancestry, and the children were raised "with an abiding love of music."

The family moved to Britain in 1936 when her father was appointed overseas manager of the South African Citrus Exchange. They settled near Croydon, in south London from where her father often flew to Europe on business from Croydon Airport, the place which first inspired her with a wish to fly. As a school girl Yvonne devoured the Biggles books, later writing "Captain WE Johns will never know what he achieved, though he did impair my knowledge of geometry, as his most recently acquired book was often read under my desk lid".

Yvonne later returned to South Africa with her sisters and mother Iris, who worked as a teacher. Her parents divorced and although Sintes began a degree course at Rhodes University she did not enjoy it and in 1948 moved to London to join her father. She got a job at a women's magazine sorting competition entries but still wishing to fly, visited an RAF recruiting office. She was turned down as they were not interested in teaching women to fly, "and I certainly wasn't interested in a ground job". Instead, she signed up for a secretarial course.

== Career ==
However, her interest in a career in the air continued and she joined British Overseas Airways Corporation as a stewardess, working on flights to Europe, the Middle East and South America. Yvonne van den Hoek spent her spare time at the Airways Aero Club, where airline staff could take private flying lessons, and earned her private pilot's licence in July 1952. Flying back as an air hostess from Rio, the pilot Leslie Gosling invited her into the cockpit and encouraged her to consider becoming a flying instructor, a role he had undertaken in World War Two. Marriage to Eric Pope in 1953 meant she had to resign as an air hostess.

She worked a career within aviation that spanned multiple professions: air stewardess, member of the RAF Volunteer Reserve, flight instructor, air traffic controller, and pilot.

In 1953, Sintes was licensed as a private pilot and worked to build enough hours in the air to earn her assistant instructor rating at Denham. She joined the RAF Volunteer Reserve and in 1955 she became a co-founder of the British Women Pilots' Association.

Widowed the day after her second son was born, Yvonne Pope used her instructors qualification to find work as an instructor at a private flying club in Exeter. When the club became economically unviable, her application to the Ministry of Aviation was successful and she became Britain's first female air-traffic controller. She later recalled that during her training for the role that "I was initially ostracised by most of them and pointed remarks were made when I entered the room" and that it was where she met the most direct hostility of her career.

On qualification, she took over running the control tower at Bournemouth Airport. She later moved to be an air traffic controller at Gatwick Airport, working there from 1960 to 1964.

Pope kept up her flying whilst working there, working on the overnight newspaper flights to Germany or the Channel Islands, keeping her ambition of becoming an airline pilot alive.

In 1965, Morton Air Services recruited Yvonne Pope as a pilot. Her first flight as a commercial pilot was on 16 January 1965, flying a Dakota to Düsseldorf, and within six months these freight flights were interspersed with piloting passenger services.

Joining Dan-Air in 1969, she flew De Havilland Comets, the first commercial jet airliner. In 1971, her unusual status as a "lady jet pilot" was featured in an episode of Nationwide, a BBC news and current affairs programme, which interviewed the passengers she was flying to Tenerife. In 1972, she was promoted to a captaincy on the Avro 748, a turboprop aircraft, becoming Britain's first commercial airline captain, which included crew responsibility. From June 1975, she captained flights on the BAC 1-11 jet airliner.

Yvonne Pope Sintes flew as a pilot for UK-based airline Dan-Air until her retirement in 1980.

== Personal life ==
In 1953, two days before Yvonne van den Hoek married Eric Pope, the couple were flying a Tiger Moth when the fuel gauge suddenly plummeted towards empty. Flying to the west of London, the only possible site to set down was Windsor Great Park, where the problem turned out to be the aircraft's faulty fuel gauge. Pope had been her instructor at the Airways Aero Club. The couple had two sons, Jon, (d. 2021) and Chris. Eric Pope died of a cerebral haemorrhage the day after their younger son's birth.

In 1966 when on holiday in Menorca with her sons, Yvonne Pope met Miguel Sintes, a former medical student whose training had been disrupted by the Spanish Civil War. They struck up a friendship and developed a correspondence, marrying in 1970. The couple settled in Britain, Miguel taking up work at a hospital helping disadvantaged children. In 1980, they retired to Menorca, to a cottage on a former market garden. Miguel died in 1999 and the following year Yvonne Pope Sintes returned to England, settling in Cranleigh, Surrey.

Sintes celebrated her 70th birthday by flying a light aircraft for the first time for three decades. This was also her final time in the cockpit, and was a family gift, seemingly for a private flying lesson at Goodwood Flying School, in West Sussex. When the instructor realised who she was he simply handed over the controls, allowing her once more to enjoy the freedom of the skies.

Yvonne Pope Sintes died on 16 August 2021 at the age of 90.

== Awards ==
- Jean Lennox Bird Pendant from the British Women Pilots' Association in 2014.
- Brabazon Cup from the British Women Pilots' Association
