= 1958 Dan-Air Avro York crash =

1958 aviation accident

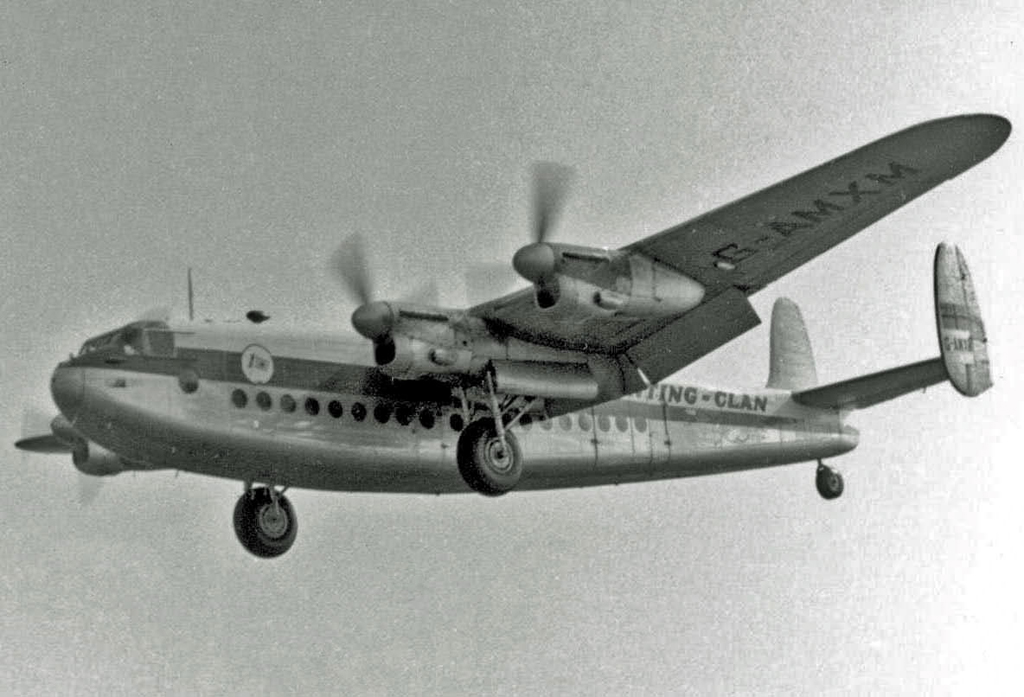
- An Avro York similar to the accident aircraft

Accident
- Date: 25 May 1958
- Summary: Engine failure and on-board fire
- Site: Near Gurgaon, Haryana, India; 28.457°N 77.026°E

Aircraft
- Aircraft type: Avro York
- Operator: Dan-Air
- Registration: G-AMUV
- Flight origin: Karachi, Pakistan
- Destination: New Delhi, India
- Passengers: 0
- Crew: 5
- Fatalities: 4
- Injuries: 0
- Survivors: 1

The 1958 Dan-Air Avro York crash was a fatal accident involving an Avro York cargo aircraft operated by Dan Air Services Limited on a non-scheduled international all-cargo service between Karachi, Pakistan, and New Delhi, India. The aircraft crashed on 25 May 1958 during an emergency landing at Gurgaon, Haryana, India, after an engine had caught fire en route from Karachi to Delhi. Four of the five occupants of the aircraft were killed.

== The aircraft ==
The aircraft, operated by Dan Air Services Ltd, was an Avro 685 York (registered in the United Kingdom as G-AMUV) that had its first flight in 1946. The York had been delivered to the Royal Air Force in February 1946, it was withdrawn from use and sold as a civilian aircraft in 1952.

== Accident ==
Following the aircraft's departure from Karachi Airport in Pakistan's Sindh province, an in-flight fire developed en route to Delhi. This necessitated an immediate forced landing on rough terrain near Gurgaon in the Indian state of Haryana, resulting in the aircraft's break-up and a post-crash fire. Among the crew of five, the radio operator was the sole survivor. This crash was Dan-Air's first fatal accident.

== Cause ==
The subsequent investigation established a mid-air fire as a consequence of an internal failure of the aircraft's no. 1 engine as the accident's probable cause.
