= Dan-Air Flight 240 =

1981 aviation accident

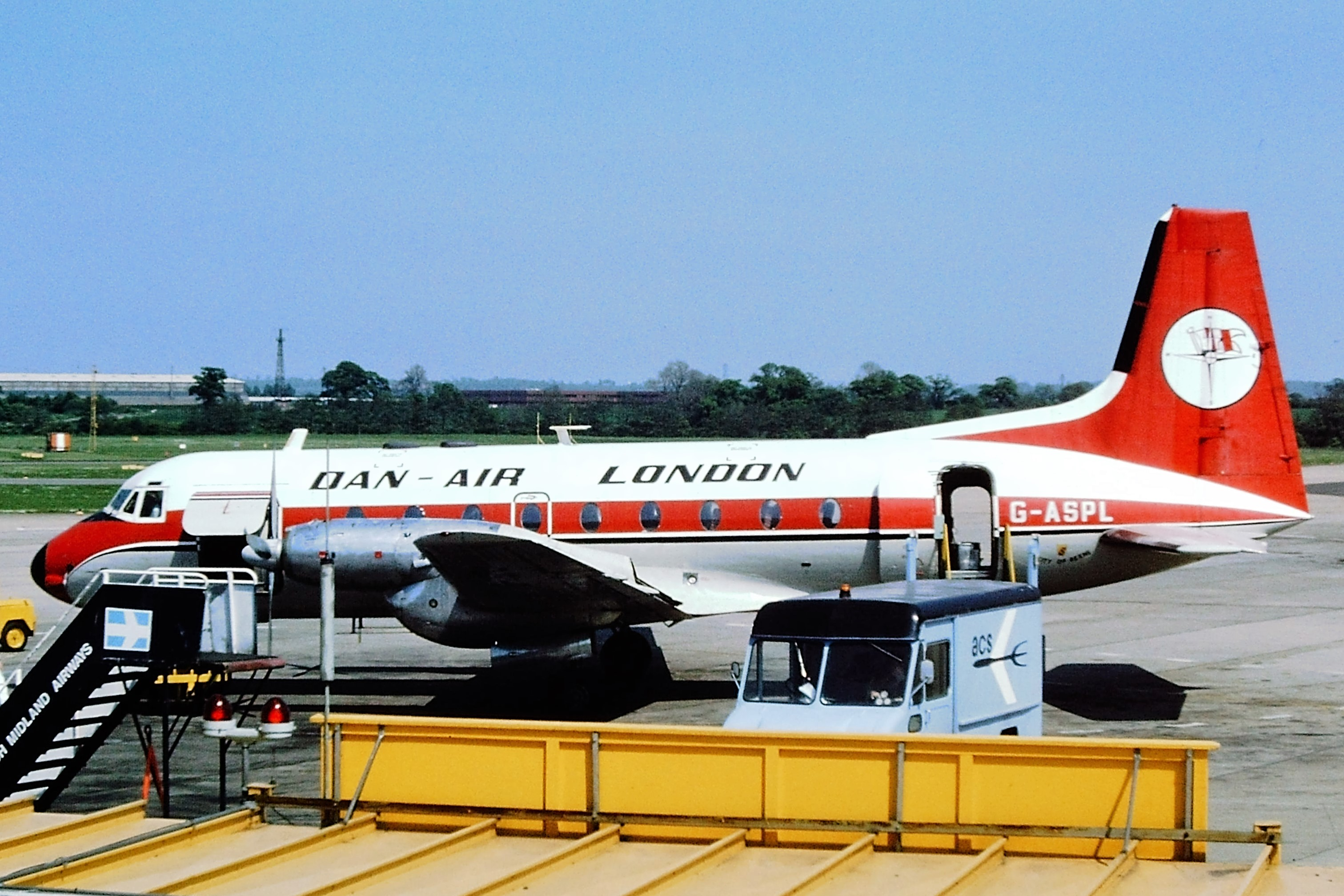
- G-ASPL, the aircraft involved in the accident

Accident
- Date: 26 June 1981
- Summary: Cabin door failure leading to loss of control
- Site: Nailstone, Leicestershire, United Kingdom; 52.6694°N 1.3702°W

Aircraft
- Aircraft type: Hawker Siddeley HS 748-108 series 2A
- Operator: Dan-Air Services Ltd
- Call sign: DAN-AIR 240
- Registration: G-ASPL
- Flight origin: London Gatwick Airport
- Destination: East Midlands Airport
- Occupants: 3
- Crew: 3
- Fatalities: 3
- Survivors: 0

Dan-Air Flight 240 was a fatal accident involving a Hawker Siddeley HS 748 series 2A turboprop aircraft operated by Dan Air Services Limited on the first stage of a night mail flight from London Gatwick Airport to East Midlands Airport. The crash, which occurred on 26 June 1981 near the village of Nailstone, Leicestershire, following major structural failure caused by the failure of a cabin door, resulted in the aircraft's destruction and the deaths of all three on board (both pilots and a cabin attendant).

== The aircraft ==
The aircraft, operated by Dan Air Services Ltd, was a Hawker Siddeley HS 748-108 series 2A (construction/manufacturer's serial number: 1560, registration: G-ASPL) that had its first flight in 1964. Skyways Coach-Air was its original operator. Dan-Air acquired the aircraft from Skyways International, Skyways Coach-Air's successor, in 1972. At the time of the accident, it had flown 34,592 hours.

== Accident ==
The aircraft departed London Gatwick at 17:28 with an estimated time of arrival (ETA) at East Midlands of 18:25. The crew included two pilots and a cabin attendant, in accordance with Dan-Air's policy to carry one attendant in addition to the flightdeck crew on mail flights. (The attendant was known as a postal assistant on these flights.)

During its initial descent towards its destination, the attendant reported that one of the cabin door's indicators was showing an unlocked condition. Shortly afterwards, the right hand rear door (the baggage door) opened, detached itself from its hinge mounts and became lodged on the leading edge of the right horizontal tailplane. Later reconstruction of the aircraft's flight path from flight recorder evidence indicated that cabin decompression occurred when it was in the vicinity of Market Bosworth.

The aircraft became uncontrollable and went into a steep dive, which terminated in several abrupt pitch oscillations. Immediately after the decompression, the pilot asked the co-pilot to transmit a "MAYDAY" and request permission from air traffic control (ATC) to come straight in for an emergency landing, reporting that he thought he had lost the rear door and that he was having severe control problems.

Shortly after, the radar controller who handled flight 240 noticed that the aircraft was turning right beyond its assigned heading; however, his attempts to contact the crew proved futile. Approximately three minutes after the last distress message, reports began to reach ATC from the police of an aircraft crash.

Several people on the ground witnessed the final moments of flight 240. The consensus of their evidence was that the stricken plane was lower than usual compared with other aircraft approaching East Midlands, and that it was losing altitude as well as oscillating in both pitch and roll. As it regained level attitude, both wings folded up almost simultaneously and became detached from the fuselage, along with other parts of the structure.

The wreckage was found scattered across several fields, approximately 1 mi (1.6 km) northeast of the village of Nailstone.

== Cause ==
It was concluded that the accident had been caused by the baggage door becoming lodged on the leading edge of the right tailplane after it had opened and detached. This changed the aircraft's aerodynamic characteristics so that it became uncontrollable. This in turn resulted in overstressing of the wings and tailplane leading to inflight structural failure, with both wings and tailplane detaching from the fuselage. Contributory factors were the mis-rigged state of the door operating mechanism, which allowed the top and bottom pairs of catches to lose synchronisation, and failure of the door warning indicators to give the crew enough time to respond to door safety alerts.

== See also ==
- United Airlines Flight 811
- American Airlines Flight 96
- Turkish Airlines Flight 981
- Alaska Airlines Flight 1282
