= Netherbrae =

Coordinates: 57°37′26″N 2°20′28″W

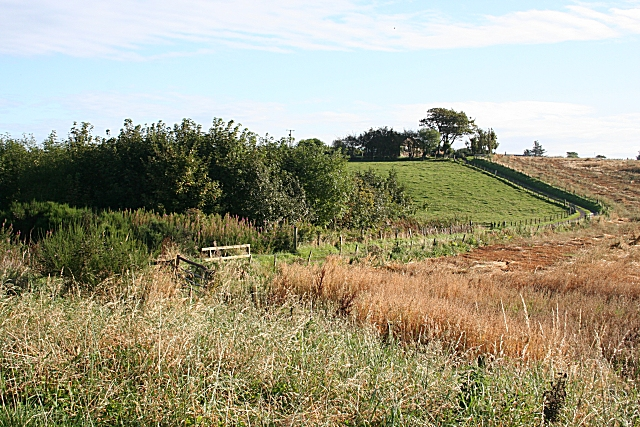

Netherbrae is an area of farmland and small crofts in Aberdeenshire, Scotland. It is approximately 8 miles (13 km) north of Turriff and 9 miles (14 km) south-east of Macduff, and is just off the main A98 road.

Netherbrae, like many of the neighbouring small areas, does not form a distinctly identifiable village, but is somewhat ill-defined by maps and roadsigns, and in practice it overlaps with the areas around it including Overbrae, Hill of Overbrae, Mid Clochforbie, and South Clochforbie, the latter two appearing on Ordnance Survey maps of the 19th Century as part of "Crofts of Clochforbie". Postal addresses in Netherbrae traditionally included the similarly loosely defined Fishrie (sometimes spelt "Fisherie"), but are now officially in the Turriff post town. The postcode district is AB53. Local telephone numbers bear the 01261 area code.

Farming in the region is mixed, with some land given over to crop production, some to sheep and cattle, and some to pockets of forestry. There are a few businesses catering mainly to the agricultural community, a large used-car dealership, an animal rescue sanctuary, and holiday-let yurts.
