= Nance, Cornwall =

Hamlet in Cornwall, England

Coordinates: 50.184°N 5.484°W

Nance
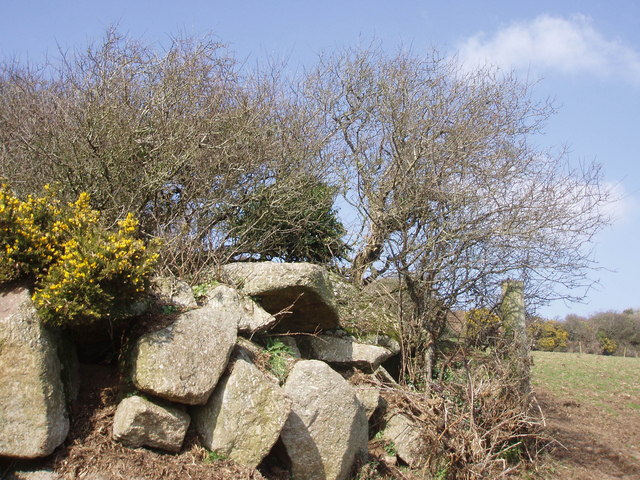
- Gate and gorse, looking northeast from Nance

- Location within Cornwall
- OS grid reference: SW514374
- Unitary authority: Cornwall
- Ceremonial county: Cornwall
- Region: South West
- Country: England
- Sovereign state: United Kingdom

Nance is a hamlet southwest of Carbis Bay in west Cornwall, England.
