= Netherton (ward) =

- Shown within Hyndburn
- Area: 2.76 km^{2} (1.07 sq mi)
- Population: 4,486 (2011)
  - Density: 1,625/km^{2} (4,210/sq mi)
- District: Hyndburn
- Ceremonial county: Lancashire
- Region: North West
- Country: England
- Sovereign state: United Kingdom
- UK Parliament: Hyndburn
- Councillors: Noordad Aziz (Labour); Bernadette Parkinson (Labour)

Netherton is one of the 18 electoral wards that form the Parliamentary constituency of Hyndburn, Lancashire, England. The ward returns two councillors to represent eastern Great Harwood on the Hyndburn Borough Council. As of the May 2018 Council election, Netherton had an electorate of 3,247.
