= Nancemellin =

Hamlet in Cornwall, England

Coordinates: 50.220°N 5.359°W

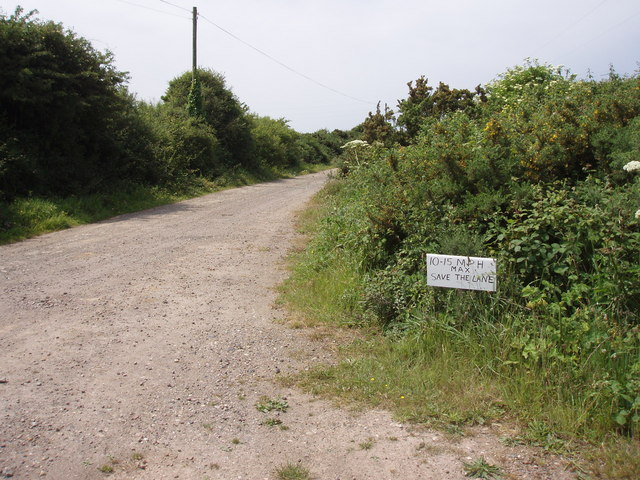
- Nanterrow lane near Nancemellin

- Location within Cornwall
- OS grid reference: SW605410
- Civil parish: Gwinear-Gwithian
- Unitary authority: Cornwall
- Ceremonial county: Cornwall
- Region: South West
- Country: England
- Sovereign state: United Kingdom

Nancemellin is a hamlet in the parish of Gwinear-Gwithian, Cornwall, England.
