= Fyfield, Oxfordshire =

Village in Oxfordshire, England

Coordinates: 51.686°N 1.389°W

Fyfield
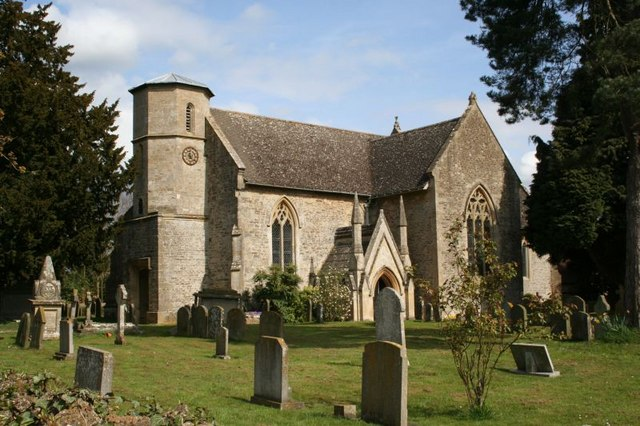
- St. Nicholas' parish church

- Location within Oxfordshire
- Population: 540 (parish, including Tubney) (2001 census)
- OS grid reference: SU4298
- Civil parish: Fyfield and Tubney
- District: Vale of White Horse
- Shire county: Oxfordshire
- Region: South East
- Country: England
- Sovereign state: United Kingdom
- Post town: Abingdon
- Postcode district: OX13
- Dialling code: 01865
- Police: Thames Valley
- Fire: Oxfordshire
- Ambulance: South Central
- UK Parliament: Wantage

Fyfield is a village in the civil parish of Fyfield and Tubney, in the Vale of White Horse district of Oxfordshire, England. It is about 4 1/2 miles (7 km) west of Abingdon-on-Thames. It was part of Berkshire until the 1974 boundary changes transferred it to Oxfordshire. The village used to be on the main A420 road between Oxford and Faringdon, but a bypass now carries the main road just south of the village.

== Toponym ==
Fyfield's toponym is derived from the Old English Fif Hide (10th century). It was spelt Fifhide from the 10th to the 16th century, but also Fivehide in the 11th century, Fifide from the 13th to the 15th century, Fifhede in the 15th century and Fighfield or Fyfylde in the 16th century.

== Administrative history ==
Fyfield was an ancient parish in the Ock hundred of Berkshire. In 1952 Fyfield was merged with the neighbouring parish of Tubney to create a new civil parish called Fyfield and Tubney. At the 1951 census (the last before the abolition of the parish), Fyfield had a population of 280. Fyfield and Tubney was one of the parishes transferred from Berkshire to Oxfordshire in 1974.

== Manor ==
There has been a manor of Fyfield since at least the 10th century. The Chronicle of Abingdon claims that in 956 King Eadwig granted his thegn Æthelnoth 13 manses of land there. In 968 King Edgar confirmed these 11 hides of land plus another 12 hides to the Benedictine Abingdon Abbey. After the Norman Conquest the manor was granted to Henry de Ferrers. In the 15th century the manor was held by John Golafre, and later by John, Earl of Lincoln who died in 1487. The manor then passed to the Crown. It was granted for life to Lady Catherine Gordon, the widow of the pretender Perkin Warbeck, who married Christopher Ashton and came to Fyfield in 1531. In 1554 the remainder was granted to Sir Thomas White, who gave it to his new foundation of St John's College, Oxford, which has held it ever since.

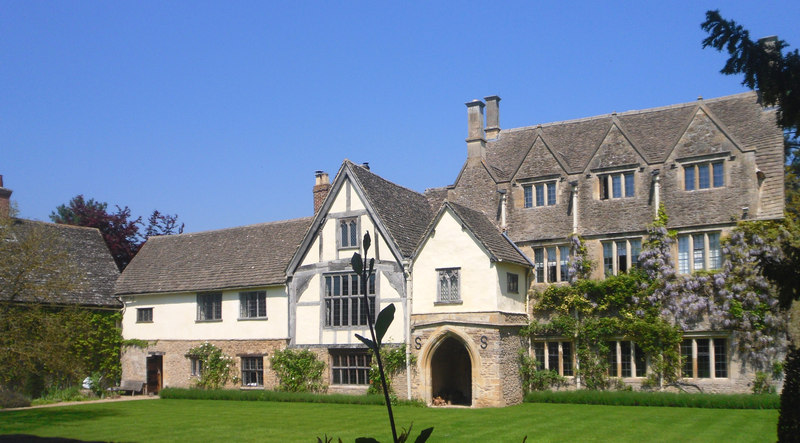
The Manor House

The present manor house was built in about 1320 or 1325 and enlarged in the Elizbethan era. It should not be confused with the nearby Manor Farmhouse, which was built in about 1700.

== Parish church ==
The Church of England parish church of St. Nicholas was originally a late 12th or early 13th century Norman building. It has a canonical sundial on the south wall. In the 14th century it was largely rebuilt with the addition of a north aisle and a south transept. The north arcade was rebuilt in the 15th century and the south porch was added in the 19th century, possibly designed by J.C. Buckler and built in 1867–68.

In 1893 a fire badly damaged the church and it was extensively restored thereafter. The octagonal upper stages of the bell tower were added in the restoration.

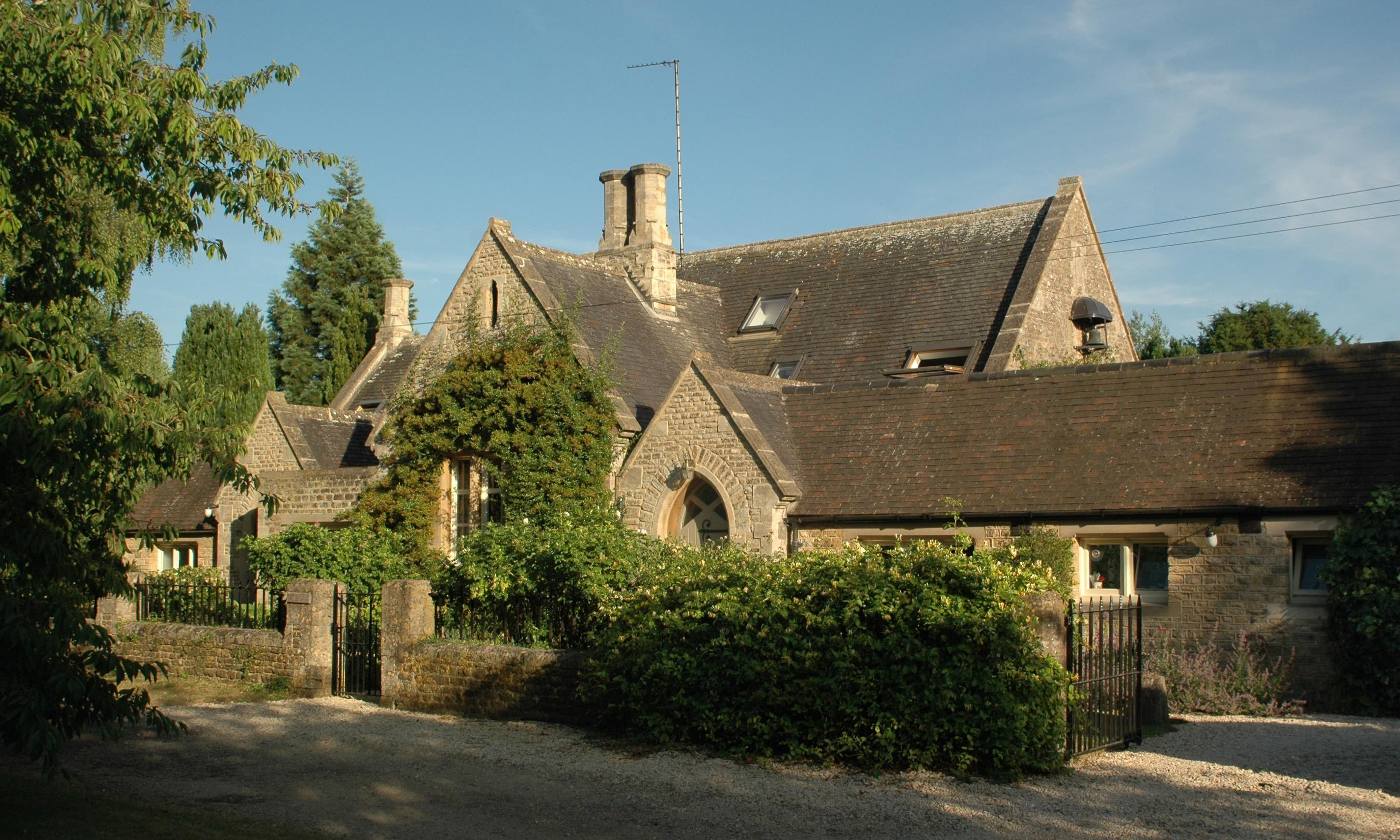
Former parish school, now a private house

A parish school was built opposite the church in 1873. It is now a private house.

== Amenities ==
The White Hart public house in the village was built in the 15th century by the executors of John Golafre (died 1442), who willed the foundation of a chantry. The building was either a hospital or almshouse serving a chantry in the parish church or was itself the chantry chapel with priest's house attached. St John's College, Oxford has owned the White Hart since 1580. In the 16th century the chantry was suppressed and its last chaplain, Thomas Clenson, was pensioned off.

Oxfordshire County Council subsidised bus route 63 between Oxford and Southmoor links Fyfield with Oxford on weekdays. From Monday to Friday there are five departures a day from Fyfield to Oxford, and three buses a day from Oxford to Fyfield. There is no service on Saturday, Sunday, or Bank Holidays. The current contractor operating the route is Thames Travel.

== Sources ==
- Ditchfield, PH; Page, William, eds. (1907). A History of the County of Berkshire. Victoria County History. Vol. II. London: Archibald Constable & Co. p. 94.
- Page, William; Ditchfield, PH, eds. (1924). A History of the County of Berkshire. Victoria County History. Vol. IV. assisted by John Hautenville Cope. London: The St Katherine Press. pp. 344–349.
- Pevsner, Nikolaus (1966). Berkshire. The Buildings of England. Harmondsworth: Penguin Books. pp. 145–146.
