= Tubney =

Village in Oxfordshire, England

Coordinates: 51.686°N 1.371°W

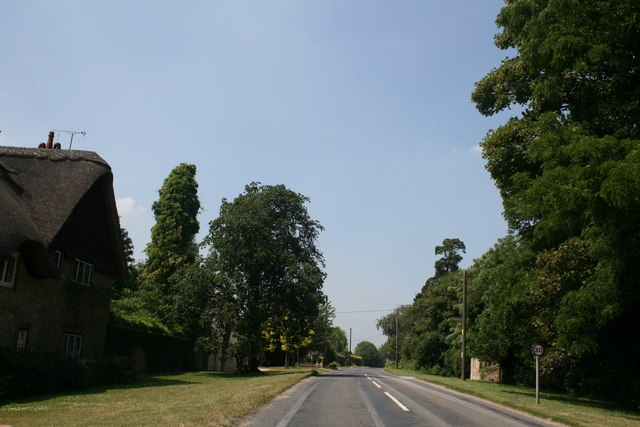

- Location within Oxfordshire
- OS grid reference: SU4399
- Civil parish: Fyfield and Tubney
- District: Vale of White Horse
- Shire county: Oxfordshire
- Region: South East
- Country: England
- Sovereign state: United Kingdom
- Post town: Abingdon
- Postcode district: OX13
- Dialling code: 01865
- Police: Thames Valley
- Fire: Oxfordshire
- Ambulance: South Central
- UK Parliament: Wantage

Tubney is a small village and in the civil parish of Fyfield and Tubney, in the Vale of White Horse district, in Oxfordshire, England (in Berkshire until 1974). It lies about 3 miles (5 km) west of Abingdon-on-Thames, just south of the A420 road from Oxford to Faringdon, 9 miles (14 km) southwest of Oxford.

== History ==
Tubney was first mentioned in 955, when it was included in land granted to Abingdon Abbey. The abbey retained the overlordship of the manor throughout the Middle Ages. In 1479, the manor was granted to William Waynflete, Bishop of Winchester, for the foundation of Magdalen College, his new college at Oxford. The college has retained the manor ever since. The medieval settlement was over a mile northeast of the modern village, near the village of Appleton. The medieval settlement was deserted by the 16th century. The site is marked by the remains of a medieval moat at Tubney Manor Farm.

Nothing remains of the medieval church, although its graveyard could still be seen in the early 20th century. Although there was no parish church, the parish had a parson, to whom Magdalen College was paying a stipend of £44 a year in the 17th century. In the 18th century it was reported that the incumbents were inducted under a hawthorn bush. The modern site of Tubney was settled from the 17th century.

Tubney was an ancient parish in the Ock hundred of Berkshire. In 1952 Tubney was merged with the neighbouring parish of Fyfield to create a new civil parish called Fyfield and Tubney. At the 1951 census (the last before the abolition of the parish), Tubney had a population of 215. Fyfield and Tubney was transferred from Berkshire to Oxfordshire in 1974.

== Notable buildings ==
Tubney House, a 17th-century Grade II listed building, is now the headquarters of the Wildlife Conservation Research Unit (WildCRU), part of the Department of Zoology at the University of Oxford.

A new church, designed by A. W. N. Pugin and dedicated to St Lawrence of Rome, was consecrated in 1847, with a font given by Queen Adelaide.
