= Fyfield and Tubney =

Coordinates: 51.6867°N 1.37866°W

- Civil parish
- Location within Oxfordshire
- Civil parish: Fyfield and Tubney
- District: Vale of White Horse
- Shire county: Oxfordshire
- Region: South East
- Country: England
- Sovereign state: United Kingdom
- Post town: Abingdon
- Postcode district: OX13
- Dialling code: 01865
- Police: Thames Valley
- Fire: Oxfordshire
- Ambulance: South Central
- UK Parliament: Witney

Fyfield and Tubney is a civil parish in The Vale of White Horse district of Oxfordshire, England. It includes the village of Fyfield which is about 4.5 miles (7 km) west of Abingdon and Tubney, which is about 4 miles (6 km) west of Abingdon. The parish was formed in 1952 when the parish of Fyfield was merged with the parish of Tubney. It was part of Berkshire until the 1974 boundary changes transferred it to Oxfordshire.
