= Nailstone =

Village in Leicestershire, England

Coordinates: 52.661°N 1.384°W

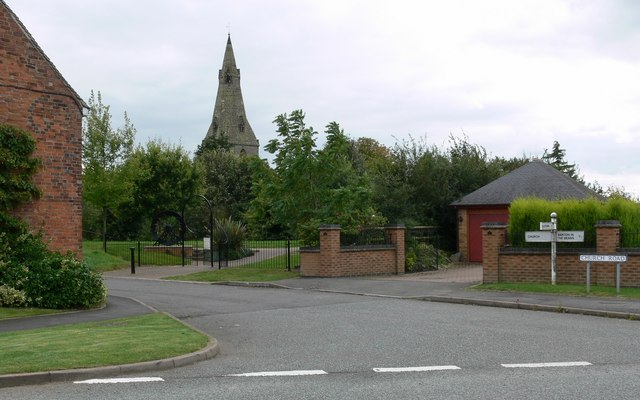
- A view of All Saints Church, Nailstone

- Location within Leicestershire
- Population: 514 (2011 Census)
- District: Hinckley and Bosworth
- Shire county: Leicestershire
- Region: East Midlands
- Country: England
- Sovereign state: United Kingdom
- Post town: NUNEATON
- Postcode district: CV13
- Dialling code: 01530
- Police: Leicestershire
- Fire: Leicestershire
- Ambulance: East Midlands
- UK Parliament: Hinckley and Bosworth

Nailstone is a village and civil parish in the Hinckley and Bosworth district of Leicestershire, England, situated to the west of Leicester and 3 miles (5 km) north-east of Market Bosworth. According to the 2001 census the parish had a population of 521, reducing slightly to 514 at the 2011 census. The village has a primary school: Dove Bank Primary School the catchment area for which also includes the neighbouring village of Bagworth.

Nailstone is a former Gopsall Estate village with several buildings of special interest and unique characteristics which are particular to the Gopsall Estate villages. The village also has historical links to the Jacobite rising of 1745 when, after his retreat from Derby, Charles Edward Stuart "Bonnie Prince Charlie" visited his friends the Knowles family in Nailstone. A great elm tree was planted in the village to commemorate this event.

Nailstone has had mining links since 1862 when the first Nailstone Colliery mineshaft was sunk. The colliery was closed in 1991 and the land was purchased to provide a logistics centre and country park

Nailstone became a conservation village in 2015.
