= Air Europe =

Airline of the United Kingdom (1979–1991)

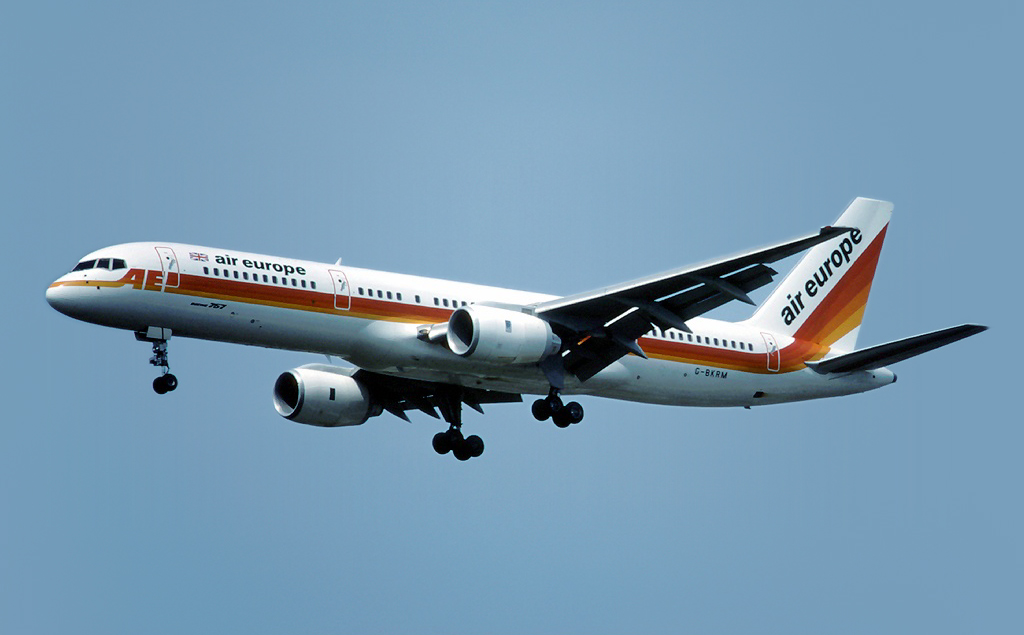
- Air Europe Boeing 757-200
IATA	ICAO	Call sign
AE	AOE	AIR EUROPE
- Founded: 1978 (as Inter European Airways)
- Commenced operations: 4 May 1979 (as Air Europe)
- Ceased operations: 8 March 1991
- Operating bases: Gatwick Airport, Manchester Airport
- Parent company: International Leisure Group
- Headquarters: Reigate, Surrey; Crawley, West Sussex
- Key people: Harry Goodman (chairman), Martin O'Reagan (CEO), Errol Cossey (CCO), Roy Phillips (engineering), Geraldine Bufton (office services), Geraldine Constable (cabin services)

Air Europe was a wholly privately-owned and independent (Note: Independent from government-owned corporations.) British airline, established in 1978 under the working title Inter European Airways. It adopted the Air Europe name in the following year. Its head office was in England, firstly in Reigate, Surrey, then in Crawley, West Sussex.

Its main operating base was at London Gatwick Airport, where it commenced commercial airline operations in May 1979 with three brand-new Boeing 737-200 Advanced jet aircraft.

Air Europe was the brainchild of Errol Cossey and Martin O'Regan, two former Dan-Air executivesand Harry Goodman, who had founded Intasun Leisure during the early 1970s. Goodman became the airline's main private financial backer and, in so doing, expanded his role as chairman of the International Leisure Group (ILG), the parent company of both companies.

The airline was the main supplier of charter seats to Intasun Leisure, which grew during the 1980s to become the UK's second-largest package tour operator (after the market leader Thomson).

Air Europe expanded during the 1980s with a major scheduled presence on short-haul European trunk routes taking off and landing at London Gatwick. Towards the end of the decade it became the first non-state incepted airline to become pan-European, setting up subsidiaries elsewhere in Europe and acquiring two small airlines to form the nucleus of a new Air Europe Express regional airline subsidiary. The acquired slots at Gatwick enabled it to increase frequencies as well as launch new scheduled routes. By the end of the decade it had become Gatwick's largest resident airline operator.

Air Europe's success came to an end from late 1989 onwards, when the cost of borrowing rose (to the detriment of highly debt-leveraged companies) and financial problems beset its parent company. ILG and its UK-based subsidiaries – including Air Europe – went bankrupt on 8 March 1991.

== History ==
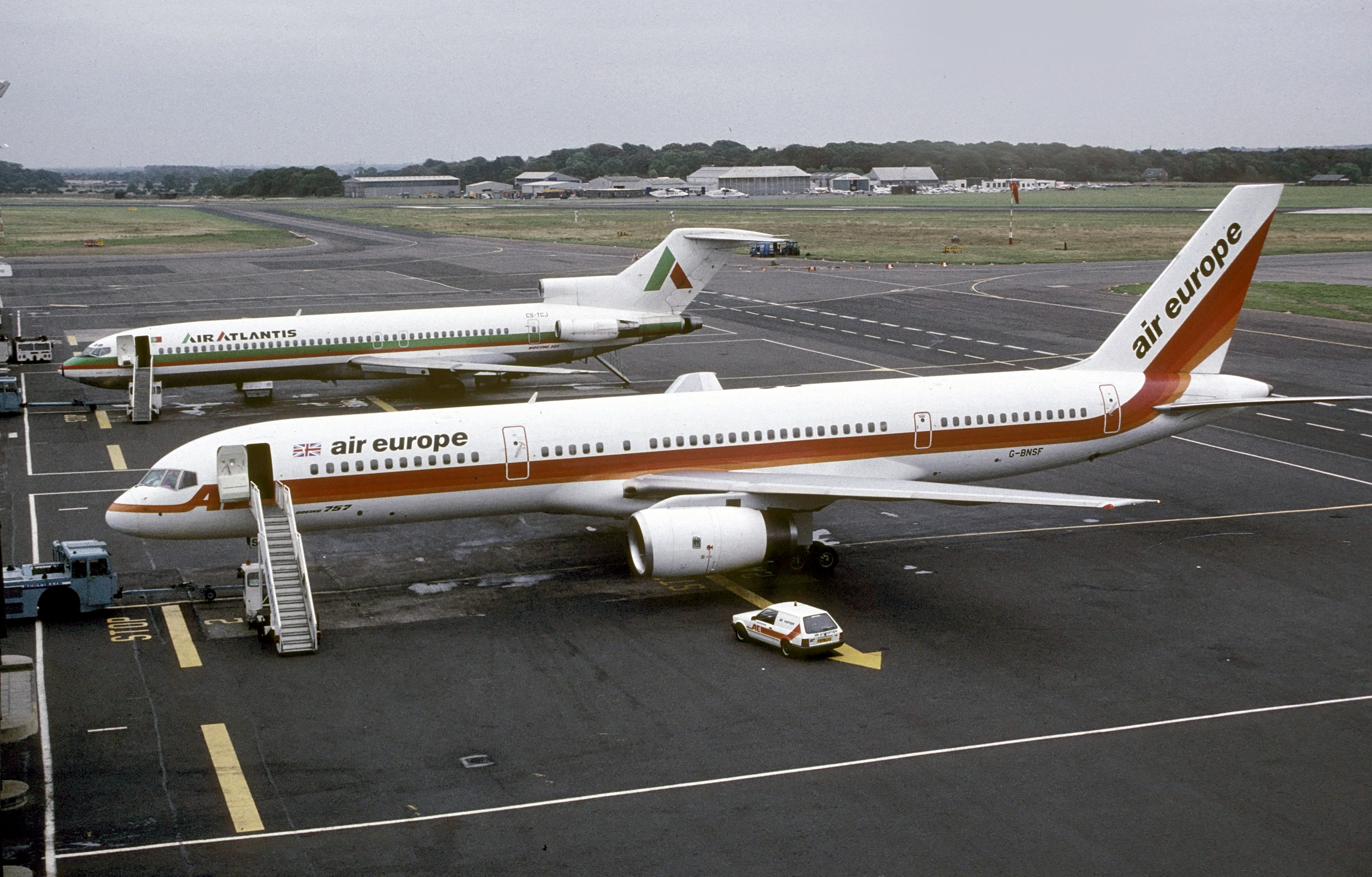
An Air Europe Boeing 757-200 at Newcastle Airport in the 1980s

=== Background to formation ===
Since its beginning in the 1950s, the UK package tour industry has been characterised by its cyclic trade (with pronounced periods of growth and contraction).

The first two periods of major growth had occurred during the mid-1960s and early 70s, respectively. These were followed by a period of major contraction during the mid-70s, mainly as a result of the 1973 oil crisis; this, in turn, was followed by renewed expansion during the second half of the 1970s.

The industry's spurt of growth in the late 1970s was accompanied by a growing shortage of whole-plane charter seats, which was further exacerbated by Laker Airways' decision to curb its short- to medium-haul charter activities, as a result of that airline's increasing focus on its long-haul, transatlantic Skytrain scheduled no frills services, as well as by British Caledonian's decision to withdraw completely from the market.

Therefore, a regional niche market opportunity arose specialising in short-haul.

==== Radical departure from established practices in the charter airline industry ====
During his time as Dan-Air's associate director in charge of the airline's operations, Errol Cossey oversaw the successful introduction of new jet aircraft types into Dan-Air's fleet, beginning with the de Havilland Comet series 4 in 1966 and continuing with the BAC One-Eleven 400 series in 1969, the Boeing 707-320 in 1971, the Boeing 727-100 in 1973 as well as the BAC One-Eleven 500 in 1975. He assumed control over the charter fleet, numbering 28 aircraft during the mid-1970s. At that time, Intasun contracted a growing share of its business to Dan-Air. Intasun, like Dan-Air at that time, was shunned by doubtful writers as 'no frills'. It was mainly competing on price with the other tour operators, notably market leader Thomson Holidays.

A factor behind Air Europe's undercutting of prices while continuing to expand profitably was that it first waited for all the other operators to place their business with Dan-Air and only then placed its contracts, fitting in with whenever aircraft and crews were available. This meant that a lot of Intasun's business involved mid-week and night flying. This, in turn, was a win-win for both operator and airline. It enabled Intasun to charter aircraft at substantially lower rates than its competitors, who had to pay a premium for chartering planes at weekend peak times and it permitted Dan-Air to increase its fleet's utilisation, thereby boosting the company's overall profitability. However, the high fuel consumption of Dan-Air's "mix'n match" fleet – especially the Comets, which at that time made up the bulk of its charter fleet – against the backdrop of steeply rising jet fuel prices in the aftermath of the 1973 oil crisis made it more and more difficult to offer Intasun the rates at which it was prepared to contract its business to Dan-Air.

Errol Cossey became convinced that he could offer Intasun these rates without difficulty, and do a lot more business with it, if Dan-Air had more modern aircraft with a substantially lower fuel-burn and overall lower direct operating costs in its fleet. He was also aware that Britannia Airways, Thomson Holidays' sister airline and Dan-Air's main rival in the charter market, had already begun building up a fleet of brand-new Boeing 737-200 jet planes, which had lower operating costs and a better operational performance than the older, second-hand jets operated by Dan-Air.

Therefore, Errol Cossey, Martin O'Regan, (Note: The group finance director of Dan-Air parent Davies and Newman.) and Alan Snudden, Dan-Air's managing director, tried to convince Fred Newman, Davies and Newman's majority shareholder as well as Dan-Air's long-serving chairman, that operating a brand-new fleet of Boeing 737-200 Advanced series jet aircraft – at the time the very latest, state-of-the-art aircraft – was the only way to secure Dan-Air's long-term future as a major player in the charter airline industry. Their argument to Fred Newman was that operating the latest series 200 Advanced model of the Boeing 737 would not only give Dan-Air far better cost figures than any of the existing aircraft types in its fleet but would also allow it to leap-frog Britannia, which initially operated only the basic 200 model of the 737. That model lacked important enhancements, such as a short-field capability enabling operations at airfields whose runways were too short for the basic 737-200 model.

After failed attempts to convince Fred Newman of their plan's merits, Errol Cossey, Martin O'Regan and Alan Snudden decided to leave Dan-Air.

Cossey presented the plan forged with O'Regan and Snudden. Goodman agreed to support it as an equity holder. This was the point at which Air Europe was incorporated; however, Snudden decided to join Monarch Airlines.)

The fact that the charter airline industry—Dan-Air in particular—were shunned by some travel companies meant broad appeal was needed at the outset, especially in terms of on-board service, including the in-flight catering. Standards were set to rival the leading scheduled service airlines, with an aim of establishing a new benchmark for the industry and for charter airlines in particular; this would enable the new airline to fly longer seasons as travel companies were expected to cancel their contracts with rival airlines—an increase in aircraft utilisation that would translate into higher profits.

One of the ways in which the new airline was planning to set a standard for high-quality in-flight service was by completely revamping the seat-back catering practised by most contemporary charter airlines. At the time, this consisted of serving spam salad on all flights out and sandwiches back. This seemed to be a low-cost way of minimal catering on inclusive tours but was labour-intensive especially when taking into account that these meals needed to be prepared freshly several hours before departure. Caterers were charging for fresh preparation and seasonal produce. However, the salad leaves tended to wilt and the sandwiches acquired quickly staled due to the dry atmosphere inside an aircraft cabin. As a result, many passengers disliked the food. Thus Air Europe resolved to serve proper, restaurant-style meals including at least three courses – a starter, a hot main course and a dessert — on all flights, time permitting. This saw bulk-purchase of deep-frozen ingredients only to take advantage of lower rates. Eschewing inbound local catering, the frozen food could stay in the aircraft's holds, which would generally not be filled to capacity. Other than operating only brand-new aircraft from the very beginning, this was a second unique selling point.

Improving profitability in a very competitive marketplace characterised by low profit margins and excess capacity were not the only reasons for exclusively using brand-new equipment – generous capital allowances for new equipment reduced tax liability, thereby increasing the enterprise value.

Legal affiliation to a tour operator (Intasun) gave indirect access to customers' deposits for use as working capital. This was of particular importance to reduce market barriers – the first plane had not yet arrived but it could meet up-front expenses. Also many suppliers would have to be paid in February – the dead season – before the summer flying programme commenced in April.

To attract higher-margin business from upmarket tour operators Air Europe was chosen from a short-list, which aimed to distance Air Europe from Intasun.

==== Long-term strategic planning instead of opportunistic growth ====
Cossey and O'Regan consciously rejected a second-hand fleet, variable food and ephemeral expansion: from the late 1940s until the early 1960s a short-termist approach was typical for new independent airlines, being critical of the undercutting, opportunistic risks taken by Dan-Air, an airline that became highly diversified – many of its sectors never turned a profit. This weakness overwhelmed its management with activities that were seeing a negative return on investment. Dan-Air justified a diversification strategy by its low marginal cost as aircraft and crews were already available. For many years for Dan-Air each aircraft type represented a "cost centre line" that was financially accountable for itself.

A typical example of Dan-Air's opportunistic diversification into activities was its long-term commitment to start a comprehensive network of regional scheduled services linking secondary airports across Europe, many of which operated on a seasonal basis only. This took up massive resources – financial and managerial. It never became a financial success.

Cossey and O'Regan therefore honed in on low-risk activities, specifically few but core activities.

Their long-term strategic plan was to penetrate the market for:

- Short-/medium-haul charter flights
- Long-haul charter flights
- Scheduled services serving markets where half of the available capacity could be profitably filled with Intasun customers
- Air Europe branded airlines in other European countries.

A particular financial strength was:

- Favourable finance leases of new aircraft allowing it to take on more debt (such as further leases) against their fixed residual dollar valuations.

=== Beginning ===
Air Europe became the first British charter airline to use new equipment from the outset and provide food and service that were reviewed to be comparable to established scheduled carriers.

Due to the package tour industry's seasonality, Air Europe needed to ensure that it had high capacity through the entire June–September peak season: the airline needed to have finance in place to pay up-front for the deposits to take over the delivery slots of three brand-new Boeing 737-200 Advanced aircraft that had originally been booked by another airline that been forced to cancel its order. Financing these aircraft, which were due to roll off Boeing's production line during May 1979, was its biggest challenge of that year.

In the late 1970s major financiers were reluctant to provide start-up capital to newly constituted airlines (dubbed 'paper') unless part of or enjoyed the backing of well-financed organisations. Their reluctance was based on a decade-long high failure rate of UK airline ventures. Therefore, Air Europe's promoters were compelled to approach non-UK institutions, lenders and venture capitalists.

Ultimately, C. ITOH and the Marubeni Corporation, two Japanese conglomerates, whose commercial activities included purchasing brand-new aircraft from the United States and leasing them on to non-US airlines as part of Japan's effort to reduce the then huge trade imbalance with the US, were prepared to lend Air Europe the required amount, following complex and lengthy negotiations. The type of aircraft finance Air Europe procured from C. ITOH and Marubeni was known as "Samurai" leasing. It consisted of a combination of full repayment mortgage and partial repayment (hire purchase) finance spread over ten years for each aircraft. Boeing provided their deficiency guarantees underwriting greatly the Japanese financiers' outstanding loans (equal to fair depreciated resale values).

Air Europe's first commercial air service was on 4 May 1979, with a brand-new, 130-seat Boeing 737-2S3 Advanced, named Adam (registration G-BMHG) flying London Gatwick to Palma de Mallorca with a full passenger load, flight KS 1004. The second plane was delivered to Gatwick that day. The last of the batch of the three arrived, post-testing, likewise on 31 May 1979, in time for the start of the peak operating season.

Air Europe became the first new UK charter airline to be profitable during its first year of operation.

=== Becoming a major player in the charter airline industry ===
The first year's success instilled stakeholder confidence and gave a financial platform.

Air Europe opened its second base at Manchester Airport in the autumn of 1979 and became its fastest-growing UK departure point over the next few years.

A major reorganisation was completed in 1981 when Intasun became a unified company, leading to its first flotation as Intasun Leisure Group plc on the London Stock Exchange's then Unlisted Securities Market. In 1987, the group, which by then had become the International Leisure Group (ILG), delisted from the LSE.)

A third base opened at Cardiff Airport in 1982 when Air Europe's core fleet consisted of seven from-new Boeing 737-200 Advanced aircraft. A further three operated under a swap-lease arrangement with Air Florida between May and September. Air Europe expected to carry 1.2 million passengers during 1982.

In 1982, Air Europe:

- took over the purchase agreement of British Airways for a pair of brand-new Boeing 757-200 aircraft to arrive 1983 and 1984. These were among 19 the UK 'flag carrier' had placed with Boeing prior to starting BA's privatisation process which as such had become surplus to its strict requirements.
- ordered five Boeing 737-300s but with deliveries from 1987.

Intasun Leisure Group plc's annual results for the financial year to the end of March 1983 were released in August. These results showed that the group's pre-tax profit for that period was £6.8 million (up 26% on the year before, namely as the travel operator alone) and that the group carried 1.26 million passengers, most of whom by Air Europe. Air Europe accounted for half of the profit.

Air Europe's first Boeing 757 named Fiona (registration G-BKRM) operated its maiden commercial flight on 24 April 1983, between Gatwick and Faro. The airline's second Boeing 757 (G-BPGW) entered commercial service on 29 March 1984, between Gatwick and Milan. An order for a third, the first directly ordered from Boeing, followed in 1984 and further such aeroplanes operated.

During the early 1980s, the Federal Aviation Administration (FAA) began rethinking its policy on the minimum number of engines an aircraft needed to be permitted to fly long distances non-stop over water. The FAA's rethink had been prompted by the increasing reliability of jet engines powering new widebodied airliners as well as other technological advances. Mid-air engine shutdowns that necessitated an emergency landing at the nearest diversion airfield and which could harm the structure and/or occupants had become a rare phenomenon. The result was ETOPS, a set of rules permitting twin-engined aircraft to fly long over water routes, provided that there were usable diversion airfields within 120 minutes' non-stop flying distance plus a 15% margin from the aircraft's route.

Following the introduction of the new rules in the mid-1980s, Air Europe became one of the first airlines to have its 757s ETOPS-equipped to take advantage of the aircraft's design range, which was sufficient to permit non-stop flights to the East coast of North America, the Caribbean and Central America as well as certain parts of South America and Asia.

This enabled Air Europe to become the first British charter airline to operate its 757s on transatlantic charter flights between various points in the UK and Orlando, Florida, from 1989.

The first three planes were sold in April 1985, when the company cashed in on their dollar-denominated residual values. The contractual ability to sell in this way meant keeping the fleet young with a policy or replacing planes whenever residual values happened to exceed the costs of leasing new replacements, such as capacity temporarily leased in from other operators.)

Air Europe placed an initial order for five, larger 400-series Boeing 737s. These aircraft were delivered during 1989.

ILG's 1989 annual report, which covered financial and operational performance during Air Europe's tenth anniversary had summary statistics:

- Group operating profit of £35.5 million
- 31 jet aircraft operated across the group
- 20 scheduled routes
- Total surplus aircraft valuations of £360 million
- A combined share of 20% of all slots at London Gatwick
- Total passenger numbers for all the group's airlines of 5.8 million
- Total passenger numbers for all the group's tour operators of 2.7 million.

Each of these was a record for these benchmarks.

=== Aircraft leasing ===
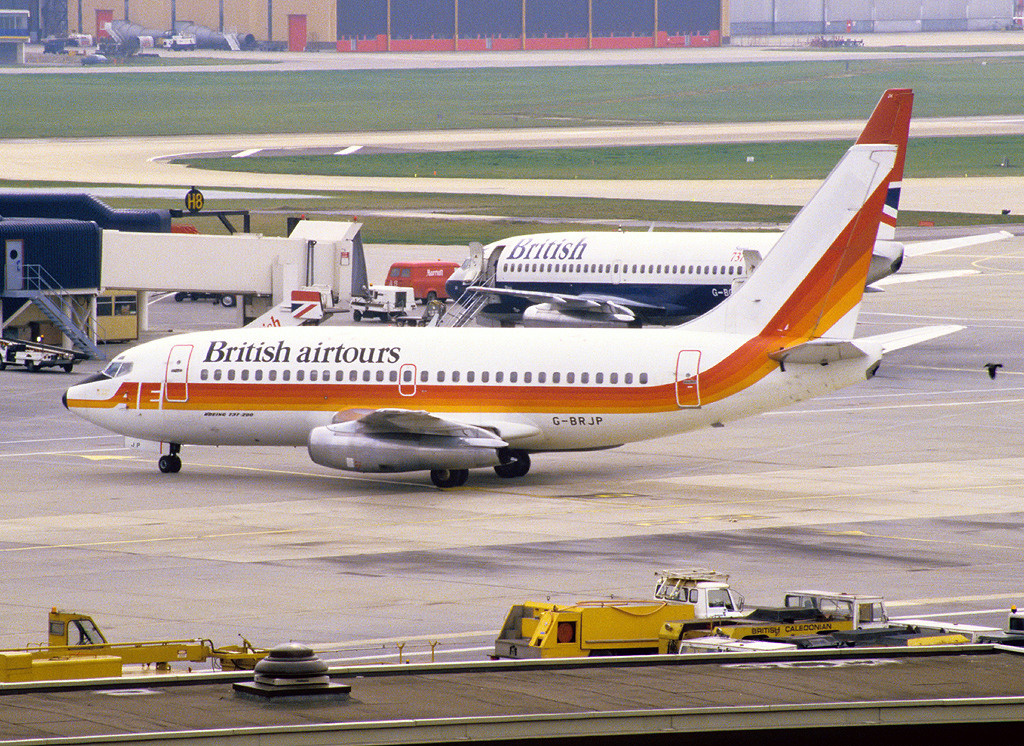
An Air Europe Boeing 737-2S3 Adv leased to British Airtours under the early-to mid-1980s AE–BA aircraft swap lease at Gatwick Airport in March 1984

Air Europe frequently used day-to-day operating leases as well as finance leases.

The former includes long-term swaps of surplus capacity with other airlines whose seasonality was opposite to Air Europe's as well as short-term leases for temporary capacity shortfalls.

The latter is an efficient secured finance method to pay for aircraft, whereby these aircraft are sold to related or external lessors from whom they are then leased back, with the airline retaining a substantial interest in the aircraft's residual values.

The charter airline business was highly seasonal, with most of the annual commercial activity taking place over a relatively short period of barely four months between the end of May and the beginning of September. As Air Europe was operating a fleet of brand-new aircraft that incurred high financing charges unlike the older, second-hand jets operated by Dan-Air and many other rival airlines, it could not afford to kerb its fleet utilisation over the winter months. Dan-Air, by contrast for example took half of its operational Comet fleet out of service at the end of the 1976 summer season and put the aircraft into storage at Dan-Air Engineering's main base at Lasham Airfield the following winter season and saw reduced use of other aircraft in the winter. Dan-Air was able to do this as these predominantly older, second-hand aircraft had much lower acquisition costs and were already largely or fully depreciated at the time they entered its fleet.

Air Europe therefore sought business partners whose seasonality was counter-cyclical to its own so that its surplus aircraft could be leased out to other operators in winter and those operators' surplus capacity could be leased in for the busy summer period. Air Europe agreed an aircraft lease-swap with Air Florida, which commenced at the start of the 1980/81 winter season. Under this deal, Air Europe leased three of its aircraft to Air Florida to cover that airline's peak season, which occurred in winter. In return, Air Florida leased two of its aircraft to Air Europe to cover the UK airline's summer peak period. The number of aircraft Air Europe leased from Air Florida during the summer months subsequently increased to three.

Although this arrangement initially worked to both airlines' satisfaction, Air Europe decided to terminate it at the end of the 1982/83 winter season due to Air Florida's growing financial problems such as paying its rent on time. Further not all aircraft returned to the UK on time along with the aircraft Air Florida was contractually obliged to supply from its own fleet at the start of the UK carrier's summer season.)

Air Europe replaced the defunct deal with a similar arrangement with British Airways, which it had negotiated with the UK flag carrier in 1982. (This was part of a wider deal that had resulted in Air Europe purchasing two brand-new Boeing 757s from British Airways (BA).)

The Air Europe—BA aircraft swap lease involved BA leasing back the two 757s it had sold to Air Europe along with a number of that airline's 737s to cover the shortfall resulting from aircraft being taken out of service during the winter when BA's scheduled maintenance occurred. This deal lasted from 1983 until 1986.

An example for a short-term lease to bridge a capacity shortfall was Air Europe's intended lease of a pair of Boeing 747s to enable the launch of a new long-haul charter programme in 1989.

The launch of this programme in May 1989 necessitated the temporary lease of suitable wide-body aircraft capacity, as Air Europe did not have any aircraft suited to this type of operation in its fleet. The original intention was to lease two 460-seat Boeing 747s.

In the event, Air Europe leased a single, 486-seat Boeing 747 from US carrier Tower Air to operate its long-haul charter services to Bangkok, Barbados, Orlando and Acapulco on an ACMI basis.

=== Pan-European presence ===
Further expansion and diversification occurred between 1986 and 1989.

It began with the creation of a Spanish subsidiary, Air España S.A., based at Palma de Mallorca, in which ILG acquired a 25% stake, the maximum foreign entities or individuals could legally own in a Spanish airline at the time. This was followed by the acquisition of a 49% stake in German regional carrier Nürnberger Flugdienst (NFD), the purchase of a 33% stake in Norwegian charter carrier Norway Airlines and the creation of a new Italian carrier, Air Europe SpA, in which ILG held a 35% stake.

With the exception of Air España, which traded as Air Europa, all the other airlines traded as Air Europe. All of their aircraft – including those operated by Air Europa – adopted Air Europe's livery. The only way to tell the aircraft apart, other than by their respective national registrations, was to look at the national flag following the Air Europe/Air Europa name on the upper white part of the fuselage.

ILG eventually created Dutch-incorporated Airlines of Europe BV as a joint management and holding company for all of these airlines.

ILG's move to seek a pan-European presence, including the Spanish market, the most important destination market for its charter operations from the UK, was not only driven by its desire to take advantage of new business opportunities resulting from the gradual liberalisation of Europe's air transport market. Another important factor leading to this decision was to ensure the widest possible UK coverage for its package tour operations to enable Intasun to compete better with market leader Thomson. ILG wanted to be able to do this without incurring the additional expense of stationing aircraft and crews at regional UK airports to operate a small number of seasonal flights only or, alternatively, incurring the cost of operating empty legs with aircraft repositioned from its two main bases at Gatwick and Manchester.

This resulted in an arrangement whereby Air Europa's aircraft were flying German and Scandinavian holidaymakers during daytime and Intasun's regional customers at night. The resulting higher aircraft utilisation and lower direct operating costs for Air Europa compared with Thomson sister company Britannia Airways, the UK's leading charter airline and Air Europe's greater competitor in the European charter market, in turn enabled Intasun to undercut Thomson's prices.

=== Scheduled services ===
Air Europe took its first tentative steps to become a scheduled-service airline in 1980, its second year of operation. However, the attempt failed.

Low-frequency scheduled services on selected leisure routes to destinations already served by Air Europe's charter operation did eventually commence in 1985.

City-pair scheduled services plying the major international European trunk routes from Air Europe's Gatwick base began in 1987.

As part of a major scheduled service expansion, Air Europe launched a new business class in 1988. This was accompanied by an increase in frequencies on most of its scheduled European trunk routes. It also introduced a new scheduled service aircraft type from late 1989.

At that time, work started on licence applications for several long-haul scheduled services.

==== Abortive attempt to go long-haul ====
Air Europe prepared to enter the scheduled service market as early as April 1980 when it applied to the Civil Aviation Authority (CAA) for a licence to begin a year-round scheduled operation between London Gatwick and Miami, challenging Laker Airways' rival application to become the UK's second designated flag carrier on the route in direct competition with Air Florida as well as in indirect competition with British Airways' and Pan Am's services from Heathrow. The service was to commence at a frequency of five weekly return flights in summer and four weekly round-trips in winter. Air Europe proposed operating the service either with a McDonnell-Douglas DC-10 30 series widebodied trijet or a Rolls-Royce RB211-powered Boeing 747-200B. Air Europe had already reserved delivery positions with both manufacturers. In support of its application, the airline stressed that any spare capacity would be filled with its tour operator affiliates' customers. It hoped that this would convince the CAA of the proposed operation's viability on a year-round basis, especially during off-peak periods.

In the event, the CAA rejected Air Europe's application. It argued that the airline was still in its infancy as this was only its second year of operation and, therefore, lacked the expertise to take on three competitors on a major, intercontinental long-haul scheduled service route.

==== Launching low-frequency services on leisure routes ====
Air Europe's first successful scheduled route launch occurred on 2 May 1985. On that day, the airline launched a four-times weekly scheduled service between London Gatwick and Palma de Mallorca. This was followed by further scheduled route launches between Gatwick and Gibraltar, as well as Manchester and Gibraltar in November 1985 and November 1986, respectively.

These route launches were part of Air Europe's initial scheduled service strategy to operate low-frequency services on selected leisure routes to destinations already served by Air Europe's charter operation.

==== Taking on flag carriers ====
The gradual liberalisation of the regulatory framework governing the airline industry in Europe from December 1987 provided the legal basis for Air Europe to become the first wholly private airline to take advantage of the new relaxed policies regarding the operation of fully fledged scheduled services on major European trunk routes in direct competition with the established flag carriers.

Air Europe considered itself well-placed to take advantage of the new scheduled service opportunities that became available to independent airlines as a result of the gradual liberalisation of the European air transport market. It enjoyed substantially lower operating costs than the established flag carriers because of its much higher aircraft utilisation and labour productivity. This meant that the airline could afford to undercut its rivals' business class fares by about 10–15% on each route where it competed with them.

This, in turn, provided the impetus for the formulation of a new scheduled service strategy, which was internally known as the New European Airline Project (NEAP). The new strategy centred on Air Europe providing competitively priced and timed scheduled services on the eleven busiest international European trunk routes from its Gatwick base. The first batch of services was to be inaugurated with four brand-new Boeing 737-300s Air Europe had then on order, in a single-class, high-density configuration, at a frequency of two round-trips per day. All flights were to offer a full on-board service.

The early morning outbound service from Gatwick was to be the earliest flight of the day from any London airport to each of the destinations to be served. The late evening inbound service to Gatwick was to be the last flight of the day to any London airport. Air Europe hoped that offering the first flight out as well as the last flight back would strengthen its competitive position vis-à-vis its rivals by giving passengers a longer day, thereby helping them to cut down on overseas accommodation costs.

Other important reasons for choosing these departure and arrival times at Gatwick for Air Europe's proposed network of short-haul, international European scheduled services were the availability of slots at an increasingly congested Gatwick and the in-built bias in travel agents' computer reservation systems.

The former meant that the only competitively timed slots that were then available at Gatwick due to the airport's tight slot situation were early morning and late evening slots.

Operating the first flight of the day displayed that flight at the very top of a travel agent's VDU screen. This automatically accorded it the highest priority among all the flights listed on the agent's screen and, therefore, made it more likely to be booked in a typical travel agency's high-pressured work environment.

Air Europe submitted its application to launch scheduled services from Gatwick to Paris, Amsterdam, Brussels, Frankfurt, Munich, Zürich, Geneva, Rome, Oslo, Stockholm and Copenhagen to the CAA in November 1986. It requested the CAA to approve its application in time for a spring 1987 launch.

Eventually, services commenced in December 1987 to Munich, followed by Paris-Charles de Gaulle in February 1988 and Brussels in April 1988.

==== Establishing a regional airline operation ====
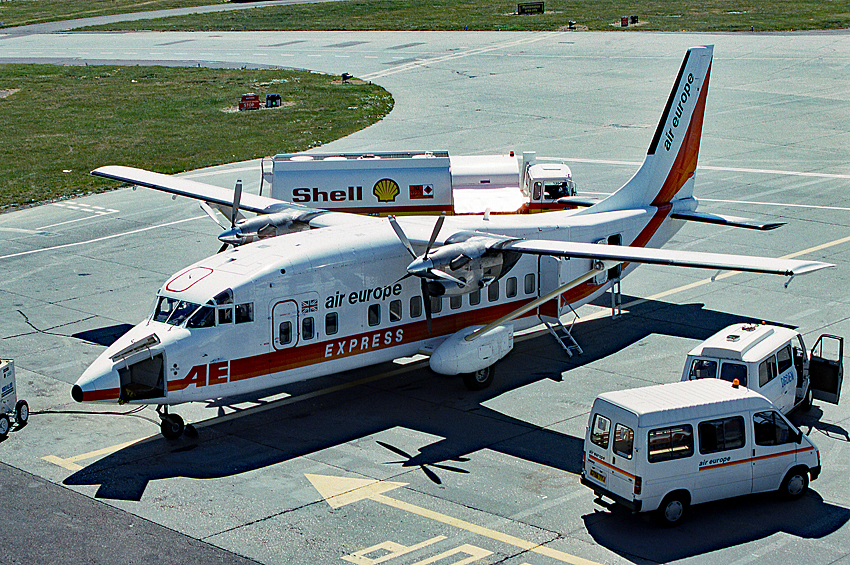
G-BNDI Air Europe Express Short 360 at Gatwick in 1990

In June 1988, ILG took over Connectair, a small, Gatwick-based regional airline. Following that airline's acquisition by ILG, Connectair was rebranded Air Europe Express and adopted a new corporate identity as of 1 February 1989.

ILG's decision to purchase Connectair was part of Air Europe's corporate strategy at the time to establish itself as a major short-haul scheduled operator at its Gatwick base. Gatwick had become very busy during the late 1980s. This meant that the much-coveted early-morning peak time slots, which Air Europe needed to be able to operate at times that were attractive to business travellers as well as competitive with its rivals' departure and arrival times, were in increasingly short supply. Connectair held a fairly large number of conveniently timed slots at Gatwick. ILG's acquisition of Connectair therefore represented a golden opportunity to substantially increase the number of slots the group's airlines controlled at Gatwick, thereby strengthening Air Europe's competitive position at that airport.

Air Europe Express flew under the same AE airline designator as its bigger sister airline.

Its scheduled services initially linked Gatwick with Antwerp, Düsseldorf and Rotterdam.

Larger Shorts 360s gradually replaced the Shorts 330s.

In April 1989, ILG purchased Guernsey Airlines, another small, independent regional airline, which operated scheduled services between Guernsey and Gatwick as well as between Guernsey and Manchester at the time. On 29 October 1989, ILG fully integrated Guernsey Airlines into Air Europe Express.

These moves provided Air Europe with additional transfer traffic for its developing short-haul European scheduled route network. They also enabled Air Europe to launch new routes where there was insufficient traffic to support its larger Boeing 737 and Fokker 100 jet aircraft or where these aircraft were too big to provide a frequent schedule during the start-up phase, such as Gatwick—Düsseldorf.

Following the replacement of the Air Europe Express Shorts 360 turboprops with Air Europe's larger and faster Fokker 100 jets on the Gatwick—Düsseldorf route, Air Europe Express launched a new thrice-daily Gatwick—Birmingham schedule with its Shorts 360s.

During the year ending August 1990, the Air Europe Express operation carried more than a quarter of a million passengers across its route network for the first time.

Air Europe Express was forced to halt its operations on 8 March 1991, along with its sister airlines in the ILG-controlled Airlines of Europe group as a result of its parent company's decision to put all the group's companies into administrative receivership on that day, even though Air Europe Express itself had remained profitable throughout that period.

Following the receivership of ILG, the Air Europe Express operation was bought from the receivers by the original management of Connectair, who restarted operations as Euroworld Airways in May 1991. Euroworld was later renamed CityFlyer Express, which became a franchisee of British Airways in June 1993 and was eventually acquired by British Airways in 1999.

==== Introducing a new aircraft type to compete on frequency as well as price ====
In early 1988, Air Europe began evaluating several aircraft types that had a lower seat capacity as well as lower direct operating costs per round-trip than the airline's Boeing 737-300/400s to enable it to penetrate the high-yield business travel market more effectively with a tailor-made product. Operating a fleet of dedicated, lower capacity scheduled aircraft with lower trip costs in a lower density configuration at higher frequencies on the main short-haul European trunk routes from Gatwick had the potential to attract a far greater share of the highly profitable business travel market, thereby transforming the financial performance of the scheduled routes.

At the same time, Air Europe decided that it would also need to launch a separate business class cabin on all scheduled routes that had the potential to attract a large number of business travellers to penetrate this market segment effectively and to maximise its profit potential. This led to the launch of a new business class on 24 October 1988, culminating in the refurbishment of seven aircraft and the kitting out of 800 staff with new uniforms.

At the end of a detailed performance evaluation of an updated, re-engined, Rolls-Royce Tay-powered version of the original BAC One-Eleven 500 featuring a 1990s style glass cockpit, the BAe 146-300 and the Fokker F100, Air Europe decided to place an order for eleven RR Tay-powered F100s, including an option on a further eleven aircraft, in March 1988. Deliveries of the aircraft on firm order were to begin in late 1990. Air Europe primarily chose the F100 as its main scheduled aircraft to ply its business routes because it promised 25% lower trip costs than the 737-300/400. (It rejected both rival contenders because these had revealed serious range/payload shortcomings during the evaluation process.)

A subsequent change in KLM's short-haul fleet requirements unexpectedly released four F100s from an order that airline had originally placed with Fokker. This enabled Air Europe to lease these aircraft, thereby bringing forward the date of the F100s introduction into its fleet by a year.

Air Europe's inaugural commercial F100 service departed Gatwick for Brussels on 4 December 1989.

The F100s introduction enabled Air Europe to increase frequencies to a minimum of three daily round-trips on most of the routes the aircraft served. (Higher frequencies were eventually offered on the Gatwick—Charles de Gaulle and Gatwick—Brussels routes following British Airways' release of slots formerly held by British Caledonian, as part of a deal to permit it to take over its erstwhile competitor.)

The F100s introduction also enabled Air Europe to introduce "main line" jet services between Gatwick and Jersey, following British Airways' withdrawal from what had always been one of British Caledonian's few, genuinely profitable short-haul routes, as well as to replace the Air Europe Express service between Gatwick and Düsseldorf.

Furthermore, Air Europe's F100-operated scheduled services showed excellent load factors and enabled each new route launched with that aircraft to become profitable within three months.

=== Ordering a new long-haul fleet and other aircraft commitments ===
Air Europe decided to become the launch customer for the Rolls-Royce Trent-powered version of the McDonnell-Douglas MD-11 in late 1989 when it announced its intention to place a firm order for six aircraft and to take an option on a further twelve. The first of these aircraft was to be delivered in 1993.

The airline intended to use these aircraft to operate a mix of long-haul charter and scheduled services, thereby helping sister company Intasun to reduce its dependence on third party suppliers to provide it with long-haul capacity.

Work on licence applications to launch new, long-haul scheduled routes from London Gatwick to New York City, the Caribbean, Australia and New Zealand to be operated with the new MD-11s commenced during the autumn of 1989. However, these never reached the hearing stage.

In addition to the MD-11 order, Air Europe had outstanding orders for an additional 22 Boeing 757-200s, eight Boeing 737-400s as well as eleven Fokker F100s during that period.

In April 1990, Air Europe furthermore signed a MoU with Airbus for a firm order covering the delivery of 40 A320 200 series twin-engined, narrow-bodied aircraft for delivery between May 1995 and December 1998. (It also took options on another 40 aircraft, the deliveries of which would have stretched to November 2001 if confirmed.)

=== ILG's abortive attempts to take over British Caledonian Group ===
ILG launched its first takeover bid, which valued British Caledonian Group at £36 million, in May 1986. That bid materialised after several rounds of inconclusive talks exploring ways of combining the short-haul businesses of Air Europe and British Caledonian (BCal) in a new joint venture, which had taken place between ILG and British Caledonian Group since the end of 1985. At the time, BCal's senior management dismissed ILG's bid as "derisory" because it valued the entire British Caledonian Group's assets far below their minimum expectations.

ILG decided to launch a new counter bid for the entire British Caledonian Group at the end of July 1987, following British Airways' outright rejection of ILG chairman Harry Goodman's offer to purchase BCal's short-haul operation for a fair price and to merge that operation with the short-haul operations of ILG subsidiary Air Europe, in return for not having the proposed BA-BCal deal referred to the Monopolies and Mergers Commission (MMC).

Air Europe was concerned that a new entity combining BA and BCal had the power to destroy the UK's remaining independent airlines, especially with regard to their ability to compete with such a behemoth. At the time Air Europe had ambitions of its own to become a major short-haul scheduled operator. It was planning to launch eleven new routes from Gatwick to Europe, thereby replacing and enhancing the services BCal had provided. Given a combined BA-BCal's superior financial strength, considerably lower borrowing costs and far greater economies of scale, Air Europe's management felt that it would be imprudent to launch these new routes if it had to compete with BA out of Heathrow and Gatwick as well. Therefore, its parent ILG had decided to make a counter bid, which it hoped would either kill off BA's proposal to take over BCal lock, stock and barrel or result in it being referred to the MMC.

To enhance its credibility as a serious contender, Air Europe's bid contained a detailed proposal to return BCal to profitability by way of a reorganisation. This proposal had been prepared by a retired BA head of route planning whom ILG had specifically hired for this purpose. The proposal itself entailed separating BCal into four discrete businesses, each of which would have had its own management who would have been accountable for the performance of their own business unit. The businesses into which BCal was to be split included a long-haul operation using the existing BCal brand, a short-haul operation to be merged into Air Europe's existing short-haul operation using the BCal brand to serve business routes and the Air Europe brand to serve leisure markets as well as an engineering and a ground handling unit.

BCal's senior management rejected ILG's renewed bid on the grounds that it still did not adequately reflect the value of the group's assets, in particular those of BCal. In addition, BCal's senior management felt that both airlines' nature of operations and their business strategies were incompatible and that therefore there were no synergies to be gained from combining BCal with what they regarded as "essentially a charter company".

=== Air Europe's unsuccessful attempt to see off ailing Dan-Air ===
The presence of Dan-Air, a major scheduled and charter operator at Gatwick and Manchester, Air Europe's two largest bases, meant that Air Europe was facing a potential competitor for every additional scheduled service and charter contract that became available. Dan-Air's large-scale presence at Gatwick, the airport's increasing scarcity of early morning peak time slots, and the fact that Dan-Air had already been licensed to operate scheduled services to some of the destinations Air Europe wanted to serve as well while only a quarter of London's and a third of the entire Southeast's population lived in Gatwick's catchment area also meant that attaining the "critical mass" to make its scheduled operation viable became an uphill struggle for Air Europe. This situation was made worse by the state of the British economy in the late 1980s, which was overheating and going to give way to a major recession during the early years of the following decade.

In addition, the CAA's decision to re-allocate the licences for several of British Caledonian's short-haul Gatwick feeder routes, which British Airways had agreed to return to the licensing process as a concession to have its takeover of that airline approved, to Air Europe, Air UK and Dan-Air weakened the overall performance of the airport's scheduled services. As a result of this decision, Air Europe was excluded from the two main London—Scotland trunk routes and it was forced to compete head-on with Dan-Air to Paris Charles de Gaulle and Jersey.

Dan-Air's growing financial problems at the time provided the impetus for ILG's high-profile publicity campaign not to miss an opportunity to run down its ailing competitor in the press, accusing it of operating old, "gas-guzzling" aircraft. As part of this 'anti-Dan-Air' campaign, ILG had already announced that Intasun was going to reduce the number of aircraft it chartered from Dan-Air from six to three for the 1989/90 winter season. ILG made a further announcement in this regard, stating that Intasun was no longer going to charter any Dan-Air aircraft for the 1990 summer season and that Air Europe was going to cancel its maintenance contract with Dan-Air Engineering.

However, ILG's campaign to deal a fatal blow to Air Europe's main rival suffered a major setback in October 1990 when Dan-Air's beleaguered management appointed "company doctor" David James, who immediately set about refinancing Dan-Air's parent organisation Davies and Newman Holdings in order to save the airline.

ILG's commercial attack on Dan-Air ultimately failed when David James's attempt to refinance Davies and Newman succeeded, with sufficient funds to allow Dan-Air to carry on its business for another two years.

=== End ===
At the end of the first week of March 1991 ILG and all of its UK-based subsidiaries entered administration resulting in 4,000 job losses. Many of the aircraft operated by Air Europe and Air Europe Express were impounded, leaving a large number of passengers stranded at airports. The Airlines of Europe conglomerate quickly unravelled, with Norway Airlines following its former UK-based parent into liquidation.

Hans Rudolf Wöhrl, NFD's founder and original majority shareholder, bought back the stake he had sold to ILG from the administrators, thereby saving NFD. Air Europa survived the collapse and successfully established itself as one of the leading charter and scheduled operators in Spain. Air Europe Italy became one of the leading independent Italian airlines following ILG's failure. Most of the Spanish and Italian sister airlines' aircraft retained the UK carrier's livery for a few years.

=== Causes of collapse ===
The main causes leading to the collapse of ILG and its UK-based subsidiaries, including Air Europe and Air Europe Express, were:

- A major, unforeseen downturn in traffic as a result of the recessionary economic conditions in the UK.
- The looming Gulf War
- Undercapitalisation
- An unsound financial structure
- Being financially overextended
- Lack of ownership of any significant assets
- A high-risk strategy.

Against the background of the looming war during the summer of 1990 and an abrupt recession in the UK, ILG began suffering heavy losses and mounting debts.

ILG/Air Europe's senior management was aware that ILG had been facing a cash crunch from as early as 1989. This had made it more and more difficult for the group to finance the aircraft it already had on order, notably the F100s and the MD-11s. It was also clear to them that ILG did not have sufficient funds to run a fully fledged, rapidly growing scheduled operation in addition to a major charter operation.

ILG's opaque financial structure and the fact that as a privately held company its ultimate owners, some of whom were residing abroad, were not subject to the same kind of strict financial disclosure requirements as the owners of publicly listed firms further exacerbated the group's financial instability, thereby contributing to its collapse as well.

In addition to the group's undercapitalisation and its overstretched finances, ILG generally and Air Europe in particular were not backed up by any significant assets.

For instance, Air Europe did not own any of the shiny, new aircraft in its fleet. (These were usually procured on highly favourable terms from the manufacturers and then sold upon delivery to ILG's in-house leasing subsidiaries, such as AE Finance or AE Norsk, or to third party lessors, such as Guinness Peat Aviation (GPA), from whom the airline subsequently leased them back. This enabled it to keep them off its balance sheet, thereby being relieved of the financial burden resulting from the aircraft's depreciation, while keeping a substantial interest in the aircraft's residual values, which were booked as profits. This sale-and-lease-back activity was a central plank of ILG's corporate strategy. It also constituted a major part of ILG's business and accounted for a large slice of its profits.)

Neither did the group hold the titles to the freehold of any of the properties that housed its offices and other facilities that formed an integral part of the business.

Air Europe's massive expansion into high-profile scheduled services plying trunk routes between major European cities towards the end of the 1980s, the airline's huge aircraft commitments lasting well into the 1990s, and ILG's increasing reliance on profits arising from its interest in the US dollar-denominated residual values of the aircraft operated by its airline subsidiaries for the group's overall profitability from 1989 represented a high-risk strategy for an undercapitalised company. This marked a major shift from the original focus on establishing Air Europe and Intasun as a major force in the UK charter airline/package tour market as well as Air Europe's excursion into operating scheduled services on selected leisure routes only.

Although ILG had justified this strategic shift by the new strategy's far greater rewards compared with the old one, some members among its senior management suspected that there was an ulterior motive to all this. It was well known among senior company insiders that several sets of exploratory talks had taken place at various times, involving ILG and British Airways, as well as ILG and American Airlines. ILG had also held similar talks with a number of other interested parties. These talks had centred on how to intensify those parties' co-operation with ILG/Air Europe, including proposals for a full-scale merger/takeover.

This lack of being an asset-backed organisation with a high-risk strategy made lending money to ILG and its subsidiaries a far riskier proposition than lending to Davies and Newman Holdings, the parent company of Air Europe's ailing rival Dan-Air. Not only did Davies and Newman/Dan-Air actually own many of the aircraft in the ailing airline's fleet, which were mainly older, less efficient planes with a generally low re-sale value, but it also held the title to the freehold of a number of commercial properties, including prime real estate in the City of London. Moreover, Davies and Newman was the owner of Dan-Air Engineering, a sister company of the airline as well as the UK's second-biggest and one of the world's best-equipped aircraft engineering organisations at the time.

These were the main reasons ILG's lenders, notably Lloyds Bank, which also had a substantial financial exposure to Davies and Newman, ultimately decided to pull the plug on the former rather than the latter, despite Air Europe being perceived as operationally far superior and financially stronger than Dan-Air by many of those who had no intimate knowledge of the true state of ILG's finances. This included many well-reputed industry analysts as well as seasoned observers.

=== Legacy ===
Air Europe was typical of the trend which dominated the British holiday market in the 1980s, with tour companies operating their own in-house airlines, which, although accruing considerable capital expense in the first instance, enabled these companies to offer lower prices by effectively cutting out the "middle man".

Intasun and its associated ILG-owned tour companies, Global and Lancaster, became what many consumers saw as the cheaper alternative to the other main British tour operator of the time, Thomson Holidays.

The existence of these two major brands helped open up the foreign holiday market. The fierce competition between them provided families with affordable and competitive packages.

Air Europe and Intasun were used as a template for many aspiring British tour operators, such as Cardiff-based Aspro Holidays, which launched its own in-house airline, Inter European Airways, in 1987, as well as Airtours (later rebranded as MyTravel), which merged with Aspro in 1993, to create the second largest tour operator in the UK and which was widely recognised as the direct successor to Intasun and Air Europe.

== Facts ==
=== Facts and statistics ===
- The airline clocked up its first one million miles on 26 July 1979, its load factor averaged 94% during the peak month of August and the 100,000th passenger boarded in September.
- It made an operating profit after only nine weeks of trading.
- It was allocated the two-letter AE airline identification designator in October 1980, allowing it to replace the initial KS designator.
- The airline's application to the CAA requesting permission to carry mail and newspapers on its regular charter services from London Gatwick to Gibraltar on days when there were no scheduled flights was approved on 7 November 1980.
- It introduced a separate premium class cabin branded Premier Class on its charter flights between London Gatwick and Funchal in November 1983.
- Air Europe became the first customer in a new American Airlines flight training centre near Gatwick Airport in 1983.
- The airline won the prestigious Travel Trade Gazette Top Charter Airline of the Year award twice in two consecutive years, 1983 as well as 1984.
- It achieved full Category III compliance in 1985.
- Air Europe operated its own airside executive lounge at Gatwick's South Terminal.
- ILG was estimated to have gross liabilities of £460 million at the end of October 1990 and it lost £56 million in its last three months of trading.

== Accidents and incidents ==
Air Europe had no fatal accidents involving its own aircraft.

A widely reported flight deck fire involved an Air Europe aircraft in its penultimate season. On 17 December 1989, a F100 PH-ZCL en route from Copenhagen to Gatwick suffered a flight deck fire, necessitating a return to Kastrup Airport. None of the 88 occupants (seven crew and 81 passengers) were harmed by the fire that had started behind the co-pilot's seat. The aircraft needed to be taken out of service and was sent for repairs in the Netherlands. It re-entered service on 22 June 1990.

== See also ==
- List of defunct airlines of the United Kingdom
