= Reasons for the failure of British Caledonian =

Private British independent airline

British Caledonian (BCal) was a private independent airline in the United Kingdom that operated primarily from London Gatwick Airport from 1970 until 1988, when a number of factors forced it to merge with British Airways (BA). BCal was originally formed by the merger of Caledonian Airways (CA) and British United Airways (BUA) as an alternative to the British state-owned and controlled airlines British European Airways (BEA) and British Overseas Airways Corporation (BOAC). The Conservative Thatcher government of the time wanted a private-sector carrier to take on BEA and BOAC by providing competing domestic and international services on trunk routes, and BCal thus came to fill the role of the "Second Force" in British commercial aviation proposed by a 1969 Government white paper.

Although BCal eventually became the UK's foremost independent, internationally-scheduled airline, a series of major financial setbacks during the mid-1980s, combined with the airline's inability to reach a viable size, put it at serious risk of collapse. In December 1987, following substantial losses, BCal was taken over by the newly privatised British Airways (BA). The prime causes of BCal's demise can be put down to four broad factors: being based at Gatwick Airport; its compromised route structure; a number of licensing hurdles; and the British Government's conflicts of interest in aviation policy.

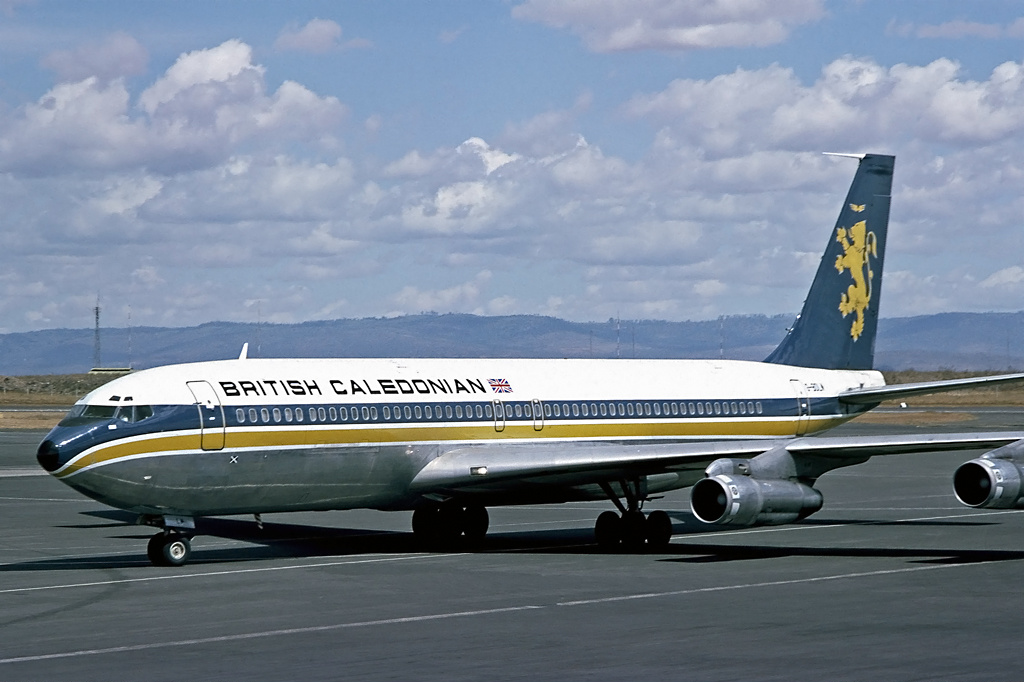
A British Caledonian Boeing 707-320C

== Gatwick base ==
BCal operated primarily out of London Gatwick Airport in south-east England, a minimum of 52 miles by road from central London, as compared to Heathrow Airport's 17 miles. This location disadvantaged BCal in a number of ways when compared with other airlines based at Heathrow.

=== Catchment area ===
Heathrow Airport has a bigger catchment area than Gatwick Airport because more people live north of the Thames than south of it. Heathrow's catchment area includes about three-quarters of London's population and roughly two-thirds of the population of Southeast England, and London is where most of the demand for air travel in the South East originates. In addition, for most Londoners Gatwick was a far less accessible airport than Heathrow in the days prior to the M25, as a result of the airport's greater distance from most parts of London. In those days it took almost two hours to drive there from central London despite the low level of vehicular traffic. The only advantage Gatwick enjoyed over Heathrow in terms of ease and speed of access was its direct rail link to London Victoria station.

The size of an airport's catchment area and its accessibility are of particular significance for the premium travel market. Heathrow's larger catchment area meant that it was able to offer more frequent flights to a greater number of destinations with more conveniently timed connections. This in turn helped attract a greater number of business travellers who were the airlines' most profitable customers, with there being at least four to five business travellers in Heathrow's catchment area for every business traveller in Gatwick's catchment area. This difference in Heathrow's and Gatwick's respective geographic locations, as well as the number of people living within each airport's catchment area, accounted for differences in load factors, revenues, and yields between the two airports.

As a general rule, a full-service scheduled operation at Gatwick with a fare structure that was identical to a similar operation at Heathrow produced a 10% lower passenger load factor. For example, BCal's scheduled passenger load factors at Gatwick rarely exceeded 60% of their aircraft's capacities, whereas comparable BA load factors at Heathrow were usually above 70%. Consequently, a scheduled service at Gatwick generated a 20% lower revenue and resulted in a 15% lower yield than a comparable service at Heathrow. BCal tried to compensate for the difference in passenger load factors between Gatwick and Heathrow by being a more cargo-oriented carrier than BA, and as a result cargo accounted for a greater share of BCal's total revenues and profits than for BA.

=== Lack of a "hub" ===
The disadvantage of BCal's location at Gatwick was further compounded by the fact that Gatwick had few connecting flights during the 1970s and early 1980s, as a result of firstly, the overall regulatory regime, and secondly, the specific bilateral air services agreements the UK Government had negotiated with its overseas counterparts. At the same time, Heathrow was the most important point in the world for interline traffic with more passengers changing flights there than at any other airport. Whatever connections there were at Gatwick were mostly provided by BCal itself, at great cost to the airline.

Although the network of scheduled services passed on to BCal after its creation represented the best that BUA's then-managing director Sir Freddie Laker had been able to put in place under the prevailing regulatory regime, BCal's resulting network of domestic, European, and intercontinental long-haul scheduled services from Gatwick was a motley collection of routes, making it difficult to offer sensible connections that could be marketed to the travelling public. This made it difficult to develop profitable streams of transfer traffic using Gatwick as a hub, for it was a challenge to persuade people to fly to Gatwick from relatively minor places like Genoa or Jersey in order to make an onward connection at the airport to secondary places in Africa or South America, and an even greater challenge to do this profitably.

At the height of its commercial success in the late 1970s and early 1980s, BCal focused on those routes that carried a very high proportion of profitable, oil-related, premium business traffic. It even managed to become the preferred airline for high-ranking oil industry executives based in Texas by providing convenient, hassle-free connections between Houston/Dallas, Lagos and Tripoli via the airline's Gatwick base. However, this initially successful "oil hub" strategy for Gatwick made the company dependent for most of its profits on a small number of markets whose fortunes were tied to the commodity price cycle in unstable parts of the world. Although this worked in BCal's favour when the price of a barrel of crude oil was high during the late 1970s and early 1980s, it worked against it when the oil price collapsed in the mid-1980s, further compounding the firm's growing financial problems at the time and culminating in the financial crisis that led to its takeover by BA.

== Route structure ==
The route structure BCal inherited from BUA at the time of its inception was the result of unplanned and unsystematic growth since the early 1960s. The British Government had conducted an aviation policy review in the mid-1970s against a backdrop of huge losses faced by the airline industry in the aftermath of the early-1970s oil crisis, which had effectively eliminated long-haul competition. The resultant 1976 "spheres of influence" policy imposed on both major British scheduled airlines at that time – BA and BCal – left them with fragmented networks, thereby putting them at a competitive disadvantage in comparison with their main overseas rivals. This weakening of BA's and BCal's international competitive strength was of far greater concern to the latter as it was much smaller than either BA or most of its foreign-based competitors, and had a less comprehensive network offering fewer connections than most rival airlines.So in the early years after BCal's formation only very limited opportunities existed for wholly-privately-owned independent airlines to provide fully-fledged scheduled air services on major domestic and international trunk routes.

=== Restrictive bilateral air-services agreements ===
Restrictions in bilateral air-services agreements between the UK and foreign countries seriously impeded BCal's efforts to successfully build the network of short-haul European feeder services that was essential to providing sufficient transfer traffic for its long-haul routes from Gatwick. These restrictions made it difficult for the airline to offer its passengers a more frequent service on certain long-haul routes that could have attracted more high-yield business traffic. It also left BCal with an incomplete network, which resulted in a weak route structure, a major competitive disadvantage.

Restrictive bilateral air services agreements that had little or no scope for dual designation meant that BCal was effectively kept out of many markets for which it had already obtained licences from the UK's Civil Aviation Authority (CAA). Even where the bilateral air services agreement between the UK and a foreign country enabled BCal to be designated as the second UK flag carrier, the airline still faced numerous restrictions in terms of the number of flights it could operate, the number of seats it could sell, or the lowest fares it could offer.

For example, the Anglo-French air treaty did not limit the number of airlines the UK Government could designate on the London–Paris route. However, it stipulated that all British airlines' combined share of the total capacity on that route could not exceed the combined capacity share of all French airlines, and that all capacity increases needed to be mutually agreed by both sides. As Air France was the only airline the French government had designated to serve this route, this effectively meant that BA and BCal were compelled to share the 50% of the total capacity between London and Paris that had been allocated to the UK between themselves.

The treaty also gave Air France an effective veto over any capacity increase, thereby allowing that airline to dictate the pace at which additional capacity could be added. It took BCal 15 years to attain a 20% share of the London–Paris market's total capacity from when it commenced scheduled operations on that route. BCal tried to work around these restrictions by using larger BAC One-Eleven 500 aircraft in a low-density configuration featuring a first class section on weekdays and smaller, single-class BAC One-Eleven 200 aircraft on weekends. This enabled it to offer a higher frequency on weekdays, resulting in a more competitive schedule for business travellers while keeping within its allocated capacity share. BCal faced similar capacity restrictions on the London–Amsterdam and London–Brussels routes.

Other European governments refused requests from their UK counterpart to have BCal designated as a second UK flag carrier, employing a variety of arguments: that there was no equivalent of a "Second Force" in their countries that could have matched the additional capacity BCal would have offered; that there simply was no spare capacity to do so; that doing so would violate the letter and spirit of the relevant bilateral air treaties/pool agreements; or that total British market share already exceeded that of the relevant overseas flag carriers when charter traffic was included as well.

Some countries even imposed capacity restrictions on BCal's operations on regional routes that did not compete with any trunk routes and therefore could not have caused a diversion of traffic from these routes. BCal's London–Genoa route was a case in point. The only way the Italian authorities agreed to BCal's request to add an additional Saturday frequency on that route was to compel the airline to enter into a pool agreement with Alitalia. Under the pool agreement, BCal was forced to share its revenues on that route with Italy's flag carrier, even after that airline had withdrawn its own Heathrow–Genoa service that it had originally operated in competition with the Gatwick–Genoa service provided by BUA/BCal.

Such anti-competitive practices afflicting BCal were not confined to its European operations. The bilateral agreements governing most of BCal's long-haul routes obliged the airline to enter into a pool agreement with the designated foreign flag carrier[s]. These agreements stipulated that all revenues were to be equally shared by all carriers serving the same route. This usually meant that revenues were shared on a 50:50 basis, regardless of each carrier's actual market share. The only exceptions to this rule were the US and Asian countries to which BCal flew. As far as the US was concerned, no US airline was allowed to enter into a pool agreement with any other airline – especially, a wholly/majority government-owned, foreign carrier – as this constituted a violation of that country's antitrust laws. With regard to the Asian countries that received scheduled services from BCal, the UK already had fully liberalised or fairly liberal bilateral air services agreements with these countries.

=== Revenue implications ===
Since the early-1970s oil crisis, only the four short-haul BCal routes from Gatwick to Paris, Brussels, Jersey and Genoa had made a positive financial contribution to the company, with Paris, Jersey and Genoa being the only routes that were genuinely profitable in their own right. However, given the fact that 40% of the airline's scheduled passengers were changing from one of its flights to another at Gatwick, BCal's dependency on providing this limited number of feeder services was such that withdrawing any of these services or significantly reducing frequencies – even those of loss-making services – would have an immediate and negative impact on the loads of the profitable long-haul services and, therefore, on the company's overall profitability. For example, BCal continued operating BUA's former regional routes from Gatwick to Le Touquet and Rotterdam for several years to provide additional capacity to/from alternative airports that were relatively close to the main airports where its operations were subject to capacity restrictions.

It was with this in mind that BCal's senior management had always justified keeping its UK mainland domestic trunk routes despite them losing £2 million each year ever since BA had introduced its high-frequency Shuttle service on these routes from Heathrow. On the face of it, Gatwick's smaller catchment area did not allow BCal to generate the minimum traffic flows that would have made a high-frequency domestic service from Gatwick a viable competitor for BA's Shuttle service. Even so, BCal's senior management had estimated that its short-haul domestic feeder flights generated additional yearly long-haul revenues of £5 million and that the European feeder services added £20 million to the company's long-haul revenues. Hence their importance to the company.

== Licensing hurdles ==
The overall regulatory regime during the 1970s and early 1980s necessitated going through a costly and time-consuming process to gain a licence to operate a scheduled service, further complicating BCal's attempts to rationalise and build its route system. This cumbersome process involved lengthy hearings that the CAA conducted for each route application where BA and other independent airlines – which felt the Government's policy of making BCal its "chosen instrument" of the private sector discriminated against them – objected to BCal's application and – in cases where there were several rival applications – against each other as well. There was often no scope for designating a second British scheduled airline in addition to the incumbent carrier. This meant that even in those cases where BCal had succeeded in securing licences to operate scheduled services on routes of its choice, it was prevented from using these licences if it involved an international service where there was no scope in the relevant bilateral agreement for the UK Government to designate BCal as the second UK flag carrier.

Despite BCal being awarded several licenses to commence scheduled services on a number of high-profile long-haul routes with a good mix of business and leisure traffic, the Government made little or no attempt to assist the airline in obtaining reciprocal traffic rights from overseas governments that would have enabled it to use all of these licences. For instance, the CAA had awarded BCal licences to launch fully fledged scheduled services from London Gatwick to New York's John F. Kennedy Airport (JFK), Los Angeles, Boston, Houston, Atlanta, Toronto and Singapore during the 1972 "Cannonball" hearings. However, it took the UK Government four years to negotiate a new air services agreement with the US government that actually enabled BCal to make use of its Houston and Atlanta licences. Renegotiation of the then very restrictive UK–Canadian air treaty that could have permitted BCal to operate a scheduled service to Toronto took even longer. British Overseas Airways Corporation's resistance to opening the lucrative Far Eastern route to Singapore to home-grown competition by another British scheduled airline was so strong that BCal eventually only managed to obtain a renewable, three-months exempt charter permit, which entitled it to operate a small number of seat-only charter flights between Gatwick, Bahrain and Singapore.

== UK government's conflicts of interest ==
The conflicts of interest that arose out of the UK Government's dual role as the sole owner of BA as well as the regulator for all UK airlines meant that the interests of the "Second Force" airline were not always at the top of the Government's list of priorities, particularly as BA accounted for between three-quarters and four-fifths of the total output of Britain's air transport industry.

=== Undermining the "Second Force" concept ===
At the time of BCal's inception, politicians on the left of the UK's political spectrum – in particular, Labour left wingers and most of the unions – opposed wholly private, independent airlines providing scheduled services in competition with the state-owned corporations. These critics' worldview had been shaped by their World War II and early post-War experiences, leading them to regard any form of competition as a waste of scarce resources. Some of them were also ideologically driven in their opposition to "Second Force" private enterprise playing a prominent role in the UK's air transport industry. In addition, the UK Government itself began to undermine the "Second Force" concept when it decided to re-allocate BCal's unused Gatwick–JFK and Gatwick–Los Angeles International licenses to rival independent airline Laker Airways, following Sir Freddie Laker's high-profile, public campaign to get his proposed Skytrain off the ground.

The "Second Force" concept was further undermined when the Government overturned the CAA's refusal to grant British Midland a license to begin domestic scheduled services on the two main trunk routes between London and Scotland from Heathrow, but without giving BCal reciprocal access to that airport. Moreover, the CAA itself undermined the "Second Force" policy by awarding Air Europe licences to launch scheduled services on several routes from Gatwick to Continental Europe in direct competition with existing BCal services. These measures significantly weakened BCal, as they had a detrimental effect on the airline's ability to establish itself as an effective competitor to the major scheduled airlines that were operating from Heathrow. The "Second Force" policy was finally killed off when the Government decided to go ahead with BA's privatisation.

=== BA's privatisation ===
The British Government's conflict of interest in aviation matters presented it with a dilemma when it was preparing BA for privatisation during the mid-1980s. It knew that the privatised former national carrier was likely to pose a major threat to BCal without substantial route transfers from BA to BCal. These might enable BCal to become big enough to compete on a level playing field with BA and other large scheduled airlines, and hence have a chance of surviving. At the same time, the Government was well aware that it risked undermining BA's successful flotation on the London Stock Exchange if it agreed to the transfer of several of BA's most lucrative long-haul routes to BCal, together with the removal of all capacity restrictions on short-haul routes where both airlines were already competing with each other, as recommended by the CAA in its 1984 airline competition White Paper and requested by BCal itself.

The Government's failure to fully accept the CAA's recommendations and to permit only a limited transfer of routes from BA to BCal, as well as the maintenance of capacity restrictions on all short-haul feeder routes proposed by BCal itself and advocated by the CAA's review of airline competition policy ahead of BA's privatisation, resulted in BCal not becoming big enough in terms of economies of scale and scope to develop an efficient hub-and-spoke operation at Gatwick that would have enabled BCal to compete with a much bigger, privatised BA, as well as the giant US carriers on a level playing field. Instead, the limited route transfer still left BCal in an operationally and financially much weaker position than its far bigger and stronger rivals. This increased the airline's vulnerability to external shocks, thereby seriously undermining its financial strength to withstand crises and eventually resulted in its being taken over by BA.
