= British Caledonian in the 1980s =

Unfortunate events of British Airline British Caledonian (BCal)

British Caledonian in the 1970s
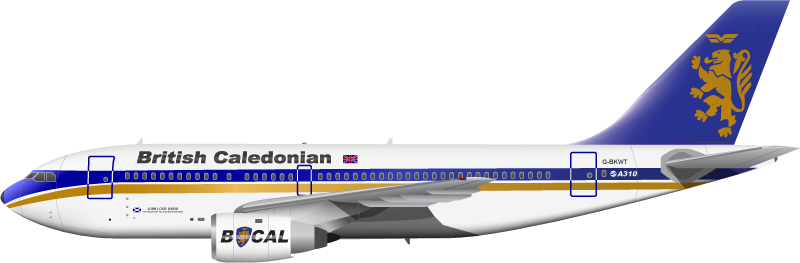
- Livery of British Caledonian on an Airbus A310-200
- Founded: November 1970
- Ceased operations: 14 April 1988

British airline British Caledonian (BCal) suffered a series of major setbacks in the 1980s as a result of several geopolitical events that occurred during that decade. These events significantly weakened BCal operationally and financially. They were the main factors that contributed to the airline's demise in 1988.

== Network expansion ==
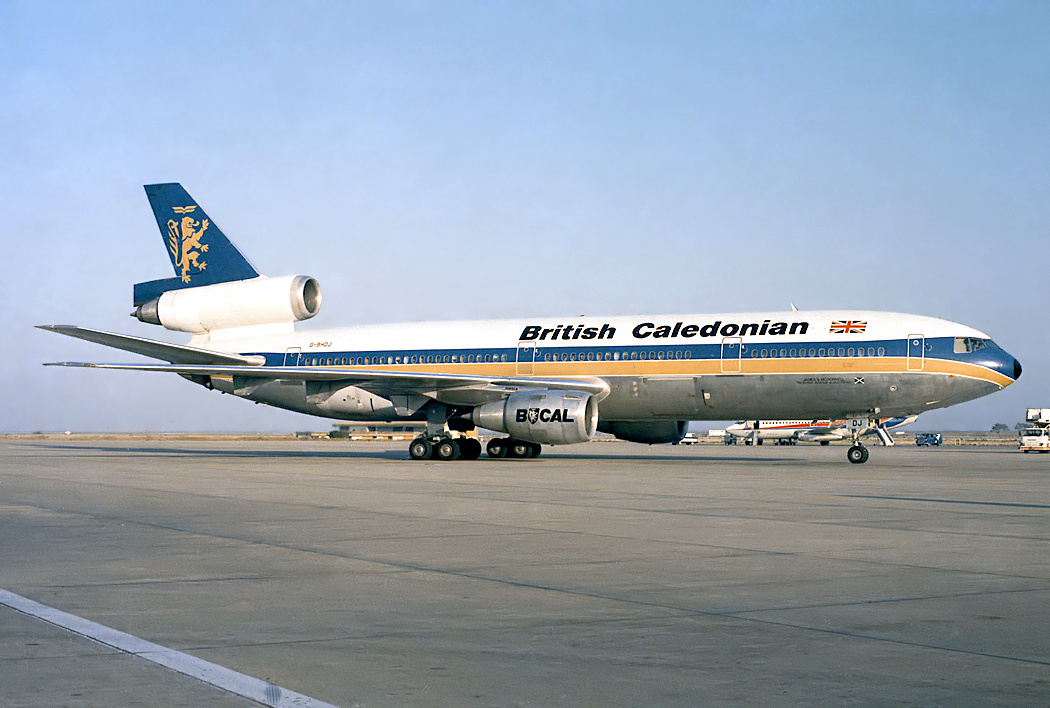
McDonnell Douglas DC-10-30, one of BCals's new aircraft in 1980, at Faro Airport in 1986.

BCal took delivery of three more McDonnell Douglas DC-10-30 widebodied aircraft in 1980.

These planes enabled the launch of new routes – to Atlanta on 1 June, and to Hong Kong on 1 August, though in the latter Cathay Pacific and Laker Airways were also permitted without restriction on frequency or fares. Routes to San Juan, Puerto Rico's Isla Verde International Airport, and Dallas/Fort Worth followed on 26 October. It also enabled the airline to replace the Boeing 707s, with which it had inaugurated another new route to St. Louis in April of that year, with its newly delivered DC-10 widebodies at the end of October when St. Louis became a stop on the new Dallas/Fort Worth route. During that year, the company also added Tangier to its North African network.

This accelerated pace of growth made BCal the fastest growing member airline of the Association of European Airlines (AEA) in both 1980 and 1981.

BCal received a boost during 1980, when the Civil Aviation Authority (CAA) approved carriers (BCal, Cathay Pacific and Laker – subject to ratification) on the London – Hong Kong route to be able to pick up and put down passengers at intermediate stops in the Gulf states as the Hong Kong route was not otherwise expected to generate enough revenue for four carriers. For BCal this meant using their Dubai refuelling stop to carry passengers, cargo and mail between London and Dubai and Dubai and Hong Kong, despite objections from British Airways (BA) which already had such rights for Dubai and Bahrain.

BCal's 10th anniversary on 30 November 1980 coincided with the completion of its new corporate headquarters — aptly named Caledonian House — in Crawley's Lowfield Heath area close to the airline's Gatwick base. It was the first purpose-built headquarters in the company's history, which was designed to accommodate all 1,100 office-based staff at the airline's Gatwick base under one roof.

The high oil price during that period was a mixed blessing for BCal. It helped the airline fill its premium cabins on its oil-related business routes to Nigeria, Libya and Texas. On the other hand, the escalation of the jet fuel price and the fact that the high price of oil had considerably worsened the severe recession in Britain at that time significantly increased the company's operating costs, while at the same time reducing overall demand for its flights. BCal therefore decided to reduce off-peak frequencies on most of its short-haul routes from the start of the 1980/81 winter timetable period. This also included combining week-end, off-peak flights from Gatwick to Glasgow, Edinburgh and Manchester by converting non-stop flights into one-stop operations.

Among the set-backs BCal suffered at that time were the CAA's rejection of its application to serve Manila (Philippines) from Hong Kong or Singapore and BA's successful lobbying of the Government to revoke BCal's long-standing Gatwick—Bahrain—Singapore exempt charter licence in return for having granted it permission to launch a fully fledged scheduled service to Hong Kong.

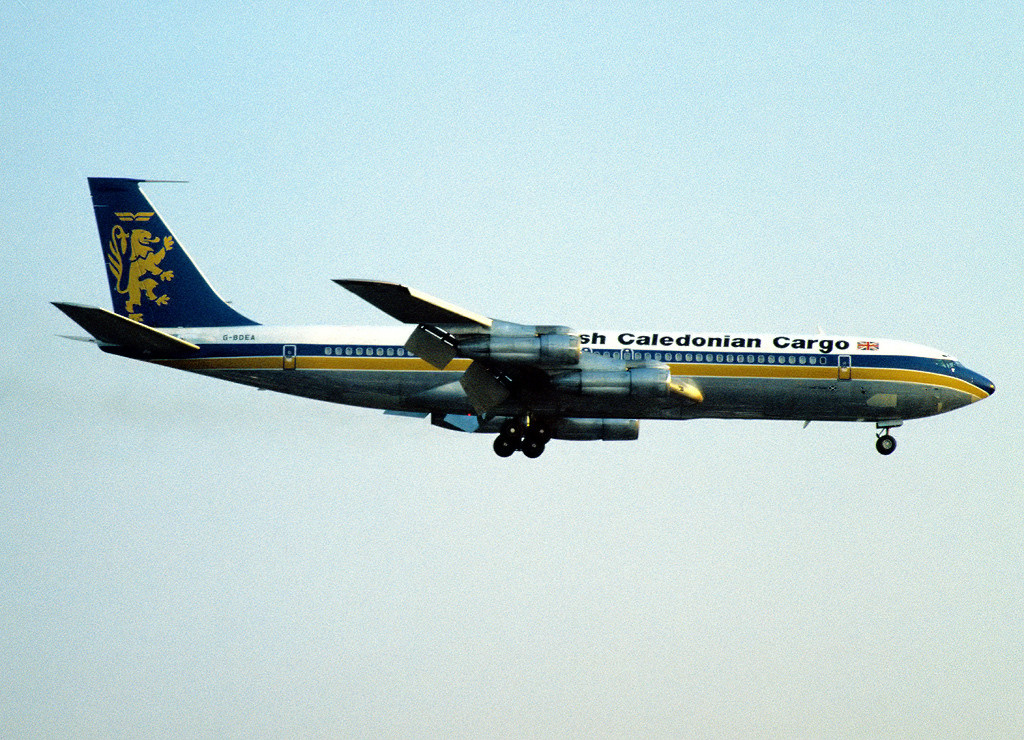
A BCal Boeing 707-320C freighter seen landing at Gatwick in September 1981.

BCal ended the 1979/80 financial year with a healthy profit of £9.7 million.

BCal received another new DC-10-30 widebody in 1981. The delivery of this aircraft enabled the airline to increase frequencies on the prime long-haul routes to West Africa from seven to 10 weekly round-trips. It also permitted a frequency increase on the Gatwick—Dubai—Hong Kong route from four to five weekly round-trips.

At the start of the 1981/82 winter timetable period, BCal added Douala (Cameroon) to its network.

Also in 1981, BCal opened a new engine overhaul plant at Prestwick Airport near Glasgow in Scotland. The new engine overhaul plant was owned and run by Caledonian Airmotive, a dedicated, wholly owned subsidiary of the airline, which had been set up with technical support from GE.

BCal's search for a more fuel-efficient replacement for its ageing BAC One-Eleven fleet — especially, the range-limited One-Eleven 200s — acquired a new sense of urgency during 1981 against a backdrop of further escalating fuel prices. The airline was evaluating both the new BAe ATP turboprop for entry into service during 1986 and the BAe 146, the UK aircraft manufacturer's new, four-engined regional jet that was due to enter service in 1983, in addition to the McDonnell Douglas MD-80 and the new Boeing 737-300. Both British Aerospace types were rejected because it was felt that they had insufficient range to permit non-stop flights from BCal's Gatwick base to some of the more distant points BCal already served or planned to serve in Europe and North Africa. Moreover, BCal felt that operating a turboprop on trunk routes would meet with passenger resistance as by that time most people had become accustomed to travelling on jets on these routes.

In 1981, BCal applied to the UK and Australian authorities for permission to launch a fully fledged, three-class scheduled service between Gatwick and Brisbane (via Colombo and Melbourne), and between Gatwick and Adelaide (via Perth), at a frequency of two flights a week each, in both directions. BCal proposed to inaugurate what would have been the first ever scheduled operation "Down Under" by a wholly private, British independent airline with McDonnell Douglas DC-10-30s. BCal wanted this to be a joint operation with Ansett Airlines, one of Australia's two leading contemporary domestic airlines, and held out the prospect of placing an order for brand-new, higher capacity Boeing 747-200SUDs (Note: Stretched Upper Deck) to replace the DC-10s on that route as soon as this was justified by increased demand. It also promised to give a major boost to Australia's inbound tourism from the UK and to deliver a steady stream of international transfer passengers to Ansett. BCal's application did not succeed, mainly because of British Airways's and Qantas's determined opposition to any move by the authorities in the UK and Australia to dilute the lucrative BA-Qantas duopoly on the "kangaroo route". The CAA turned down BCal's application although it considered it superior to a rival application by Laker Airways as it felt that there was no realistic chance of obtaining reciprocal approval for the proposed service from the relevant Australian authorities, as long as there was no desire on their part to license a second Australian carrier as well. It did promise to look favourably on the application if BCal re-submitted it with specific proposals for a joint Anglo-Australian operation, once Australia no longer opposed licensing additional carriers on that route.

BCal ended its 1980/81 financial year with a £6.2 million loss as a result of high fuel prices, a major recession on both sides of the Atlantic and heavy route development costs.

=== Expanding eastwards ===
As a result of the network structure BCal had inherited from British United Airways (BUA), an exclusive North-South airline, it became a predominantly North-South orientated carrier as well. The predominant North-South route structure had been further reinforced by the 1976 "spheres of influence" policy, which had locked the airline's long-haul operation into two continents — Africa and South America.

BCal's senior management realised that it needed to develop the traffic flows across its network in an East-West direction to increase the network's reach and to enable its passengers to make omnidirectional flight connections. This was also essential to enable the airline to increase its economies of scale and to reach the minimum size envisaged in the Edwards report.

BCal's new Gatwick—Dubai—Hong Kong route was intended to be just the first step in this expansion to the East. The Hong Kong route had come about as a result of the UK government decision in 1979 to open up the lucrative route between London and the Crown Colony of Hong Kong to additional competition. This was to be provided by a second British scheduled carrier to ease the shortage of capacity passengers were experiencing at peak times on the monopoly service operated by BA from Heathrow to Hong Kong. BCal, Laker and Cathay Pacific, Hong Kong's airline and its de facto "flag carrier", all applied to the CAA.

BCal had proposed running a conventional scheduled service from Gatwick to Hong Kong via Dubai utilising its rapidly growing fleet of McDonnell Douglas DC-10-30 widebodies in a three-class configuration featuring a first and an executive class in addition to an economy cabin. BCal had also agreed to offer a limited number of low fares that would match the lowest fares Laker had proposed. The CAA decided to license BCal to operate unlimited scheduled services between London and Hong Kong., rejecting both Cathay Pacific's and Laker's applications, clearing the way for BCal to become the second British scheduled carrier on that route.

However, Hong Kong's Air Transport Licensing Authority (ATLA) unexpectedly refused to endorse BCal because many influential people in the Crown Colony felt very upset that Cathay Pacific was going to be excluded from one of the world's most lucrative air routes. This caused a minor diplomatic row between the UK government and the colonial administration in Hong Kong. Cathay Pacific immediately began a back-door lobbying campaign in the Crown Colony as well as in London, stressing that it had invested millions of pounds in the British economy at a time of high unemployment in the UK by placing large orders for Rolls-Royce RB211-powered Boeing 747s. The UK government allowed Cathay Pacific and Laker to appeal to John Nott, the British Secretary of State for Trade and Industry, against the CAA's decision. Nott overturned the CAA's decision opening the route to all three without imposing any restrictions on service frequencies.

With the competition from Cathay Pacific, BCal decided to operate only four weekly round-trips instead of a daily service they had originally planned. Cathay Pacific commenced a thrice-weekly service between Hong Kong and Gatwick via Bahrain on 17 July 1980 ahead of BCal, which began its four-times-a-week Gatwick—Hong Kong service via Dubai on 1 August 1980.

=== A commuter division ===
To further improve its network connectivity and to transform Gatwick into a US style airline hub, BCal established a dedicated commuter services network under the British Caledonian Commuter Services brand at the start of the 1982/83 winter timetable period. BCal's commuter network was modelled on the Allegheny Airlines commuter system, the first dedicated commuter operation in the world launched in 1967.

The first airline to join the British Caledonian Commuter scheme in 1982 was Humberside Airport-based Genair.

Genair, which had been formed as a Manchester-based executive charter airline in November 1980, commenced operations with a single Beech King Air E90. Following its move to Liverpool in February 1981, in June of that year, it acquired an 18-seater Embraer Bandeirante and began regional scheduled services to Amsterdam and London Gatwick. Closer links with BCal, followed by Genair's participation in the British Caledonian Commuter scheme and its subsequent relocation to Humberside in late 1982, resulted in acquisition of a small fleet of Short SD3-30 and Short SD3-60 commuter turboprop planes, which were [re-]painted in British Caledonian Commuter colours. Genair used these aircraft to replace Bandeirantes on Gatwick—Liverpool and launch new feeder routes linking BCal's Gatwick base with Humberside, Norwich, Teesside, Leeds/Bradford, Bristol and Cardiff. All flights on these routes were operated under BCal flight numbers using the BR designator. Barbara Harmer, one of Genair's SD3-30 pilots at the time, joined BCal in March 1984, where she first flew One-Elevens before transitioning to DC-10s. Harmer subsequently became the UK's first and only female Concorde pilot following BCal's takeover by BA.

Other airlines that joined the British Caledonian Commuter scheme at its inception included Brymon Airways and Guernsey Airlines. The former operated the feeder routes from Gatwick to Birmingham, East Midlands and Plymouth, while the CAA had transferred Air UK's Gatwick—Guernsey licence to the latter following numerous passenger complaints about the service Air UK had previously provided since it had assumed the former BIA operation on that route.

=== More routes to Europe ===
Following BA's decision to abandon the short-haul routes it had been operating from London Gatwick at low frequencies since 1978 and to surrender a number of unused licences to the CAA, BCal, Laker Airways and Dan-Air requested the CAA to transfer these licences to themselves.

BCal applied to take over BA's London Gatwick—Frankfurt route and its dormant Gatwick—Geneva licence. BCal was awarded licences for both routes.

The fairly liberal bilateral air services agreements between the UK and Germany as well as between the UK and Switzerland enabled BCal to commence double daily flights to Frankfurt and 10 services a week to Geneva within a relatively short time span following the award of the licences. This was the first time since 1974 that BCal was able to launch new routes from Gatwick to Europe. These were BCal's first scheduled services to Germany and Switzerland, which were going to be important sources of feeder traffic for the airline's long-haul services from Gatwick.

The launch of the two new routes coincided with the introduction of a dedicated business class cabin on all of BCal's short-haul flights to Europe, the first time the airline had offered two classes on its short-haul routes since its inception, with the exception of a brief period in the early 1970s during which it had offered a first class on the Gatwick—Paris route. BCal used the Executive Class brand for both its new European and its longer established long-haul business class.

== Falklands War and re-entry into the charter market ==
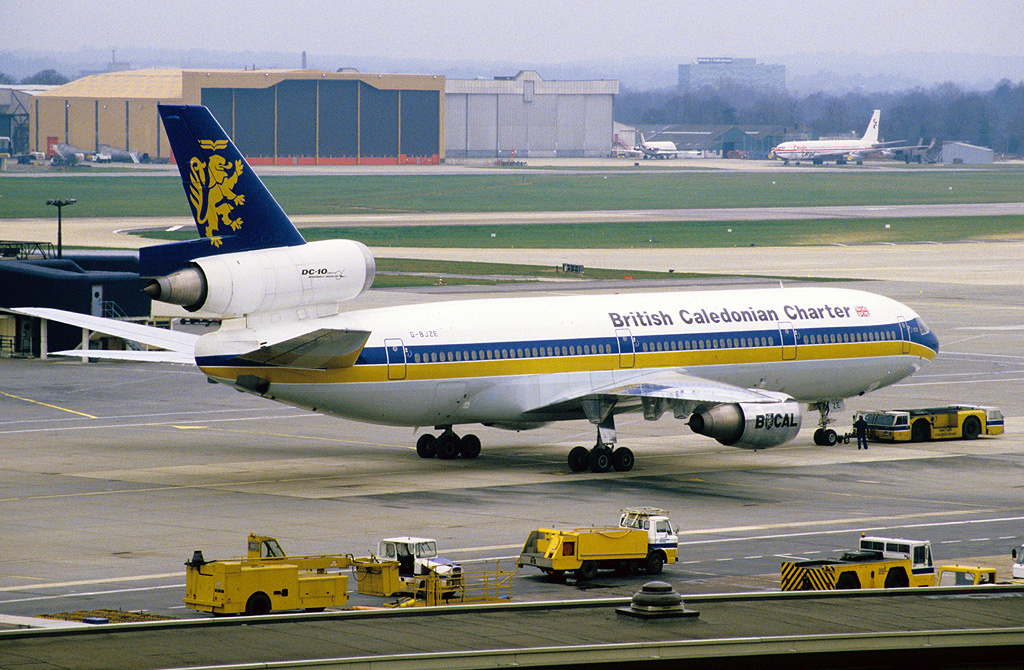
This British Caledonian Charter McDonnell Douglas DC-10-10 at Gatwick in March 1984 was one of two acquired from bankrupt Laker Airways in 1983.

The 1982 Falklands War was an unexpected, major setback for BCal. Argentina's decision to close its airspace and airports to all UK-based airlines as well as to all UK-registered aircraft and Peru's decision to follow suit resulted in the loss of the most profitable parts of BCal's South American network, especially Buenos Aires — its most profitable destination in that part of the world — and the lucrative "fifth freedom" traffic rights between Madrid and Buenos Aires. That conflict left the airline with an unprofitable rump network because the remaining routes to Brazil, Venezuela and Colombia did not generate sufficient traffic to be profitable on their own, even after a reduction in frequencies. Another negative consequence for BCal was that one of its eight McDonnell Douglas DC-10-30 widebodied jets suddenly became surplus to its long-haul scheduled requirements, forcing the airline to look for alternative work to increase long-haul fleet utilisation.

Laker Airways' collapse at the beginning of February of that year provided BCal with additional work to utilise its spare aircraft capacity.

Laker Airways' demise also enabled BCal to relaunch a daily service between Gatwick and Los Angeles, to acquire six aircraft from the failed carrier's estate and to move into the hangar it had occupied at Gatwick. The ex-Laker aircraft that joined BCal's fleet included two DC-10-10s and four BAC One-Eleven 300s. BCal used the DC-10-10s to set up a new charter subsidiary named British Caledonian Airways Charter as a joint venture with the Rank Organisation The latter aircraft and three second-hand One-Eleven 500s that had been acquired from other sources replaced BCal's seven, ageing One-Eleven 200s.

Despite being a difficult year for BCal, it managed to stay in the black during that period. The airline made a pre-tax profit of £1.1 million, which translated into a £300,000 retained profit, in the financial year to 31 October 1982.

== Launching a new narrow-bodied aircraft ==
In 1983, BCal became the first non-French airline to order the Airbus A320. BCal placed a firm order for seven A320s and took an option on another three, with deliveries of the aircraft on firm order due to commence during the spring of 1988. The options were subsequently converted into firm orders as well.

Although the A320 was bigger than BCal's actual requirement, it was the technologically advanced contender with 27% lower seat-mile costs than the BAC One-Eleven. Airbus offered BCal a discount to sign up as a launch customer. Having BCal co-launch a brand-new narrow-bodied aircraft gave the manufacturer added credibility in its global sales campaigns. This was of particular importance in the US market, which Airbus needed to penetrate with its new aircraft if it wanted to compete with Boeing which had dominated this market segment with the 737 for over 15 years.

BCal intended to use its A320s to replace the ageing One-Elevens on its short-haul European and medium-haul North African routes.

1983 turned out to be another tough year for BCal. Continuing restrictions on the airline's South American services and other schedule cutbacks in response to the early 80s recession reduced aircraft utilisation. This led to a decision to fill spare long-haul aircraft capacity with third-party work. BCal's third-party business included a twice weekly Gatwick—Luxembourg—Barbados service on behalf of Caribbean Airways, weekly Gatwick—Frankfurt—Mahé services under contract to Air Seychelles and a wet lease agreement with Surinam Airways to operate a weekly Paramaribo—Gatwick—Amsterdam service. The Caribbean Airways and Air Seychelles contracts used spare capacity on BCal's DC-10-30s, while the Surinam Airways wet lease utilised the ex-Laker DC-10-10s operated by British Caledonian Charter. Although BCal's airline operation incurred a loss of £655,000 in the financial year to 31 October 1983, the airline managed to make an overall pre-tax profit of £2.6 million. This translated into a £300,000 retained profit at group level.

== Reorganisation and improved industrial relations ==
During the early 1980s, BCal and its affiliated companies adopted a new organisational structure to reflect the growth in the group's business and the diversification into new activities. Caledonian Aviation Group (renamed British Caledonian Group in 1986) became the new holding company. It had an issued share capital of £20 million in June 1987. Apart from the airline, subsidiaries included British Caledonian Aircraft Trading, British Caledonian Flight Training, British Caledonian Helicopters, Caledonian Airmotive, Caledonian Hotel Holdings and Caledonian Leisure Holdings.

In addition, this was the time BCal, which had always prided itself on its industrial relations record, claiming it never lost a full day's operation as a result of industrial action began implementing a new co-operative, industrial relations strategy. The airline termed its new industrial relations strategy "The Way Ahead". This strategy was designed to make the airline the most productive among its peers in Europe by redefining established working practices. Its aim was to achieve a significant reduction in labour costs through increased productivity, thereby putting the firm ahead of its rivals. It was hoped that this would ultimately translate into higher profits as well.

The strategy sought to gain acceptance (among eligible BCal employees) by offering them a higher basic rate of pay and a greater personal involvement in the management's decision-making process in return for forgoing overtime pay and agreeing to new, more efficient working practices that resulted in increased labour productivity.

The successful implementation of the new industrial relations strategy in 1983 made BCal employees the highest paid airline staff in the UK at the time.

== A major shakeup ==
In 1984, the UK Government began to prepare then wholly state-owned BA for privatisation in earnest by appointing a new board of directors with several years' experience in private industry and by changing its legal status from a Crown Corporation to a public limited company. BCal's senior management saw this as a major threat to the company's continuing existence as the UK's second largest international scheduled airline. According to BCal's own calculations, the relevant figures for 1983 had shown that BA alone accounted for 83% of all UK scheduled airline capacity measured in tonne kilometers as opposed to a mere 13–14% for BCal. These figures also showed that BA carried seven-and-a-half times as many passengers as BCal, (Note: 83% vs. 11% of all scheduled UK airline passengers) and that Heathrow's share of international scheduled air traffic was five-and-a-half times greater than Gatwick's (79% and 14% respectively). This meant that a privatised BA on this scale would enjoy far greater financial clout than BCal. It also meant that BA's market power would be disproportionate compared with that of any other UK airline as a result of its much greater economies of scale. Furthermore, the Government's decision to proceed with BA's privatisation inevitably meant the end of the "Second Force" policy, which had guided BCal's development since its inception. In addition, the transfer of BA's ownership from the public to the private sector meant that BCal could no longer rely on the indirect protection Government ownership afforded it to prevent BA from abusing its power — for example, by engaging in anti-competitive behaviour against BCal.

To redress this competitive imbalance, BCal proposed to the Government the transfer of several of BA's most lucrative long-haul routes to itself — including BA's profitable Saudi Arabian routes as well as that airline's routes (Note: including unused licences) to Abu Dhabi, Kuwait, Harare, Islamabad, Kolkata, Singapore, Kuala Lumpur, Tokyo, Seoul and Beijing. BCal also proposed the transfer of BA's short-/medium-haul routes from Heathrow to Vienna, Helsinki, Athens, Istanbul, Malta and Larnaca, which it wanted to serve from Gatwick, and the removal of capacity restrictions on its existing short-haul European routes from Gatwick. The airline furthermore proposed to take over BA's services from Gatwick to the Iberian Peninsula and that airline's services from Gatwick to the Caribbean. Moreover, BCal wanted the Government to pursue additional opportunities for dual designation in its [re-]negotiations of existing and new bilateral air services agreements with foreign governments on its behalf — in particular, to the Far East and Australia as well as to East and South Africa and Canada at a later stage. BCal was prepared to pay BA between £200 million and £250 million for the routes to be transferred as well as for the associated staff and infrastructure. BCal estimated that it would require nine more aircraft — six long-haul and three short-haul planes — to operate the additional routes. It also reckoned that this would allow it to grow to the minimum size that was required to turn its Gatwick base into an efficient hub to enable it to prosper in the post-BA privatisation environment. BCal was furthermore of the opinion that this would allow it to increase its scheduled capacity to about 20% of all UK scheduled airline capacity while permitting BA to continue in its role as the dominant UK scheduled carrier, which would still have accounted for 70% of total scheduled capacity.

BCal's senior management told the Government that the only alternatives to this proposal were shifting its existing scheduled operation from Gatwick to Heathrow's then new Terminal 4, which it expected to produce an additional annual profit of at least £20 million in the first year itself, or to merge with BA. BCal's senior management also told the Government that its preferred option was to remain at Gatwick and to strengthen its position there through the proposed route transfers to enable BCal to turn it into an efficient hub-and-spoke operation that would allow it to compete with BA and the giant US carriers on a level playing field. The airline's senior management furthermore told the Government that a merger with BA was its least preferred option.

Lord King of Wartnaby, BA's newly appointed chairman, infamously dismissed BCal's offer to purchase BA's assets for £200 million + as a "smash-and-grab raid". He made it clear to the Government that he and his fellow board members opposed transferring any of these assets to BCal. Lord King also left the Government in no doubt that it would find itself in the embarrassing situation of having to dismiss the entire board if it imposed a route transfer to BCal against the BA board's will.

In June 1984, BCal's original proposal to share out BA's routes ahead of the latter's privatisation was followed up by a plan BCal had jointly formulated with eight other UK independent airlines. This plan sought to give the independents a greater share of the UK's air transport market by reducing BA's share. Measured in terms of capacity tonne kilometres (CTKs), it would have increased the independents' share from 17% to 40% while reducing BA's share from 83% to 60%. For BCal alone this would have doubled its share from 15% to 30%. In their submission the independents claimed that privatising BA in its existing shape would allow it to dominate and destroy its competition. They also regarded BA's continuing dominance as incompatible with the CAA's goal of a less-regulated air transport market. BA countered the independents' contentions by maintaining that rather than benefiting consumers through increased competition, the independents' intent generally, and BCal's in particular, would merely result in substituting its own services with those of other carriers.

The opposing views of Britain's leading independent airlines on one hand and BA on the other regarding the future shape of the British air transport industry led to a review of the Government's airline competition policy by the CAA. The result was CAP 500, a Government-commissioned White Paper in which the CAA outlined the findings of its review of existing UK airline competition policy. CAP 500 also contained a number of recommendations that were designed to ensure that a competitive balance between BCal and the UK's other independent airlines on one hand and a privatised BA on the other was maintained.

The CAA broadly endorsed BCal's proposals by recommending the transfer of BA's routes to Saudi Arabia and Harare as well as its Caribbean and Iberian peninsula routes to BCal. The CAA also recommended removing all capacity restrictions on BCal's existing short-haul European routes. It furthermore advocated increasing the opportunities for designating BCal as the second UK flag carrier on additional long-haul routes where BA was the only UK scheduled airline. This was to be achieved through appropriate amendments to the relevant bilateral agreements.

Full implementation of CAP 500 would have resulted in strengthening BCal's position at Gatwick by making it the sole UK scheduled airline on all trunk routes from that airport while maintaining BA's status as the dominant UK scheduled carrier at Heathrow.

In the event, under pressure from BA's board and to ensure BA's successful flotation, the Government decided not to accept the CAA's recommendations in full. Instead, it settled on a limited route transfer from BA to BCal. This entailed transferring BA's profitable Saudi Arabian routes to Dhahran and Jeddah to BCal to add to its new route to the Saudi capital Riyadh. The Government thought that this would strengthen BCal by making it the sole UK flag carrier to all of Saudi Arabia and that it would tie in well with BCal's "linking the oil capitals of the world" corporate strategy, which it had successfully pursued since the late 1970s. To be seen as even-handed by both parties and to counter BA's accusations of displaying favouritism towards BCal, the Government required BCal to hand over to BA its loss-making South American routes as well as its unused licences to serve a number of additional destinations in the US and Morocco.

The limited route transfer on which the Government had decided was far less ambitious than either BCal's own proposals or the CAA's recommendations and would still leave it far smaller than BA and the giant US carriers. Although this was less than it had bargained for, BCal's senior management decided to accept the Government's decision because they estimated the two Saudi Arabian routes BA was going to transfer to be worth £18 million in additional annual profits. This would be only £2 million less than what BCal expected to earn in extra yearly profits from its existing network had it been able to transfer its entire operation to Heathrow. Given these magnitudes and Heathrow's already tight slot situation at peak times, BCal's senior management considered this difference in annual profitability immaterial.

The route transfer was to take place at the start of the 1985 summer timetable period.

== Reaching new heights ==
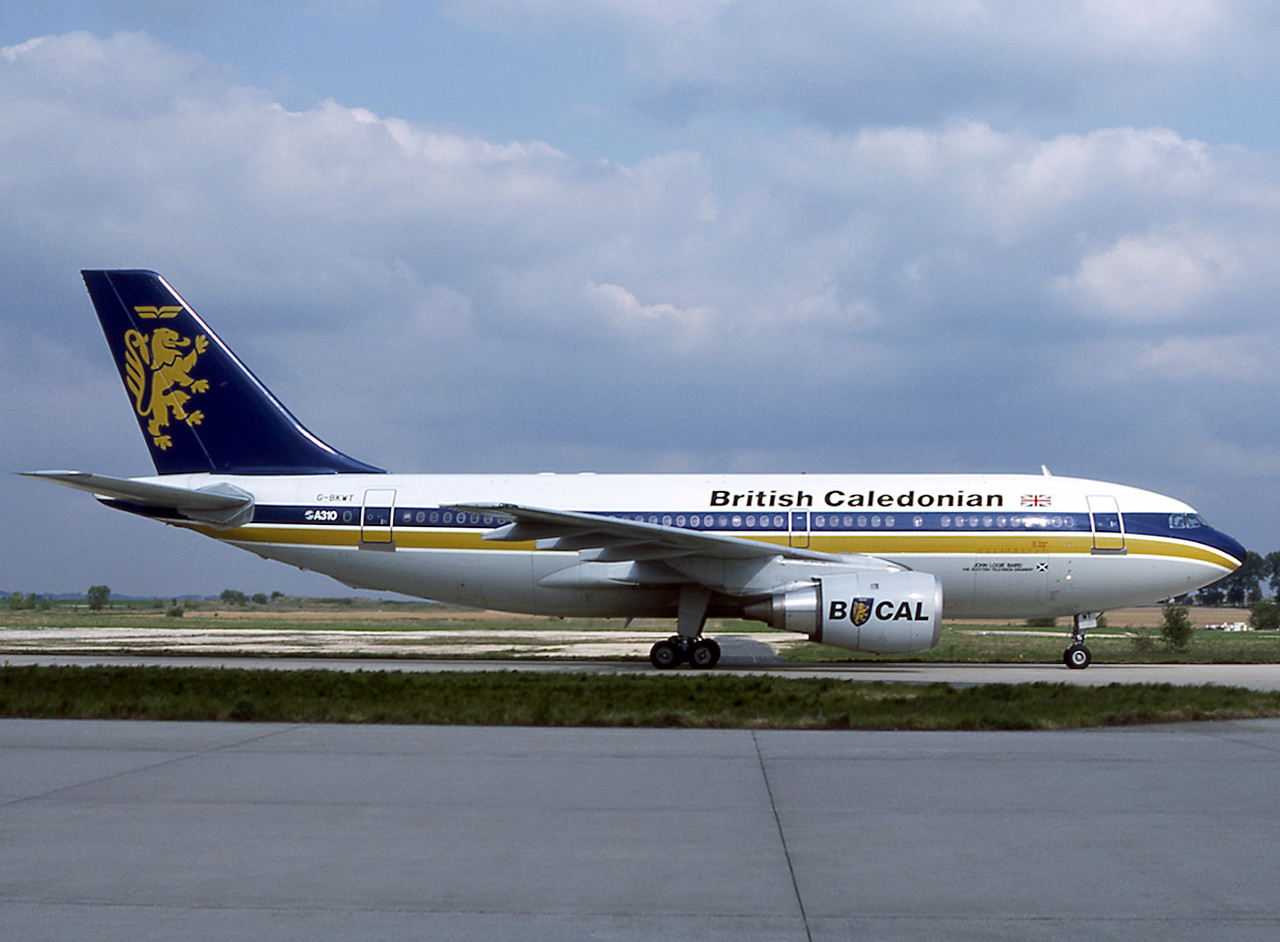
A BCal Airbus A310-200 seen at Paris Charles de Gaulle in May 1984.

1984 was a record year for BCal. It ended the financial year to 31 October 1984 with a pre-tax profit of £17.1 million, which surpassed the record financial performance of 1978. This translated into a £10.9 million retained profit at group level. These profits were the result of improvements in the British economy, which had recovered from the severe recession of the early 1980s, and BCal beginning to reap the benefits of the new industrial relations strategy it had begun implementing the year before.

Also in 1984, BCal received two brand-new A310-200 widebodies at its Gatwick base.

In 1984, the CAA awarded BCal a licence to commence scheduled services from Gatwick to Riyadh and authorised the airline to operate dedicated scheduled services to Abu Dhabi, Doha, Dubai and Muscat, rather than serving these destinations as intermediate points only.

Libreville was added to the network during 1984. At the start of the summer timetable period, frequencies to Frankfurt and Geneva increased to three daily round-trips. Connectair and RFG joined the British Caledonian Commuter scheme adding new, regional feeder routes from Gatwick to Antwerp and Paderborn. Connectair also assumed the operation of BCal's Gatwick—Brussels route. BCal furthermore decided to withdraw its Glasgow—Newcastle—Amsterdam regional service to focus its operations on providing worldwide scheduled services from London only.

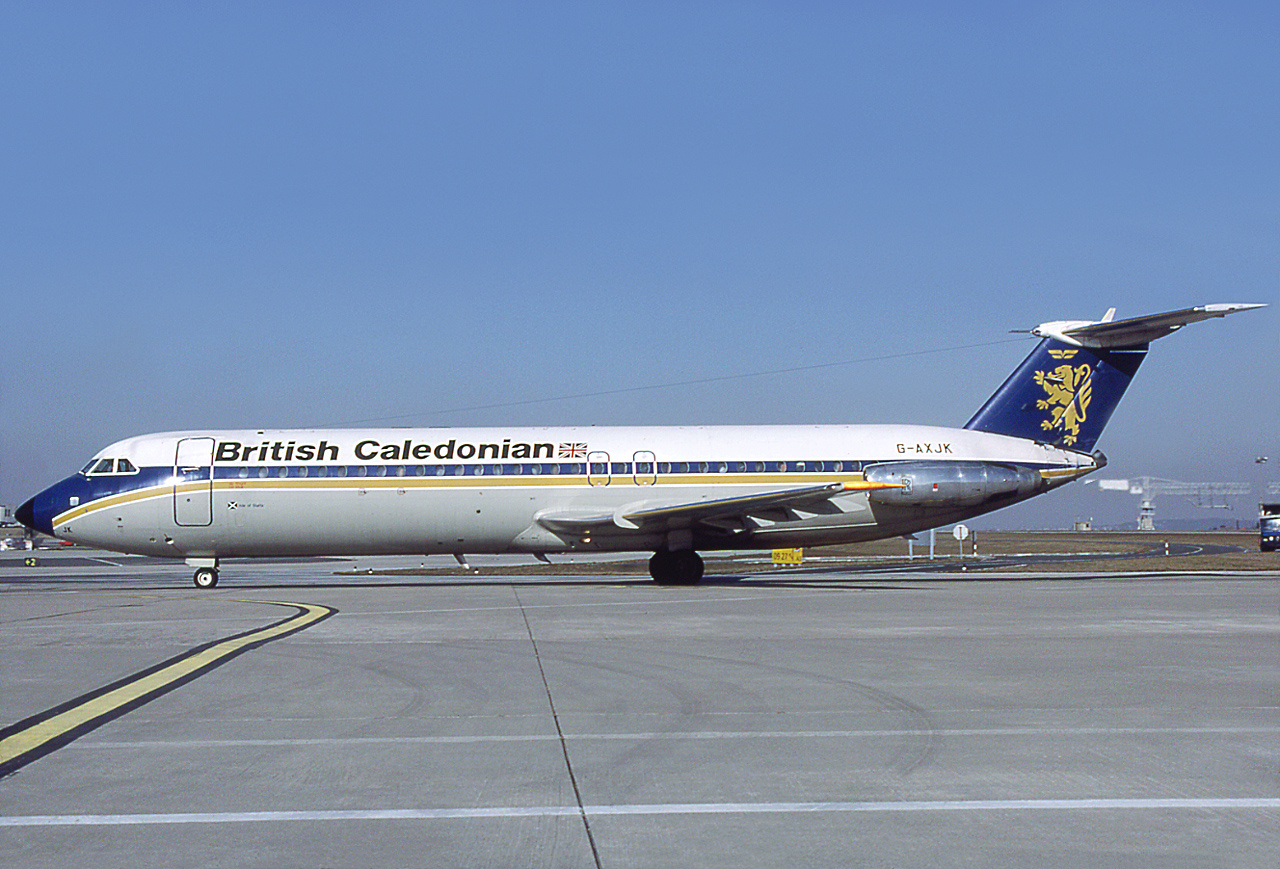
Seen here at Paris Charles de Gaulle in February 1985, this former British United BAC One-Eleven 500 was among 13 BCal hush-kitted in the mid-1980s.

BCal decided to retire the four ex-Laker One-Eleven 300s and to acquire another second-hand One-Eleven 500, giving it a total fleet strength of 13. Standardizing its short-haul, narrow-bodied fleet on the same aircraft sub-type enhanced its ability to interchange aircraft across that fleet. As part of a "mid-life update", of its entire One-Eleven fleet, hush kits were fitted to comply with stricter, post-1985 noise abatement rules. This was to keep the One-Eleven effective until more modern aircraft were delivered in 1988.

1984 also marked the end of the long-haul, narrow-bodied era for BCal when the last Boeing 707 left its fleet.

1985 was the year that broke all previous financial records at BCal. The pre-tax profit in the financial year to 31 October 1985 reached an all-time high of £21.4 million. The retained group profit for that period was £11.3 million. The profit attributable to BCal's airline operation represented an improvement of almost £12 million compared with the previous year's results. During that year, BCal carried 8% more passengers and 20% more cargo compared with the year before.

The limited route transfer on which BCal had agreed with BA and the Government took effect at the start of the 1985 summer timetable period, when BCal commenced scheduled operations from Gatwick to Dhahran and Jeddah, replacing the BA service from Heathrow. At the same time, BCal relinquished its traffic rights to Recife, Salvador, Rio, São Paulo, San Juan, Caracas and Bogotá. BA acquired these traffic rights and began serving most of these destinations from Heathrow.

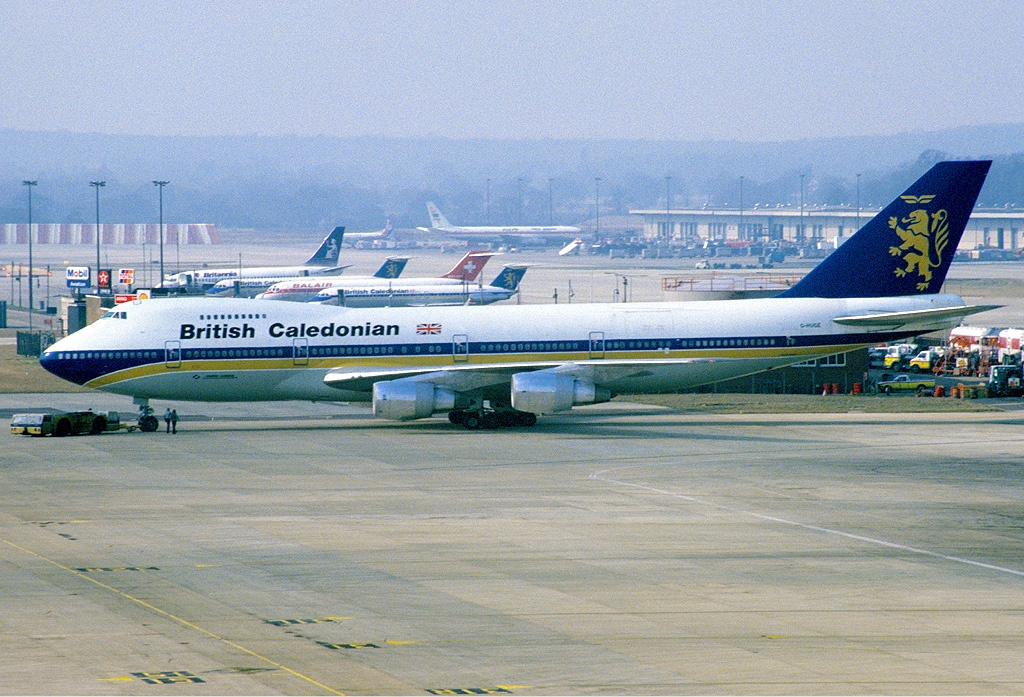
Seen here at London Gatwick in March 1986, BCal used this former Royal Jordanian Boeing 747-200M for its summer 1985 Gatwick–JFK re-launch, including a door-to-door limousine service at both ends.

A second 747 wearing BCal's full livery joined the fleet permitting the resumption of a daily service between Gatwick and New York's John F. Kennedy Airport (JFK) during the summer of 1985, after the airline's absence from that route for over a decade. BCal's 1985 re-launch of scheduled Gatwick—JFK services coincided with the introduction of its door-to-door limousine service for premium travellers.

The temporary lease of a Viscount sporting the full BCal livery for the duration of the 1985 summer timetable period enabled the airline to increase capacity on the Gatwick—Brussels route by replacing smaller aircraft Connectair had used to operate that service under the British Caledonian Commuter scheme and to add more capacity on week-ends on the busy Gatwick—Jersey route.

Two more, second-hand DC-10-30s were acquired to replace BCal's A310s, which left the fleet when the additional DC-10s arrived.

1985 also saw the establishment of British Caledonian Flight Training, a new flight crew training facility.

As Gatwick became busier, BCal's senior management called on the Government to ban all charter flights from the airport and to move those services to Stansted.

The Government decided to meet BCal's request for a ban on all charter flights from Gatwick half-way by agreeing to give preference to scheduled services in all future slot allocations at the airport.

== A new airline for Europe ==
The collapse of the oil price during the mid-1980s had serious repercussions for BCal's revenue and profit projections as this impacted the oil-related business routes on which the airline had depended for most of its profits since the late 1970s. All of these routes carried fewer premium business travellers than anticipated. This in turn led to a sharp decline of those routes' profitability and, hence, their contribution to the airline's overall profitability. In the case of the newly acquired Saudi Arabian routes this meant that they delivered less than half the projected profits.

The limited route transfer had allowed BCal to grow its scheduled capacity to about 18% of all UK scheduled airline capacity, while BA only suffered an insignificant reduction in its share of total scheduled capacity.

BCal's 18% share was still far less than the minimum size BCal needed to acquire the economies of scale to compete with BA and the giant US carriers on a level playing field. This was also less than what had been envisaged in the Edwards report prior to BCal's formation. (Note: that report had considered 4 billion long-haul scheduled service seat miles (6.4 billion seat kilometres) per year by 1975 the minimum size for the "Second Force" to become economically viable)

This situation was unsatisfactory for the airline and unrewarding for its shareholders.

Therefore, under pressure from its controlling shareholder 3i, the search for a new, long-term strategy began.

As a consequence of its main shareholder's dissatisfaction, the British Caledonian Group's board of directors established contact with ILG's board in November 1985. The purpose of this meeting was to begin exploring ways of combining BCal's and Air Europe's separate short-haul operations in a new joint venture that would have enabled both airlines to acquire the economies of scale to compete with a privatised BA on a level playing field. Another objective of this exercise was to smooth out each other's peaks and troughs, for BCal's peaks occurred during week days while Air Europe's occurred on week-ends. This meant that both airlines could offer their spare capacities to each other to achieve an overall higher level of equipment utilisation and higher load factors throughout the week. ILG's dominant position in the inclusive tour market would also have helped BCal to significantly increase its generally low short-haul loads by filling seats that would otherwise remain empty with ILG's clients, especially on week-ends. A series of meetings ensued. The result was a 150-page study entitled An Airline for Europe. It envisaged the commencement of joint scheduled operations from Gatwick to Hamburg, Munich, Düsseldorf, Milan Linate and Nice in 1987. The next stage of development was to occur during the 1988/89 winter timetable period when further routes linking Gatwick with Copenhagen, Stockholm, Vienna, Rome and Athens were to be added. The study also envisaged adding services from Gatwick to Zürich, Dublin, Madrid and Lisbon at a later stage to enable the joint venture to acquire sufficient economies of scale to become a viable entity in the long term. However, it recognised that it might be difficult to implement the last stage of the envisaged expansion as the relevant routes had already been licensed to Dan-Air.

The study also made profit projections for each stage of the envisaged joint venture's development.

These were:

- £3.7 million for 1987/88.
- £5.5 million for 1988/89.
- £25.2 million for 1989/90.

The latter represented a return on total equity employed plus previously retained earnings of 18.2%. This was substantially better than BCal's short-haul operation could have hoped to achieve on its own.

Despite several rounds of talks being held that lasted well into the first half of 1986, both sides eventually decided not to proceed further with their joint venture study and to go their separate ways.

== Unexpected reversal of fortunes ==
BCal had high hopes for 1986. It expected to make record profits representing a substantial improvement on the previous year's pre-tax profits of £21.4 million. The British Caledonian Group expected its turnover to exceed half-a-billion pounds while BCal expected to carry just under two-and-a-half million passengers. The year's crowning glory was to be the flotation of the British Caledonian Group on the London Stock Exchange.

Instead, 1986 turned out to be BCal's "annus horribilis" during which it faced its most acute crisis as a result of events beyond its control. The airline was never going to recover from this crisis, which ultimately sealed the company's fate.

The events that brought about a dramatic turn-around in BCal's fortunes plunging it into a £19.3 million pre-tax loss (translated into a £14.4 million retained group loss). included

- the American bombings of Libya during April 1986 in retaliation for that country's (at the time) alleged involvement in the bombing of La Belle nightclub in West Berlin, which injured over 200 and killed three.
- the world's worst nuclear accident in Chernobyl in the then Ukrainian Soviet Socialist Republic on 26 April 1986
- the adverse impact of the devaluation of the Nigerian currency on BCal's earnings from passenger and freight bookings originating in Nigeria and paid for in the local currency, which the Nigerian government of the day prevented from being repatriated to the UK.

The first two events almost emptied the cabins of BCal's widebodied planes plying the transatlantic routes linking Gatwick with Houston, Dallas/Fort Worth, Atlanta, New York JFK and Los Angeles because of a sudden surge in cancellations, especially from passengers based in the US. Many of BCal's American passengers cancelled or postponed their trips at that time because they feared retaliatory attacks by Libyan secret service agents and did not want to risk exposing themselves to the radioactive fallout from the Ukrainian nuclear catastrophe while conducting their business or spending their holidays in Europe. At the time, BCal's transatlantic scheduled services accounted for a quarter of the airline's worldwide revenues and 37% of its passenger traffic. The Libyan bombings also dashed any hopes BCal had to resume operations on its profitable Gatwick—Tripoli route later that year, resulting in a further loss of expected revenues and profits.

The third had a serious impact on BCal's finances at a time of crisis as it denied the airline speedy access to a substantial amount of money derived from passenger and cargo sales in its most important and most profitable overseas market. This resulted in a significant revenue loss.

What was already a bad situation for the airline was made worse by the continuing decline of the oil price, which had started the year before. The rapid fall in the oil price reduced the oil industry's spending power, thereby significantly reducing the number of oil-related business passengers planning to fly with BCal in future. As these passengers used to account for a major share of the airline's high-yield premium bookings, future revenue and profit projections needed to be revised as well to take account of much reduced demand for the company's most expensive tickets.

In addition, the Government announced the withdrawal of BCal's licence to operate the high-frequency Gatwick—Heathrow Airlink helicopter shuttle service as a result of the completion of the M25 London orbital motorway, thereby denying the airline's passengers easy access to connecting flights from Heathrow and depriving passengers travelling with airlines based at that airport of the opportunity to avail themselves of convenient onward connections from Gatwick. The resulting reduction in the number of passengers changing flights at BCal's Gatwick base had a detrimental effect on load factors on the airline's profitable long-haul routes. This in turn reduced the profitability of these routes, as well as the airline's overall profitability by an estimated £2 million per annum.

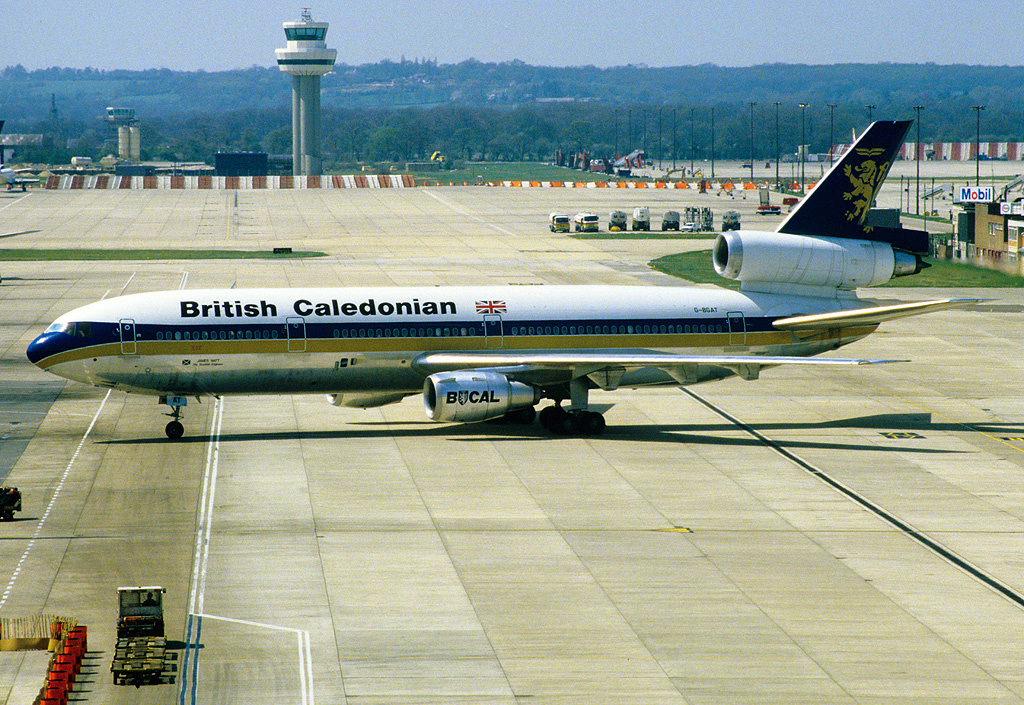
Seen here at London Gatwick in April 1984, McDonnell Douglas DC-10-30 G-BGAT was one of the aircraft BCal sold to Continental Airlines in 1986.

As a result of the problems it was facing during that time, BCal announced 1,000 job losses out of a total worldwide workforce of 7,700 which given there was no overall reduction in services Flight International described as suggesting "that the slim down was overdue" It also needed to make adjustments to its schedule to take account of the expected changes in traffic patterns. This led to an immediate reduction in the number of weekly frequencies on BCal's underperforming Saudi Arabian routes. The aircraft capacity released was redeployed on BCal's well-performing route to Dubai and Hong Kong. (Note: increasing the number of weekly round-trips from seven to nine)

Altogether BCal suffered a total revenue loss of £80 million (Note: £35 million for losses related to the US military action in Libya and the Ukrainian nuclear catastrophe, another £35 million related to the devaluation of the Nigerian currency and £10 million for the voluntary severance programme to achieve a reduction in the head count) while the airline itself lost two-and-a-half million pounds every month at that time.

The airline embarked upon a major asset disposal programme to compensate for this significant revenue loss and to have sufficient funds to keep the business running. These asset disposals included the profitable sale of two, relatively young McDonnell Douglas DC-10-30 widebodied aircraft to Continental Airlines, the sale and lease-back of the entire 13-strong, short-haul BAC One-Eleven fleet, the sale of six of Caledonian Hotel Holdings' hotels, (Note: including the sale of both Copthorne hotels to Aer Lingus) the sale of Caledonian Airmotive to US-based Ryder Systems, the sale of Caledonian Leisure Holdings and the disposal of British Caledonian Helicopters the following year.

Despite facing a major crisis, BCal continued adding new aircraft, routes and flight frequencies in an effort to maintain a competitive operation.

Two more 747s joined the fleet during 1986. This permitted a major capacity increase on the popular Gatwick—Dubai—Hong Kong route.

During that year, Muscat, Gaborone and Aberdeen joined the network.

BCal's acquisition of a fifth 747 the following year permitted the launch of a new route from Gatwick to Tokyo on 31 May 1987, at a frequency of three return flights per week. In addition, for the first time in five years, two new European routes were launched from Gatwick. These served Milan Linate and Nice at a frequency of 13 and three return flights per week, respectively.

== Merger discussions ==
By July 1987, BCal had already exhausted most of the proceeds from the asset disposal programme.

The proceeds from the sale of two DC-10s to Continental Airlines was all that was left to keep the airline in business. Senior management realised that the company was unlikely to survive on its own and that it needed to act fast if it wanted to avoid BCal's collapse.

Therefore, the search for a financially strong partner acquired a renewed sense of urgency.

Several rounds of talks that were aimed at achieving a full-scale merger ensued with various airlines in the UK, the US, Canada and Europe.

BCal's future prospects as a stand-alone, medium-sized airline operating a variety of short-, medium- and long-haul scheduled services were rapidly diminishing against a background of looming consolidation in the airline industry. This was driven by the giant US carriers that had begun channeling their traffic flows into powerful hub-and-spoke operations, rather than feeding these into the networks of BCal and other international partner airlines, in the wake of US deregulation. In addition, BA's impending privatisation and the Government's refusal to fully implement the recommendations contained in the CAA's airline competition White Paper meant that BCal was unable to acquire the economies of scale it needed to compete with these airlines on a level playing field. This prevented BCal from achieving higher volumes over which to spread its fixed costs. It also deprived the airline of the capacity to generate the funds to continue investing in fleet renewal, further network expansion and new information technology systems.

BCal's basic dilemma at the time can be summed up as follows:

It had grown into a mid-sized airline that was too large to succeed as a niche carrier, yet too small to compete effectively with British Airways and the major U.S. airlines on economies of scale and scope. At the same time, it could not match the significantly lower cost structures of rapidly expanding Far East competitors such as Cathay Pacific.

BCal's precarious financial position made it obvious for most of its rivals and seasoned industry observers that the ailing airline lacked the financial strength to survive on its own for much longer.

BCal had valuable traffic rights to operate scheduled services on a number of lucrative, long-haul routes to parts of the world that were not served by any other British airline at that time. It therefore became a desirable takeover target and a bidding war ensued between several potential suitors.

The chief protagonists in this takeover battle were BCal's archrival BA as well as ILG/Air Europe and SAS.

=== Proposed BA-BCal merger ===
On 16 July 1987, Sir Adam Thomson and Lord King of Wartnaby, chairmen of British Caledonian Group and British Airways respectively, surprisingly announced at a press conference the intention of the latter to acquire the former in an agreed £237 million bid. They had agreed on this deal only the day before. Officially this was presented as a "merger between equals" but within the industry it was widely acknowledged as a mutually agreed rescue deal to avoid the collapse of BCal. In addition, BA, which had been privatised only in February of that year, was keen to get hold of its main home-grown competitor's most valuable assets. These included BCal's lucrative traffic rights to those parts of the world BA could not serve itself as a result of the now defunct "Second Force" policy. This itself had resulted in a "spheres of influence" policy for BA and BCal that had prevented both airlines from competing with each other on a number of important long-haul routes. BA also saw this as a necessary move to fill the gaps in its global route map to acquire the economies of scale that would permit it to compete against the giant US carriers on a level-playing field. BCal's financial difficulties furthermore presented an opportunity for BA to forestall any competitive threat a revitalised BCal could pose to it in future, either on its own or in alliance with another airline. It therefore wanted to get hold of these assets before any competitor could lay its hands on them. Moreover, BA wanted to prevent BCal's assets from passing into the hands of any [partially] foreign-owned or controlled competitors. It felt that under such a scenario the long-term competitiveness of the entire UK air transport industry was threatened.

=== ILG/Air Europe's unsolicited counter bid ===
Following Sir Adam's outright rejection of ILG chairman Harry Goodman's offer to purchase BCal's short-haul operation, and to merge that operation with the short-haul operations of ILG subsidiary Air Europe in return for not having the proposed BA-BCal deal referred to the Monopolies and Mergers Commission (MMC), ILG decided at the end of July 1987 to launch a counter bid for the entire British Caledonian Group.

Air Europe was concerned that a new entity combining BA and BCal had the power to destroy the UK's remaining independent airlines, especially with regard to their ability to compete with such a behemoth. At the time, Air Europe had ambitions of its own to become a major short-haul scheduled operator. It was planning to launch 11 new routes from Gatwick to Europe, thereby replacing and enhancing the services BCal had provided. Given a combined BA-BCal's superior financial strength, considerably lower borrowing costs and far greater economies of scale, Air Europe's management felt that it would be imprudent to launch these new routes if it had to compete with BA out of Heathrow and Gatwick as well. Therefore, its parent ILG had decided to make a counter bid, which it hoped would either kill off BA's proposal to take over BCal lock, stock and barrel or result in it being referred to the MMC.

To enhance its credibility as a serious contender, Air Europe's bid contained a detailed proposal to return BCal to profitability by way of a reorganisation. This proposal had been prepared by a retired BA head of route planning whom ILG had specifically hired for this purpose. BCal would be split into four discrete businesses, each of which with its own management accountable for the performance of that unit. The businesses would be a long-haul operation under the BCal brand, a short-haul operation merged with Air Europe's existing short-haul operation using the BCal brand on business routes and the Air Europe brand in leisure markets, and an engineering and a ground handling unit.

The long-haul operation was to be re-equipped with a brand-new fleet comprising six Boeing 747-400s and 10 Boeing 767-300ERs to achieve a substantial reduction in operating costs and to permit an increase in frequencies. There were to be fewer services to Africa — where the new management wanted to keep only the really profitable routes to Nigeria and Ghana — while a second daily service to New York JFK was to be launched, Dubai was to be de-linked from the Hong Kong service and Hong Kong was to be served non-stop with the new 747-400s. In addition, there were to be more flights to the Middle East making use of unused licences to serve additional destinations in the region, which BCal had obtained during the early 1980s. There was also a plan to apply for traffic rights to serve other destinations in the Far East non-stop from Gatwick in competition with BA's existing services from Heathrow. This combination of more non-stop flights and higher frequencies to prime long-haul destinations would have resulted in a more attractive product for high-yield business travellers, thereby enabling the revamped BCal to become profitable again within a short period of time.

The short-haul operation was to have brand-new aircraft as well, which would have resulted in replacing BCal's ageing BAC One-Eleven 500s with the new Boeing 737-300s Air Europe had on order. It would also have resulted in adopting the Air Europe short-haul inflight product.

BCal's senior management rejected ILG's bid. They felt that both airlines' nature of operations and their business strategies were incompatible and that therefore there were no synergies to be gained from combining BCal with what was in their opinion "essentially a charter company".

=== Other contenders ===
The October 1987 stock market crash and ILG's successful referral of the original BA-BCal merger proposal to the MMC resulted in BA tabling a revised bid to take over BCal. The fall in BA's stock value left BA's original offer worth £156.7 million and a condition of MMC approval was that BCal had to give up some routes reducing its value to BA. BA's materially inferior offer to buy out the shareholders of the British Caledonian Group led to BCal's senior management turn against BA and to recommend to their shareholders not to accept the revised bid. Instead, with the backing of BCal's controlling shareholder 3i, a desperate search for a "white knight", who was prepared to pay the same amount of money BA had offered to pay in its original bid, began.

Talks with British Midland, UTA and SAS ensued. Among these sets of talks the one with SAS seemed to be the most promising.

Had parallel talks to merge with UTA, at the time the largest wholly private airline in France and the closest French equivalent to a "Second Force", succeeded, this would have resulted in a near perfect fit of both airlines' long-haul networks as these were largely complementary. It would also have given UTA, an exclusively long-haul carrier at the time, access to BCal's short-haul network. This could have delivered additional passengers transferring at UTA's Paris Charles de Gaulle base between that airline's long-haul services and BCal's short-haul feeder flights from/to London Gatwick. However, at the time the French authorities were thought to disapprove of establishing an equity link between any of their airlines and a foreign carrier.

Parallel talks with British Midland, which wanted to transfer all of BCal's scheduled services from Gatwick to Heathrow, ended without result at an early stage because BCal's senior management felt that this was not feasible given the tight slot situation at London's premier airport.

BCal maintained that it had held several rounds of exploratory talks concerning the airline's potential takeover with a number of US carriers that were willing to pay a substantial premium over BA's original bid to acquire BCal. These talks had come to nothing because the US carriers feared that there were insurmountable regulatory obstacles to such a cross-border acquisition in the highly regulated airline industry.

==== SAS's emergence as a potential "white knight" ====
SAS was prepared to offer £110 million for 26% of the British Caledonian Group's stock, valuing the entire group at £400 million. Jan Carlzon, the then chairman of the SAS group, was well aware that so-called "nationality clauses" in most bilateral air services agreements and most countries' legal framework regulating the ownership of their airlines would restrict SAS's direct involvement in BCal's finances to acquiring a minority stake in its holding company. SAS therefore dispatched a team of executives headed by Jan Carlzon to the UK to work out details of a joint bid. This envisaged setting up an employee trust fund that would hold the same percentage of British Caledonian Group stock on behalf of the group's employees as SAS itself was seeking to acquire, so as to be compliant with any rules limiting the stakes foreign individuals or entities could own in a British airline. They were prepared to extend a loan to the trustees of the envisaged employee trust fund to enable them to acquire an equal number of shares on the employees' behalf. Goldman Sachs, the investment bank that worked on SAS's bid for 26% of the British Caledonian Group's common stock, proposed this to be structured as a so-called "exploding share". This would have enabled SAS to increase its holding in British Caledonian Group plc to a maximum of 40% through subsequent acquisition of additional non-voting shares. These in turn would have become ordinary shares following greater market liberalisation. The SAS executives discussed these ideas with BCal's senior management and the unions representing its staff at the British Caledonian Group's Crawley headquarters as well as with Government officials in London.

SAS faced a barrage of hostile propaganda and delaying tactics from BA that were designed to stall any third party's competing bid to acquire BCal for as long as possible and got a mixed response to its planned counter bid for BCal from various departments of the UK Government.

To counter these negative sentiments, SAS's proposals also included a plan to offer Dan-Air to participate in its merger with BCal by merging its scheduled services division with the new airline combine's scheduled operation, thereby strengthening its position at Gatwick and the airport as a hub.

SAS's rationale for launching a counter bid for BCal was the airline's desire not to be left behind in the then widely expected scramble for consolidation in the airline industry by becoming part of one of the four or five global airline groupings that were predicted to dominate the entire industry.

SAS thought that BCal's Gatwick base would give it access to a centrally located hub in the world's biggest international air travel market, thereby helping it to overcome its geographic isolation on the margins of Northern Europe. It also thought that BCal's lucrative long-haul routes from Gatwick to Africa and the Middle East would give it access to markets it could not profitably serve itself from relatively sparsely populated Scandinavia, and that this would make a good fit with its short-haul European routes — especially its comprehensive schedule to the UK from Scandinavia. SAS furthermore thought that by agreeing to transfer these services from Heathrow to Gatwick, it could also help solve BCal's long-standing problem of not operating enough short-haul flights to improve its long-haul loads from Gatwick.

== Takeover by British Airways ==
On 11 December, the CAA told SAS that it needed a British investor to match the SAS bid or the CAA would recommend to the Department of Trade and Industry that BCal no longer qualified as a British airline and the trade secretary indicated to the House of Commons that in that case he would be likely to revoke BCal's licences.

To counter SAS proposals, BA made an alternative cash offer of £200 million for all of BCal's stock (equivalent to 972 pence per share) while also leaving the alternative of 80 million BA shares still open.

Faced with the prospect of its takeover target being snatched away from under its nose by SAS, British Airways initially began resorting to bullying tactics. In this it had the implicit backing of Lord Tebbit, then a prominent cabinet member of Britain's ruling Conservative Party, who publicly referred to SAS as "Viking raiders".

BA was using a mix of rational and emotive arguments to convince both the regulators and the shareholders of the British Caledonian Group that its revised offer was in their best, long-term interest.

At the time, SAS used to pursue a high-fares-high-yield strategy in its Danish, Norwegian and Swedish home markets. BA argued that the SAS bid for BCal would lead to higher fares and thus would not benefit British consumers. In addition, BA also argued that BCal's takeover by SAS, in which the governments of Denmark, Norway and Sweden jointly held a 50% stake (Note: through each government's 50% ownership of its respective national carrier, each of which held the actual traffic rights that formed the legal basis of SAS's domestic, regional and international operations) at that time, effectively represented a back-door nationalisation of a significant part of Britain's privatised air transport industry and contrasted this with its own, recent privatisation. In this context, BA highlighted that two of these governments represented countries — Norway and Sweden — that were not even members of the European Economic Community (EEC) at that time and therefore were not bound by moves to liberalise its member states' air transport markets. BA furthermore argued that this would call into question BCal's international traffic rights as most bilateral air services agreements contained a clause demanding airlines to be substantially owned and controlled by interests based in the countries they represented, and went on to argue that this could force the British Government to make concessions to its overseas counterparts that were not in the interest of the British air transport industry to preserve BCal's UK flag carrier status. BA moreover backed up its arguments with the threat that it would immediately apply to the CAA to have all of BCal's licences to operate scheduled air services revoked. BA based these threats on a clause in the 1982 Civil Aviation Act, which states that any airline claiming UK flag carrier status must be substantially owned and controlled by individuals who are UK nationals or entities whose headquarters are located in the UK.

In the event, the British Caledonian Group's controlling shareholder 3i decided to accept BA's final £250 million offer which it presented on 21 December 1987 with the proviso that it needed to be accepted or rejected that day. As the uncertainty surrounding BCal's future led to a further, significant deterioration of its financial position (Note: resulting in a £32 million loss prior to being taken over by BA) and BA's final bid trumped SAS, the fiduciary responsibilities of the British Caledonian Group's board towards their shareholders meant that the only option left was to recommend the acceptance of the BA bid. 3i and the other shareholders decided to sell their stakes in British Caledonian Group plc to British Airways relinquishing control of BCal.

Following BA's successful takeover of BCal, SAS had a giant hoarding erected at the entrance to Heathrow's central area featuring an advertisement that ended with BCal's famous 1980s marketing slogan we never forget you have a choice.

The referral of BA's original bid to take over the entire British Caledonian Group to the MMC had resulted in the imposition of several conditions before the proposed deal was allowed to go ahead. These included BA releasing a minimum of 5,000 annual slots BCal had held at Gatwick (Note: at the time, BCal held just under one-fifth of all Gatwick slots) to competitors and requiring it to surrender to the CAA several of BCal's licences to operate scheduled services from Gatwick on a number of important, short-haul feeder routes. Although BA had been permitted to re-apply for these licences, the CAA decided to re-allocate all of them to rival airlines.

BA also needed to withdraw the objections to Air Europe's application to the CAA for licences to launch new scheduled services on several short-haul routes BCal already used to serve from Gatwick. (Note: BCal had lodged these with the CAA at the time Air Europe had submitted its application)

Furthermore, both companies' combined turnover exceeded the minimum threshold that automatically triggers the referral of a proposed merger between two or more companies that conduct a significant part or all of their business in EU member states to the European competition authorities in Brussels. Therefore, the Competition Directorate of the European Commission (EC) needed to clear BA's takeover of BCal as well.

In addition to the conditions imposed by the MMC, BA agreed further concessions with the EC's Competition Directorate to prevent BA from abusing its dominant position at both of London's main airports. These included limiting BA's presence at Gatwick to a maximum of 25% of all available slots, relinquishing BCal's unused route licences and to not oppose Air Europe's designation as an additional UK flag carrier on Gatwick—Rome. BA also had to give a legally binding undertaking that it would not seek to increase its share of Gatwick slots above 25% through any additional acquisitions of other airlines and/or their slots until 1992. These measures were primarily intended as safeguards for other airlines that required access to a sufficient number of attractive slots at Gatwick to launch viable scheduled services in competition with BA. Otherwise, BA's dominant position at both of London's main airports would have made it virtually impossible for the much smaller independents to replace and enhance capacity lost as a result of BCal's takeover, especially on routes where BCal had competed with BA and which accounted for more than half of its net revenue earned from scheduled services.

Air UK was awarded the licences for BCal's former London—Scotland trunk routes from Gatwick to Glasgow and Edinburgh. Dan-Air obtained the licences for the old BCal routes from Gatwick to Manchester and Aberdeen (Note: via Manchester) as well as from Gatwick to Paris Charles de Gaulle and Nice. The licence for BCal's Gatwick—Brussels route was transferred to Air Europe. The CAA also granted Air Europe permission to increase the frequency on its existing route between Gatwick and Paris Charles de Gaulle, where it had already competed with BCal, so that it could match Dan-Air's frequency. Both Air Europe and Connectair were successful in their applications for BCal's unused European route licences.

BA continued serving the routes until the new licence holders were ready to assume operations at the start of the 1988/89 winter timetable period.

BCal ceased to exist as a legal entity at 00.01 hrs. on 14 April 1988.

Cal Air International, (Note: when the Rank Organisation gained full control of Cal Air on 25 May 1988, its name changed to Novair International Airways, followed by the replacement of BCal's lion rampant with a shooting star logo on the aircraft's tails) the former British Caledonian Charter operation, and British Caledonian Flight Training were not included in BA's acquisition of the British Caledonian Group.

British Airtours, BA's wholly owned, Gatwick-based charter subsidiary, was rebranded Caledonian Airways. The aircraft were repainted in a variation of BA livery with BCal's lion rampant on the aircraft fins and cabin crew members taking to wearing the tartan.

BA replaced the former BCal short-haul fleet of 13 BAC One-Eleven 500s with 14 Boeing 737-200 Advanced. (Note: some of these aircraft had originally been operated by British Airtours in a high-density, single-class configuration and had subsequently been re-fitted with a two-class, scheduled interior)

The One-Elevens were transferred to BA's regional bases in Birmingham and Manchester.

The five second-hand 747s BA had inherited from BCal were replaced with its own 747-100/200s. (Note: at the time, BA already had two 747s stationed at Gatwick to operate its Caribbean schedules from there)

In addition, BA stationed three Lockheed L-1011 Tristar widebodied aircraft at Gatwick, which were used to operate the former BCal West African coastal schedule as well as a number of new routes to North Africa and the Middle East that had been transferred to Gatwick from Heathrow.

The only former BCal aircraft BA kept for its Gatwick operation were eight McDonnell Douglas DC-10-30s that had formed BA's erstwhile competitor's core long-haul fleet.

BA transferred the former BCal routes to Tokyo and Saudi Arabia to Heathrow. To compensate for this loss and to utilise its full slot allocation at Gatwick, BA moved its routes to Amman, Bermuda, Cairo, Khartoum, Larnaca, Luxor and Nassau to Gatwick, and routed a new Manchester—London—Islamabad service via Gatwick instead of Heathrow. (Note: as originally planned prior to BA's takeover of BCal)

BA transferred all of its international operations from Gatwick — including those it had inherited from BCal — to the then brand-new North Terminal, (Note: the domestic services BA had inherited from BCal at Gatwick continued using the South Terminal as the North Terminal lacked the facilities to handle domestic flights in those days) which opened in March 1988.

Delivery of the A320s BCal had ordered in 1983 began arriving at BA's new Gatwick base during the spring of 1988. These aircraft had been painted in BA's contemporary Landor Associates designed livery. BA operated its first commercial A320 service between London Gatwick and Geneva before transferring the entire A320 fleet to its main base at Heathrow later that year.

== Notes and citations ==
Notes

Citations

Bibliography

- Thomson, Sir Adam; High Risk: The Politics of the Air, 1990, Sidgwick and Jackson, London.
