= Skyways =

Skyways may refer to:

- Skyway, walk bridge
- Skyways (British airline), defunct British airline also known as Skyways Limited
- Skyways (Swedish airline), defunct Swedish airline also known as Skyways Express
- Skyways (TV series), Australian TV serial broadcast 1979-1981
- Skyways Coach-Air
