= Lympne Airport =

Airport in the United Kingdom

Lympne Airport Ashford Airport
- IATA: LYM; ICAO: EGMK

Summary
- Airport type: Closed
- Operator: Royal Flying Corps (1916–1918); Royal Air Force (1918–1919) civil (1919–1939); Fleet Air Arm (1939–1940); Royal Air Force (1940–1946) civil (1946–1984)
- Serves: Ashford, Kent, Hythe, Kent
- Location: Lympne
- Built: 1916
- In use: 1916–1984
- Elevation AMSL: 351 ft (107 m)
- Coordinates: 51°05′N 001°01′E

Map
- Location in Kent

Runways
Direction	Length		Surface
Direction	ft	m	Surface
~~02/20~~	~~4,500~~	~~1,372~~	~~Grass~~ (1916–1968); ~~Concrete~~ (1968–1984)

Lympne Airport /ˈlɪm/ was a military and later civil airfield (IATA: LYM, ICAO: EGMK), at Lympne, Kent, United Kingdom, which operated from 1916 to 1984. The airfield was built out of necessity in the First World War. During the First World War RFC Lympne was originally an acceptance point for aircraft being delivered to, and returning from, France but was later designated as a First Class Landing Ground, RAF Lympne. It became a civil airfield in 1919 and saw the operation of early air mail services after the 1918 armistice. It was one of the first four airfields in the United Kingdom with customs facilities.

Lympne was also involved in the evolution of air traffic control, with facilities developing and improving during the 1920s and 1930s. A number of record-breaking flights originated or ended at Lympne. During the 1920s Lympne was the venue for the Lympne light aircraft trials from which a number of aircraft types entered production. Air racing was also held at Lympne.

Just before the Second World War, Lympne was requisitioned by the Fleet Air Arm. It was named HMS Buzzard and renamed HMS Daedalus II three months later, before being transferred to the Royal Air Force in May 1940. During the war Lympne was a front-line fighter base, RAF Lympne. It was heavily bombed during the Battle of Britain in 1940 and put out of action for a number of weeks. It was too close to the coast to be used as a squadron base, but squadrons were detached there on a day-to-day basis. Lympne was also to have been the landing place for a German aircraft used in a plot to kidnap Adolf Hitler, with preparations made by the Royal Air Force for his arrival.

Lympne returned to civilian use on 1 January 1946. In 1948, the first air ferry service was inaugurated at Lympne by Silver City Airways. Problems with waterlogging of the grass runway and the refusal of the Ministry of Transport and Civil Aviation to upgrade the airfield led to Silver City transferring operations to Lydd (Ferryfield) in 1954. By 1956, the airport's ownership had passed to Eric Rylands Ltd, the Skyways holding company. Skyways operated a coach-air service between London and Paris, flying passengers from Lympne to Beauvais. This service operated until 1974 (1955–1958: the original Skyways; 1958–1971: Skyways Coach-Air; 1971–1972: Skyways International; 1972–1974: Dan-Air Skyways). Following the cessation of commercial operations in October 1974, Lympne continued to be used as a General Aviation airfield until about 1984. The site is now an industrial estate.

== History ==
=== Establishment ===
Work began on creating a landing ground at Folks Wood, Lympne, in the autumn of 1915. This site soon proved unsuitable and another site was sought. Lympne was established in March 1916 as an Emergency Landing Ground for the Royal Flying Corps (RFC) home defence fighters defending London against Zeppelins and Gothas. No. 1 Advanced School of Air Gunnery operated from Lympne during January and February 1917. In January 1917 it was designated as No. 8 Aircraft Acceptance Park for delivery of aircraft to, and reception from, France. On 25 May 1917 Lympne was bombed by Gotha G.IV bombers of Kagohl 3 who dropped 19 bombs on the airfield.

In 1918, Lympne was designated a First Class Landing Ground and the Day and Night Bombing Observation School was formed here in May. The RFC and the Royal Naval Air Service (RNAS) were merged to form the Royal Air Force (RAF) in April 1918. From 17 July 1919, No. 120 Squadron RAF flew air mail services between Lympne and Cologne, Germany, using de Havilland DH.9 aircraft fitted with Beardmore Halford Pullinger engines. This service ended on 1 September 1919 when 120 squadron moved to RAF Hawkinge. Hawkinge and Lympne lay within a few miles of each other and as the Air Ministry could not justify keeping the two bases open following the end of the war, they decided to retain Hawkinge. In August 1919 the RAF moved out of Lympne and it was turned over to civilian use, although 120 Squadron did not depart until 21 October.

=== Civil operations ===
==== 1919–1929 ====
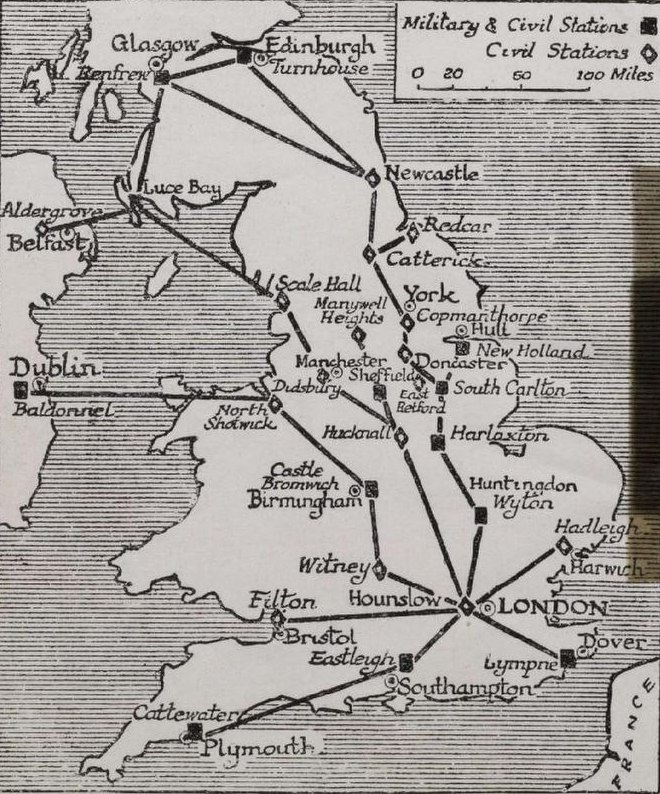
"Map of Air Routes and Landing Places in Great Britain, as temporarily arranged by the Air Ministry for civilian flying", published in 1919, showing Lympne as a "military and civil station", with a connection to Hounslow, near London.

In May 1919, Lympne was one of the first four customs and excise "Appointed Aerodromes" in the United Kingdom; along with Hadleigh in Suffolk, Hounslow Heath in Middlesex and New Holland in Lincolnshire. Although Lympne had a customs clearance point there was no permanent customs officer there; a telephone call to Folkestone Harbour was needed to clear customs. On 1 May the ban on civilian flying was lifted and a Sopwith Gnu was flown from Hounslow Heath to Lympne carrying a cargo of newspapers during that first day. In September, Sir Philip Sassoon purchased an Avro aircraft in which he commuted between London and his Lympne residence. In October the Air Ministry announced that searchlights would temporarily be displayed to assist aircraft to find certain airfields. Lympne was to be identified by three searchlights arranged in a triangle, their beams shining vertically. In November a Notice to Airmen was issued advising that radio telephony was in use at Hounslow Heath and Lympne, using the 900-metre wavelength. The practice of using the aircraft registration as a callsign was instigated. In December 1919 two Westland Limousine aircraft bound for the Paris Aero Show were delayed at Lympne by fog. Conditions later improved so that both aircraft were able to fly to Le Bourget, where G-EAJL was dismantled and transported to the Grand Palais where it was exhibited to the public. The other aircraft remained at Le Bourget where it gave pleasure and demonstration flights.

The North Sea Aerial and General Transport Co. used a Blackburn Kangaroo on its short-lived Leeds-Lympne-Amsterdam service from 6 March 1920. The customs facilities at New Holland had been withdrawn on 28 January, necessitating the roundabout route. It was estimated that the extra costs involved in taking this route amounted to one-third of the total costs. Flight called for customs facilities to be established to enable direct flights to be made from the north of England to the continent. Starting from 2 August, hourly weather forecasts were broadcast from Lympne and other airfields. A system of ground signals advising pilots of the weather conditions at Biggin Hill and Croydon was also introduced about this time. During August, Aircraft Transport and Travel took over air mail flights, using DH.9A aircraft. In November a Notice to Airmen was released announcing that searchlights would be in use at Lympne for two hours after sunset to assist pilots in landing their aircraft. Arrangements could be made in advance for this facility to be made available after the notified hours. In December, it was announced that an "aerial lighthouse" was to be installed at Lympne as the one installed at Croydon had proved to be of benefit to pilots arriving after dark.

In May 1921, it was reported that a waiting room for the use of passengers at Lympne was being planned. In June a Notice to Airmen was released saying that, for cost reasons, lights would no longer be exhibited after sunset without prior arrangement. The system of ground signals was amended with effect from 14 July, and in September an "aerial lighthouse" was reported to be under construction. The system of aerial lighthouses on the "London – Paris Airway" was completed in December 1921.

In January 1922, a 78-foot (24 m) high mast for an anemometer was being erected at the south west corner of Lympne Aerodrome. On 13 February, the system of ground signals at Lympne was further extended to include information about the Saint-Inglevert Airfield, just across the English Channel in France. In July, a Notice to Airmen said that all aircraft were to make at least one left-hand circuit before landing at Lympne. By November, the Instone Air Line were operating a service from Croydon to Cologne using de Havilland DH.18 aircraft, stopping at Lympne to refuel to full capacity. These aircraft then had the necessary range to fly direct from Lympne to Cologne. This arrangement did not last long, with the refuelling stop moved to Tirlemont, Belgium, by the end of the month. On 30 December a Dornier aircraft landed at Lympne. It was the first German aircraft to land on British soil since the end of the First World War. A German airline, Aero-Lloyd was in negotiation with Daimler Airway to start a service between London and Berlin.

A Junkers F.13 called at Lympne on 10 January 1923 to clear customs and then flew to Croydon where it was inspected by Secretary of State for Air Sir Samuel Hoare. In February, it was reported that Lympne had taken part in a test of the newly introduced Mayday radio signal used by aircraft to indicate that they were in distress. Georges Barbot won a prize of F.25,000 from Le Matin when he made a flight from St Inglevert to Lympne and back again on the same day, 6 May. He flew the route in a Dewoitine aircraft fitted with a Clerget engine. On landing a bracing wire in the undercarriage of the aircraft broke, but repairs were effected within half an hour. Problems starting the engine then delayed his departure slightly. The first cargo flight using a de Havilland DH-9 of the Belgian airline Sabena left Brussels on 23 May 1923 and stopping at Ostend to Lympne. On 28 October the Light Aircraft Trials were held (see below). In 1923, Air Union started a service flying newspapers to Lympne using a Farman F.60 Goliath.

From 1 to 31 May 1924, the Royal Air Force conducted a number of night flying experiments. Pilots were asked to keep an extra lookout whilst the experiments were taking place. On 27 and 28 September, the elimination trials for the Light Aircraft Trials were held. Only eight aircraft passed through to the trials proper. Also in October, it was notified that changes were being made expanding weather information given at Lympne. Amongst the changes were that measurements used were to be changed from imperial to metric. The addition of weather information at Brussels and Ostend, both in Belgium was notified. In 1924, Armstrong Whitworth Argosy aircraft were operating cross-channel services for Imperial Airways. Lympne was used by aircraft of Imperial Airways as a refuelling point. The first stop in France was St Inglevert. When an aircraft departed Lympne for St Inglevert, the destination airfield was advised, and if arrival was not notified within two hours, the Coastguard was informed. Communication was by Carmichael Microway UHF transmitters at each airfield. Short Brothers used Lympne for flight testing new aircraft during 1924.

In January 1925, notification that red edge lights had been installed along the runways and taxiways at Lympne was made. In July 1925, a new arrangement was introduced whereby aircraft not fitted with radio, flying across the Channel, could have their departure and arrival reported by radio to the authorities. A circuit of Lympne and St Inglevert had to be flown at a height not exceeding 1,000 ft (300 m) on departure for, and arrival from, the continent. Between 1–3 August, the Royal Aeronautical Society held a meeting at Lympne. The Grosvenor Challenge Cup, Private Owners' Cup, Light Aeroplane Holiday Handicap and International Handicap were all competed for. Separate Speed Races were held for single and two-seater aircraft. In August 1925, the scheme for non-radio aircraft was extended to cover Ostend. One hour was allowed for the crossing to St Inglevert and two hours for the crossing to Ostend, after which the aircraft would be reported as missing. On 25 September, Lympne was one of a number of airfields which began operating a radio direction finding service. As before the 900-metre wavelength was used.

During the General Strike of 1926, which ran from 3–13 May, the Daily Mail was printed in Paris and flown from there to Lympne on Handley Page W.10 Imperial Airways aircraft. Further aircraft chartered by the Daily Mail then flew the newspapers to Birmingham for onward distribution. A fleet of de Havilland DH.60 Moth, de Havilland DH.9 with some Avro and Westland aircraft were used. The distribution of the newspapers by air was co-ordinated by the Royal Aero Club and a total of 33,174 mi (53,388 km) was flown by aircraft operating under the Royal Aero Club's co-ordination. The Royal Auxiliary Air Force (AuxAF) had been formed in 1925. In late August and early September 1926 601 (County of London) Squadron AuxAF held its inaugural camp at Lympne. The squadron was equipped with Avro 504 and de Havilland DH.9A aircraft. The Light Aircraft Trials were held between 10 and 14 September.

On 1 January 1927, new regulations came into effect which meant that aircraft carrying 10 or more passengers would have to carry a radio operator in addition to the pilot. In February it was reported that a Notice to Airmen had been issued stating that aircraft coming from the Continent in conditions of poor visibility in which the radio was not functioning correctly should land at Lympne, where repair facilities were available. In April it was reported that a new wireless station was being built at Lympne and in May it was notified that the night light was again in operation at Lympne. In July, a new system was introduced for civil aircraft flying in bad visibility between Lympne and Croydon. They were not to follow the normal Lympne–Edenbridge–Caterham–Croydon route, but instead follow one of three notified alternate routes. Aircraft were to be notified by radio whenever such conditions were declared to be put into effect, or whenever the weather had improved. This was aimed at preventing mid-air collisions between civil aircraft and those operated by the Royal Air Force. From 7 to 21 August, 600 (City of London) Squadron AuxAF and 601 (County of London) Squadron AuxAF were both at Lympne on their annual camp. The squadrons were flying Avro 504N and de Havilland DH.9A aircraft. In October, a Notice to Airmen announced that the ground signals at Lympne would be displayed in a different arrangement than previously, standardisation of ground signals worldwide required the change which came into effect on 1 October. In December, a Notice to Airmen informed that in foggy weather the position of Lympne would be indicated by flares fired from the ground, to be seen by aircraft flying in the vicinity. Colour was to be at the discretion of the Civil Air Traffic Officer. The Notice to Airmen was quickly amended to state that the firing of red flares would be reserved to indicate that an aircraft was being instructed not to land at the airfield in question. In 1927 a Fokker F.VII of Sabena flew newspapers to Lympne.

A meeting was held over the Easter weekend in 1928 by the Cinque Ports Flying Club. Pleasure flights were given for a cost of 5/-. An unverified report stated that one person was dissatisfied with two circuits of the airfield. The pilot is said to have offered to take him up again, which was accepted. On this second flight various aerobatics were flown and the hapless passenger was said to have been left incapable of expressing himself coherently. Among the pilots attending were Geoffrey de Havilland and his son. Other activities included some air racing and a guess the altitude competition. In May a Notice to Airmen said that the scheme for aircraft reporting that they were crossing the Channel was being extended. Lympne was to remain the reporting place on the English side but, in Belgium and France, the Ostend and St Inglevert airfields were joined by semaphore stations at Village de Baracques, Calais and Cap d’Alprech, Boulogne. On 17 May, Lady Heath landed at Lympne after crossing the Channel during her 10,000 mi (16,000 km) flight to Croydon from Cape Town, South Africa. She was flying an Avro Avian III which had been taken out to South Africa by ship. In August, the AuxAF held their annual Air Defence Exercises. Both 600 (City of London) and 601 (County of London) Squadrons AuxAF were based a Lympne for the duration of the exercise. They were operating Avro 504N and de Havilland DH.9A aircraft. Towards the end of the camp Chancellor of the Exchequer Winston Churchill and Under Secretary of State for Air Sir Philip Sassoon inspected both squadrons and were entertained at a dinner. On 18 September, Juan de la Cierva departed from Lympne in an Autogyro, making the first flight between London and Paris in this type of aircraft and the first flight across the Channel by autogyro in the process. In November, a Handley Page W.10 of Imperial Airways diverted to Lympne in a gale with three passengers suffering from airsickness. Once landed the aircraft was briefly lifted from the ground in a gust whilst ground handling staff were taking it to a hangar. Winds of 82 mph (132 km/h) were recorded.

In January 1929, a Notice to Airmen said that when visibility was bad any aircraft not fitted with radios were warned against using the Croydon–Edenbridge–Ashford–Lympne route or any of the alternative routes notified in 1927. Later that month it was notified that the aerial lighthouse had been replaced by a 6,000 candlepower neon light which would be visible at a range of 45 mi (72 km). In July 1929 a plan was proposed where an amphibious aircraft would be based at Lympne for use in search and rescue when aircraft were reported missing over the Channel. On 14 August, the 601 (County of London) Squadron AuxAF arrived for their annual camp. In September 1929 arrangements were notified for the abandonment of a Channel crossing by aircraft flying from England to France. In such cases, the aircraft was to perform a second circuit over Lympne which would be acknowledged. It was also notified that a flying boat operated by Compagnie Aérienne Française was to be based at Calais for use in search and rescue work.

==== 1930–1939 ====
In February 1930, a Towle TA-2 amphibian was a visitor to Lympne. In July 1930, it was notified that aircraft fitted with radio may report their position by radio when crossing the Channel. For non-radio aircraft the earlier arrangements remained in effect, although some changes were made to the methods of acknowledgement of arrival. Search and rescue arrangements now included motorboats permanently available at Boulogne, Calais, Dover and Dunkirk. Lifeboats were also on standby at the French ports and air patrols were in operation during working hours, operated by Air Union. In August 1930, the arrangements for non-radio aircraft flying between Croydon and Lympne in bad weather were amended. Pilots had to notify which route they intended to take and the destination airfield was to be notified of this by telephone once the aircraft had departed. That month 601 (County of London) Squadron held its annual camp a Lympne.

On 1 August 1931, the 601 (County of London) Squadron AuxAF began its annual camp at Lympne. Croydon Airport took over the responsibility for weather forecasting on air routes from the Air Ministry in October. As part of the changes Biggin Hill, Croydon and Lympne now provided weather information on a 24-hour basis.

In March 1932, the arrangements for flying between Lympne and Croydon in poor visibility were altered. If the cloudbase was less than 1,000 ft (300 m) above sea level, or the visibility was less than 1,000 yd (910 m), aircraft were prohibited from using the Croydon–Caterham–Penshurst–Lympne route, but were to use either the Croydon–Merstham–Edenbridge or Croydon–Chelsfield–Shoreham–Otford–Wrotham route. Alternatively a rhumb line course could be flown on the Croydon–Chelsfield–Lympne route. Aircraft not fitted with radios had to notify the officer in charge at their departure airport as to which route they intended to take before departure. Royal Air Force aircraft would avoid these routes as far as practicable in conditions of poor visibility. On 25 August the Folkestone Trophy Race was held at Lympne and was won by a Comper Swift. In November, it was reported that new radio equipment was to be installed at Lympne and St Inglevert operating on the 15-cm waveband at 2,000 Megahertz. The new radios were to be used for the announcement of the departure of non-radio aircraft across the Channel. Messages sent by radio were also printed out by a teleprinter, providing a record of the communication. The new equipment was scheduled to come into operation in Spring 1933.

In 1933, Imperial Airway's Armstrong Whitworth Argosy aircraft were replaced by Handley Page H.P.42s. On 7 March 1933, the system for non-radio aircraft proved effective when a de Havilland DH.60 Moth of British Air Transport failed to arrive at Lympne. The aircraft had ditched in the channel and both occupants were rescued by a steamship bound for Amsterdam, Netherlands. In August, the No. 601 (County of London) Squadron again held its annual camp at Lympne. They were visited by the Marquess of Londonderry who was the Secretary of State for Air. The squadron was equipped with Hawker Harts. Later that month the Folkestone Aero Trophy Race was held and was won by Ken Waller in a de Havilland DH.60 Moth. In September, a new system was introduced for broadcasting weather forecasts in various areas and on various air routes, including that between Croydon and Lympne. Navigational warnings would also be broadcast. In October, it was notified that the floodlight at Lympne had been put back into operation and the use of flares was therefore discontinued. In November, a squadron of the Egyptian Army Air Force was based at Lympne for a few weeks whilst they trained on their new Avro 626 aircraft. They departed on 18 November for Egypt. By 1933, Lympne was well prepared for handling diversions. Passengers who cleared customs were taken by car to Folkestone Central railway station where they boarded trains to London using 1st class tickets. On 2 December, a Fokker F.XX, PH-AIZ Zilvermeeuw of KLM, diverted to Lympne following an engine failure. This was the only diversion KLM had during the whole of 1933.

In January 1934, a new radio, telegraph and telephone link was installed at Lympne and St Inglevert which came into operation on 26 January. Sir Philip Sassoon officially declared the installation open. The equipment at Lympne was manufactured by Standard Telephones and Cables and operated on the 17-cm wave band. From 13 to 27 July, 606 (City of Glasgow) Squadron AuxAF held its annual camp at Lympne, followed by 601 (County of London) Squadron AuxAF from 29 July to 12 August. On the weekend of 1–2 September competitions for the Folkestone Aero Trophy and the Wakefield Cup were held. Both competitions were won by pilots flying the de Havilland DH.60 Moth G-AAMU. Later that month a second batch of ten Avro 626s of the Egyptian Army Air Force departed from Lympne for Egypt.

In April 1935, Air Traffic Control in the United Kingdom was improved by the introduction of a new control zone system. Heston was added as a control zone, relieving Croydon of some traffic. As a result of these changes the wavelength used by Lympne for radiotelegraphy changed from 862 metres to 825 metres. Six new direction finding stations were installed as part of these improvements, including one at Lympne. The improvement meant that Croydon would now be able to communicate by radio with two aircraft at the same time. In August Henri Mignet flew his Mignet HM.14 "Flying Flea" across the Channel to Lympne, where the aircraft was demonstrated in front of large crowds. Also that month 601 (County of London) Squadron AuxAF held its annual camp at Lympne after having converted from a bomber squadron to a fighter squadron earlier in the year.

From 2 to 16 August 1936, No. 601 Squadron held their annual camp at Lympne. One aircraft exhibited at the 1936 International Air Rally was a 1912 Caudron G.2. In November, it was reported that 21 Squadron and 34 Squadron of the RAF were temporarily relocated to Lympne as hangars at RAF Abbotsinch had been damaged in gales. In October 1936, Lympne was again taken over by the RAF, becoming a base within No. 1 (Bomber) Group. Although some improvements were carried out Lympne was initially seen as a temporary station. On 3 November 21 Squadron and 34 Squadron moved in, equipped with Hawker Hind aircraft.

On 4 June 1937, a B.A. (Klemm) Swallow made a pilot-less take-off from Lympne and flew for some 35 minutes before crashing into a tree, 200 yd (180 m) from RAF Hawkinge. The aircraft was repaired, but subsequently destroyed on the ground at Lympne in 1940 during a German bombing raid in the Battle of Britain. On 31 July the Folkestone Trophy was competition was held and was won by Alex Henshaw in a Percival Mew Gull.

On 12 March 1938, Captain Davis, managing director of the Cinque Ports Flying Club, was killed in an accident shortly after take-off from Lympne. On 30 July, the Folkestone Trophy race was held and was won by H Buckingham flying a de Havilland Hornet Moth. 34 Squadron departed Lympne on 12 July, and 21 Squadron departed on 15 August. Lympne was placed under "Care and Maintenance" in October, becoming a Training Command Administration School.

In May 1939, Lympne was transferred to Fighter Command. It was used by the Fleet Air Arm as an outstation for the Air Mechanics School based at HMS Daedalus. On 1 July 1939, Lympne was taken over by the Fleet Air Arm, becoming HMS Buzzard. Aircraft at Buzzard included Blackburn Sharks and Gloster Gladiators. On 5 August, the Folkestone Trophy Race was held and was won by Andrew Dalrymple flying a Chilton D.W.1A.

=== The Second World War ===
In September 1939, the base was renamed HMS Daedalus II, but was transferred back to the RAF in May 1940. Early in the war Lympne was home to Army Co-operation and bomber squadrons. During Operation Dynamo in May 1940 a French Air Force squadron was based at Lympne. It was equipped with Marcel Bloch and Potez fighters. On 15 August 1940, during the Battle of Britain, Lympne was bombed by Stuka dive-bombers of II Gruppe, StG1. All the hangars were hit and those aircraft belonging to Cinque Ports Flying Club that had not been evacuated to Sywell were destroyed in the fire. Lympne was evacuated and only available as an Emergency Landing Ground until mid-September.

In 1941, Lympne was to be the destination for the landing of an aircraft carrying Adolf Hitler in a daring kidnap plot. A man by the name of Kiroff had given information to the British Military Attaché in Sofia, Bulgaria, that he was the brother-in-law of Hans Baur, the personal pilot of Hitler. He stated that Baur was planning to defect using Hitler's Focke-Wulf Fw 200 with him on board. The RAF made plans to receive the aircraft at Lympne and 25 March was the date that the defection was expected to occur. Baur did not defect and spent the war as Hitler's personal pilot. A few weeks later Rudolf Hess defected to Scotland.

Also in March 1941, 91 Squadron moved in, equipped with Spitfires. Additional dispersals and fighter pens as well as three new blister hangars were built during 1941. Typhoons were based at Lympne from March 1942 to February 1944 to counter the threat posed by the Luftwaffe's newly introduced Focke-Wulf Fw 190s and a runway was extended across Otterpool Lane to accommodate the Typhoons. In November 1944, Lympne was downgraded to Emergency Landing Ground status. Consideration was given to building four runways at Lympne, with the longest being 6,000 ft (1,800 m), but it was noted that serious demolition work would be required and a number of roads would need to be closed.

=== Return to civil use ===
==== 1946–1950 ====
On 1 January 1946, RAF Lympne was handed over to the Ministry of Civil Aviation and became a civil airport once more. The Cinque Ports Flying Club re-established itself in facilities left by the RAF and re-opened on 12 July. The club possessed two Tiger Moths and an Auster. The first post-war air races were the Folkestone Trophy and the Lympne High Speed Handicap held over the weekend of 31 August and 1 September. The Folkestone Trophy was won by John Grierson flying a Supermarine Walrus (G-AHFN). The Lympne High Speed Handicap was won by W Humble flying a Hawker Fury I. Charter airline Air Kruise (Kent) Ltd was established at Lympne by Wing Commander Hugh Kennard and in September it was reported that the company had received the first civilian Miles Messenger aircraft. Air Kruise also operated Dragon Rapides.

On 1 December 1946, Group Captain A. Bandit departed Lympne in a Miles Gemini bound for Wondai, Australia. This was the first solo flight to Australia since the end of the war. Bandit reached Truscott Airfield, Western Australia, on 6 January 1947 to complete the first post-war England–Australia flight. Air races were held at Lympne on 30 and 31 August and four national records were set (see below).

In July 1948, Silver City Airways started an aerial car ferry service from Lympne to Le Touquet using Bristol Freighter aircraft. At the Lympne Aero Races Lettice Curtis set a new women's world speed record whilst competing in the High Speed Handicap race flying a Spitfire XI. The Cinque Ports Flying Club folded on 1 October, its successor being the Kent Coast Flying Club which was set up by Hugh Kennard and had a Miles Magister (G-AKJX). Kent Gliding Club took up residence, and Skyfotos also made Lympne its base for aerial photography. Aircraft operated by Skyfotos included an Auster Autocrat (G-AIZZ) and a Piper PA-22 Caribbean (G-AREN).

In May 1949, it was reported that Lympne had made a loss of £17,000 and that the Air Ministry was looking to dispose of it, although it was thought that should a sale not materialise it would continue in operation. In August 1950, Air Kruise started a scheduled service between Lympne and Le Touquet using Dragon Rapides. This service was operated under an associate airline agreement with British European Airways.

==== 1951–1960 ====
In December 1951, Lympne was closed to all aircraft exceeding 8,000 lb (3,600 kg) due to the runway being waterlogged and Silver City Airways transferred their service to Southend Airport until Lympne reopened in February 1952. Blackbushe Airport was also used whilst Lympne was closed. On 1 May 1952, a passenger tax was introduced in the United Kingdom. The rate was 5s for passengers arriving from Europe and 7s 6d for those arriving from outside Europe. At the same time landing fees at Government-owned airports were halved where the aircraft was operating an international flight of less than 115 mi (185 km). Silver City Airways would benefit from this concession. Also in May it was reported that Air Kruise were extending the Lympne – Le Touquet service to Ramsgate, as Ramsgate Airport was to be re-opened. In July, the members of Folkestone Town Council visited the Ministry of Civil Aviation in London to discuss the purchase of Lympne Airport.

In February 1953, Lympne was again waterlogged and Silver City Airways operated out of Southend and Blackbushe. The company stated that they were willing to purchase Lympne, but the decision of Folkestone Town Council was still awaited for. By May, Folkestone Town Council had decided not to purchase Lympne and Silver City Airways again expressed an interest in purchasing the airport at a reasonable price. In November, it was announced that Air Kruise had been given permission to operate a scheduled service from Lympne and/or Ramsgate to Birmingham. The service was to be seasonal between April and September, with permission to run the service lasting until 1960. Air Kruise moved its operations to Ramsgate Airport in 1953.

In March 1954, Air Kruise applied for permission to operate Dakotas on routes between Lympne and Le Touquet, Calais and Ostend. On 29 April, the Ministry of Transport and Civil Aviation offered Lympne for sale by auction in London. Bidding reached £88,000 but the reserve was £100,000 and the airport was not sold. On 28 August, Silver City Airways trialled a Westland-Sikorsky WS-51 helicopter on cross-Channel flights. Permission had been granted for the use of these aircraft for freight operations and it was intended to introduce them on 1 April 1955. On 3 October, Silver City Airways operated their last flight out of Lympne as operations were being transferred to the new Lydd (Ferryfield) Airport which had opened on 6 July 1954. A total of 33,487 car ferry flights had been made from Lympne since the service had started in 1948. As of 1 November, Lympne closed as a public airport, although private flying was allowed as long as no passengers were carried for hire or reward.

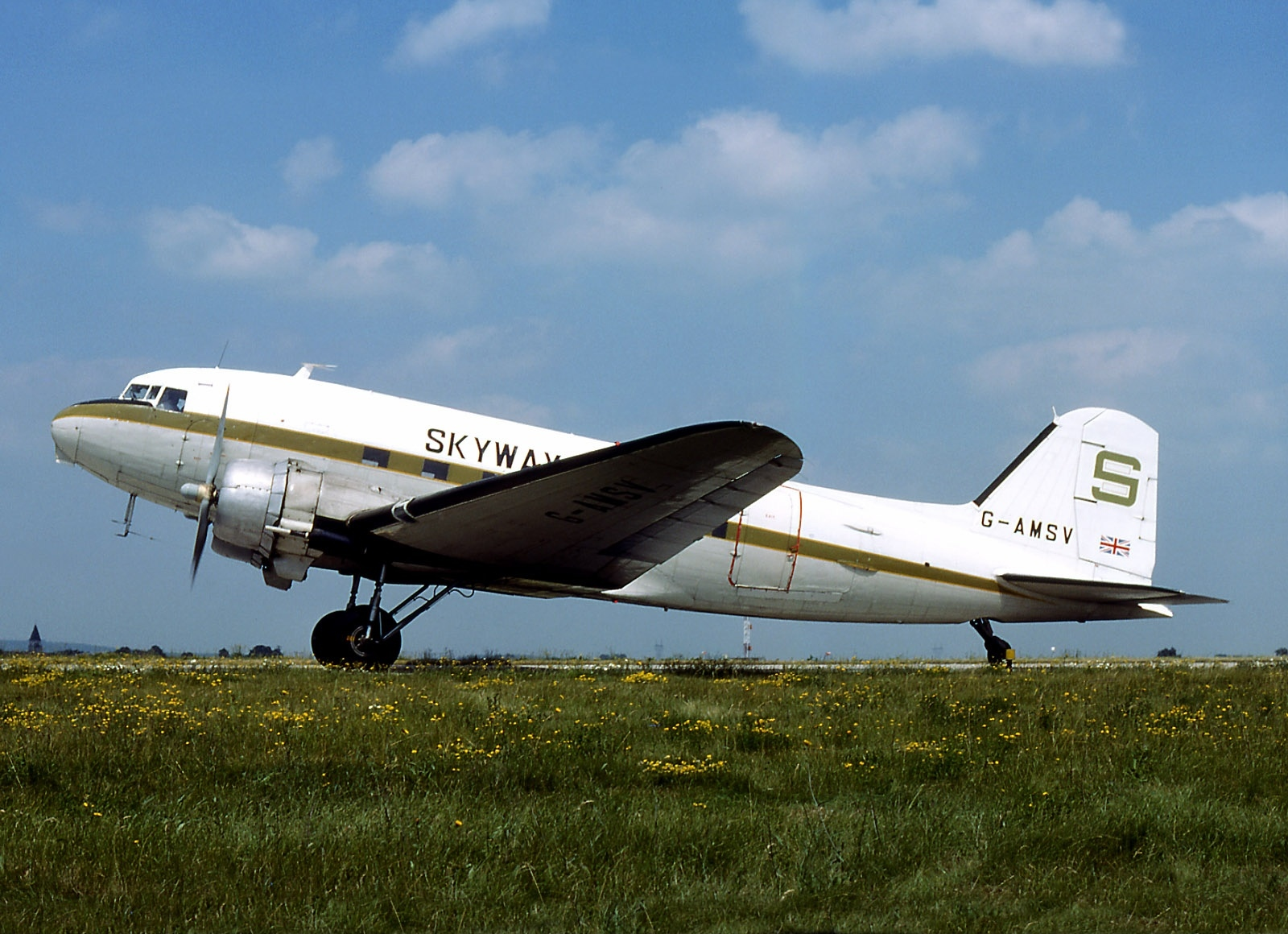
Skyways Douglas C-47B Dakota (DC-3)

In 1955, Air Kruise moved to Lydd (Ferryfield) and Lympne was re-licensed in 1955. On 30 September 1955, Eric Rylands, a former co-owner and managing director of the Lancashire Aircraft Corporation (LAC) who had bought Skyways from the previous owners in March 1952 (together with LAC's other owner, David Brown), started a coach-air service between London and Paris. Passengers were taken by coach from Victoria Coach Station to Lympne, flown to Beauvais and then taken by coach to Paris. Check-in and coach departures in Paris were at the Hôtel Moderne Palace on Place de la Republique in Paris 12. Aircraft and coaches each held 36 passengers. Passengers returning to the UK could order duty-free goods at Paris and the orders were telephoned to Beauvais for distribution on the flight. The off-peak fare was £7 14s 0d and 47,000 passengers were carried in the first year. Three Dakotas were used initially and later increasing to four. A trial run took place on 21 September and Skyways holding company, Eric Rylands Ltd, bought Lympne from the Ministry of Transport and Civil Aviation in 1956.

In January 1957, Skyways ordered a new Decca type 424 radar for installation at Lympne. In summer 1957, a service was started between Lympne and Vichy, the first service between the UK and Vichy since Hillman's Airways before the war. This was part of Skyways London–Lympne–Lyons–Nice route. Valence was also served by air.

In May 1958, a route to Nice via Lyon was introduced. A temporary service to Brussels via Antwerp operated that year to serve the Brussels International Exhibition. In December, it was announced that an experimental scheme to allow British and Irish subjects to make day-trips abroad without needing a passport was to be introduced on a limited number of routes, including Lympne–Beauvais. An identity card would be issued in lieu of a passport and the experiment was to run from Easter to the end of September 1959.

On 15 March 1959, RAF Detling closed and the land was sold back to its pre-war tenants, who did not wish for any flying to take place. As a consequence the Kent Gliding Club relocated temporarily to Lympne. In June, Skyways signed a letter of intent to purchase a number of Avro 748 aircraft. Flight magazine stated that the number involved was "about four". Skyways were the first airline to make a public announcement of support for the then yet-to-fly airliner. In autumn 1960, Lympne was closed for a few days due to waterlogging of the runway.

==== 1961–1970 ====
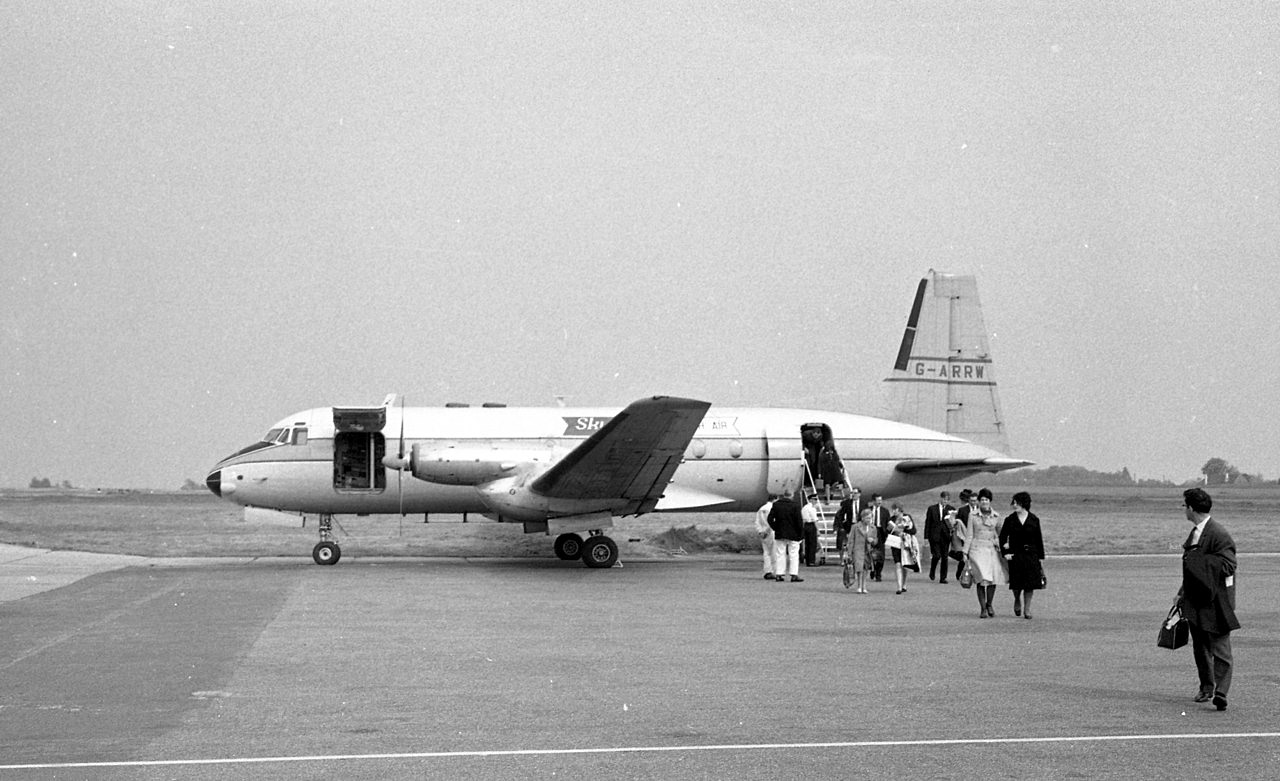
Skyways Coach Air HS.748 at Lympne airport, 1968

On 3 May 1961, Skyways signed a contract for the purchase of three Avro 748s at a cost of £750,000. On 6 November, the process of final certification of the Avro 748 began. A programme of 160 hours of flying, simulating airline service, took place over the following 19 days and included a break for maintenance on 16 November. The programme also allowed Skyways pilots to gain further experience towards the 50 hours in command they needed before they could fly the aircraft in service. The aircraft was returned to Avro at the end of the trials as it was not scheduled to be delivered to Skyways until 1 March 1962.

On 15 March 1962, a bomb disposal officer was killed at Lympne when the pipe mine he was attempting to make safe exploded. The Army temporarily suspended their bomb disposal operations as a result. Skyways supplemented their Dakotas with an Avro 748 (G-ARMV) which operated its first revenue-earning flight on 17 April 1962. In July, it was reported that Skyways had extended the passenger terminal at Lympne. In November, Skyways was taken over by Euravia, excluding Skyways Coach-Air which remained a separate company.

In 1963, three Avro 748s were in service and two of Skyways Coach-Air's Dakotas were converted to freighters. During the winter of 1962–63, the 748s continued to operate a normal service out of Lympne. In October 1964, Skyways Coach-Air moved out of its London offices and all operations were now at Lympne, although a sales office was retained in London. The Cinque Ports Flying Club was restarted in 1964 by Barry Damon and had 120 members by 1968. The club aircraft were a Beechcraft Bonanza, Beechcraft Musketeers and a Bölkow Monsun.

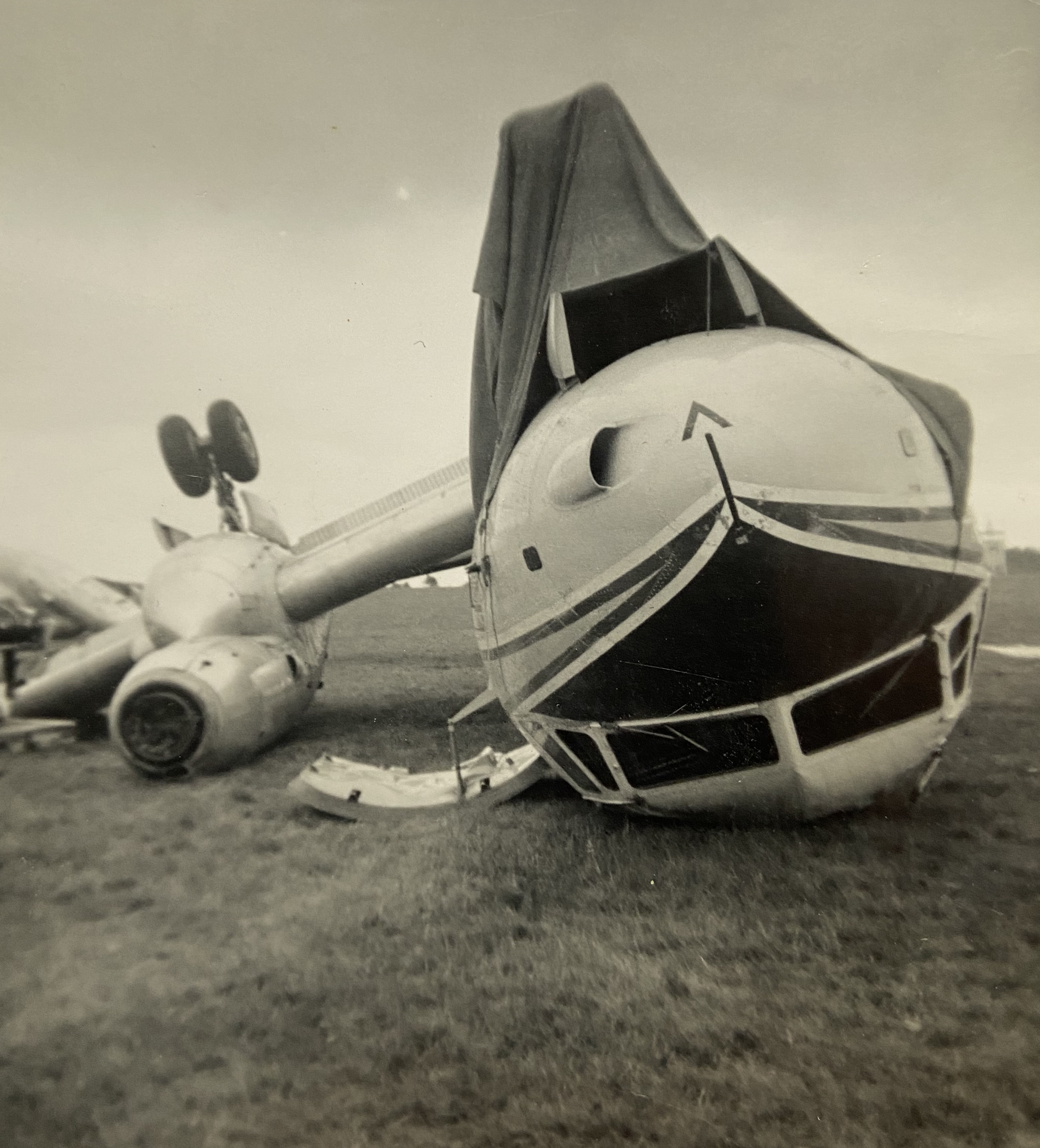
The wreck of Skyways' Avro 748 G-ARMV after its crash at Lympne in July 1965.

In March 1965, a NOTAM was issued of changes had been made into the arrangements for light aircraft crossing the Channel. These changes were partly to avoid conflict with traffic flying into Lydd (Ferryfield). Non-radio aircraft could use the route between Hythe and Ambleteuse. Non-radio aircraft were advised to call at Lympne before crossing. On 11 July, one of Skyways Coach Air's Avro 748s crashed on landing at Lympne.

Following the 1965 accident, which had been caused by the nose-wheel of the aircraft digging into soft ground, a 4,500 ft (1,372 m) concrete runway was constructed. It was reported in January 1968 that planning permission had been granted and the new runway came into use on 11 April 1968. Skyways Coach-Air leased an Avro 748 from Leeward Islands Air Transport in 1968 for a two-year period to replace the aircraft lost in the 1965 accident.

A new terminal building opened in June 1969. Sheila Scott performed the ceremony, arriving in her record-breaking Piper Comanche G-ATOY Myth Too. On 10 June, the airport was renamed Ashford Airport, identifying the airport with the nearby town of Ashford which was scheduled for rapid growth. To mark the occasion a plaque was unveiled by Leader of the Opposition Edward Heath.

==== 1971–1984 ====
A financial crisis at Skyways Coach-Air in 1970 resulted in a management buy-out in 1971. Under the name Skyways International, services were operated from Lympne to Beauvais, Clermont-Ferrand and Montpellier. In 1971, to celebrate the management buyout of Skyways Coach-Air and subsequent renaming as Skyways International, an air rally was held at Lympne. Ray Hanna attended in a Spitfire. Skyways International was bought by Dan-Air in February 1972, with operations continuing under the [interim] Dan-Air Skyways name.

In October 1974, commercial activities ceased at Lympne and Business Air Travel, Dan-Air and Skyfotos left. In 1982, the airfield was in use by the Ashford Parachute Centre with a Super Cub in residence in July 1983. The Eagle Parachute School also used Lympne before it changed to Ashford Parachute Centre and closed in 1984. In 1983, Luscombe Aircraft was based at Lympne producing their Luscombe Rattler, a military version of the Luscombe Vitality. The Cinque Ports Flying Club moved to Lydd in 1984.

== Light Aircraft Trials ==
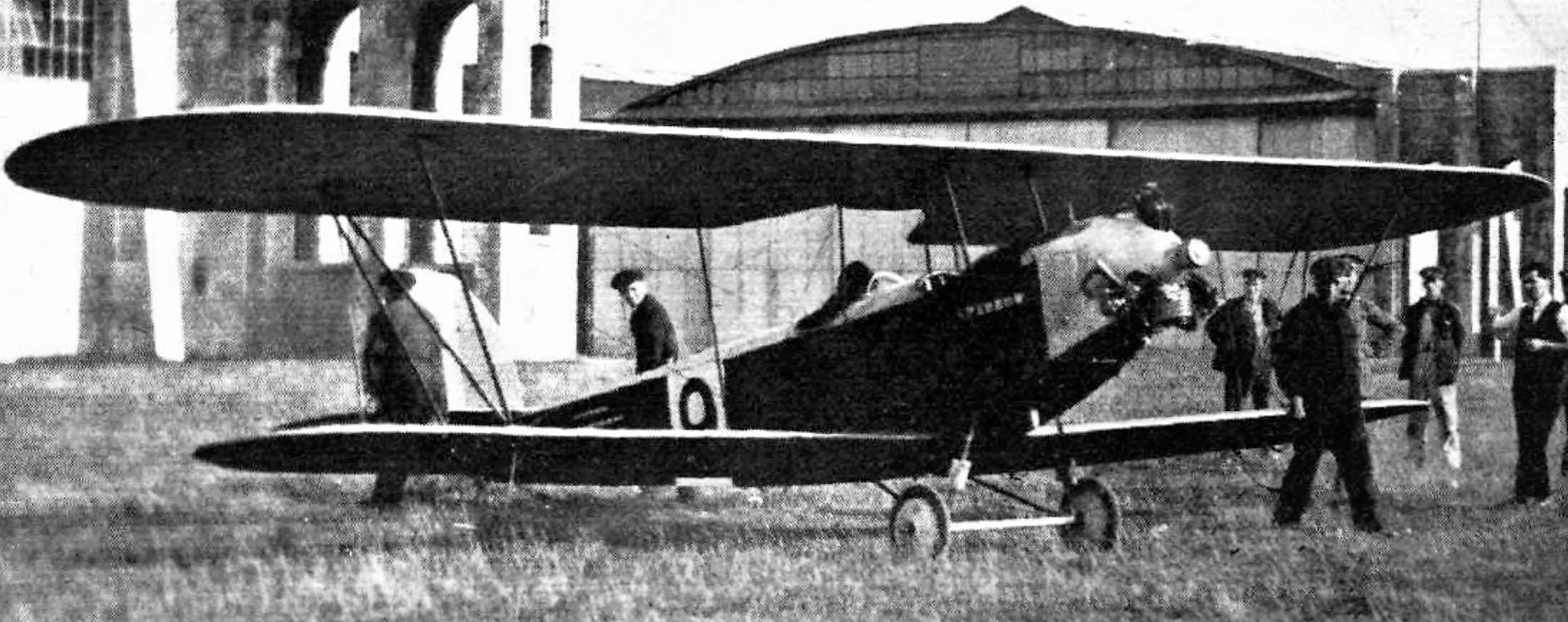
Supermarine Sparrow I G-EBJP during the 1924 Light Aircraft Trials at Lympne

Light Aviation Trials were held at Lympne in 1923, 1924 and 1926 sponsored by the Daily Mail. The 1923 competition was for aircraft with maximum engine capacity of 750 cc (46 cu in). This increased to 1,100 cc (67 cu in) in 1924 and was replaced by an engine weight limit of 170 lb (77 kg) in 1926. The rules for 1924 and 1926 required two-seat, dual-control aircraft. Aircraft that entered production after competing at the Light Aviation Trials include the Avro Avian, Blackburn Bluebird and Westland Widgeon, although these had larger engines. The 1924 competition was won by the Beardmore WB XXIV Wee Bee powered by a Bristol Cherub engine. The 1926 competition was won by a Hawker Cygnet.

== Air racing ==
=== Pre-war air races ===
Air racing at Lympne began in 1923. On 25 June 1923 the Grosvenor Cup was held at Lympne. There were ten entrants, of which nine competed. The cup was competed for over a course that started and finished at Lympne, the route being Lympne–Croydon–Birmingham–Bristol–Croydon–Lympne, a total distance of 404 miles (650 km). The race was won by Walter Longton, with Fred Raynham second and Bert Hinkler third. Major Foot was killed when his aircraft crashed at Chertsey, Surrey, on the Bristol–Croydon leg caused by the structural failure of the port wing. Lympne was a checkpoint during the 1928 King's Cup Race and two local newspapers, the Folkestone Herald and Kent Evening Echo offered a cup to the fastest private pilot on the leg from Southampton to Lympne. It was won by Sqn Ldr H. Probyn in a Westland Widgeon, who beat Norman Jones in a de Havilland DH.60 Moth by four seconds.

Competitors

Registration	Type	Pilot	Engine	Notes
G-EADA	Avro 504K	Harold Hamersley	100 hp (75 kW) Bristol Lucifer	Finished 4th
G-EAGP	Sopwith Gnu	Walter Longton	110 hp (82 kW) Le Rhône	Winner
G-EAUM	Avro Baby	Bert Hinkler	35 hp (26 kW) Green	Finished in 3rd place
G-EBCA	RAF SE5a	E D Whitehead Reid	80 hp (60 kW) Renault	Retired at Birmingham
	Avro 504K	H H Perry	100 hp (75 kW) Bristol Lucifer	Finished 5th
	Avro 504K	Fred Raynham	130 hp (97 kW) Clerget	Finished 2nd
	Boulton & Paul P.9	F L Robinson	90 hp (67 kW) RAF	Retired at Bristol
	Bristol Taxiplane	C F Uwins	100 hp (75 kW) Bristol Lucifer	Retired at Bristol
	Bristol Monoplane	E L Foot	100 hp (75 kW) Bristol Lucifer	Crashed at Chertsey, pilot killed

The Light Aircraft Trials included a speed section over a triangular course of Lympne-Postling-Brabourne-Lympne. The Folkestone Aero Trophy was held at Lympne in 1932 and the Wakefield Cup races in 1933. The final air race before the Second World War was the Folkestone Aero Trophy on 5 August 1939. This was won by Andrew Dalrymple in Chilton D.W.1 (G-AFSV).

Races at Lympne:-

- 1923 Grosvenor Cup, Light Aircraft Trials
- 1924 Light Aircraft Trials, Air League Challenge Cup
- 1925 Royal Aero Club Race Meeting, Light Aeroplane International Holiday Handicap, Private Owners' Race
- 1926 Light Aircraft Trials
- 1928 King's Cup Race (checkpoint), Folkestone Herald and Kent Evening Echo Cup
- 1929 King's Cup Race (checkpoint)
- 1930 King's Cup Race
- 1932 Folkestone Aero Trophy Race
- 1933 Cinque Ports Wakefield Cup Race
- 1937 Wakefield Cup Race
- 1938 Folkestone Aero Trophy Race
- 1939 Wakefield Cup Race, Folkestone Aero Trophy Race

=== Post-war air races ===
With the resumption of civil flying in 1946, a number of air races were held. The 1946 Folkestone Aero Trophy was won by John Grierson in Supermarine Walrus G-AHFN. The 1946 Siddeley Trophy was won by R Pomphret in Tiger Moth G-AHNX. The four aircraft in the 1946 High Speed Handicap were a Vampire (flown by Geoffrey de Havilland), Hornet (Geoffrey Pike), Fury (William Humble) and Seafang (Guy Morgan). The race was won by the Fury flown by Humble. John Cunningham competed in the 1947 High Speed Handicap in Vampire F1 VZ332, coming sixth. Peter Twiss flying a Firefly IV won the high-speed race at 305.93 mph (492.35 km/h). The winner received the Hythe Aero Trophy and £100. The 1948 High Speed Handicap Race was won by Flt Lt J Colquhoun in a two-seat Spitfire. The course was Capel airship hangar, Folkestone pier and Hythe gas holder. In 1950, competitors in the Daily Express South Coast Air Race used Lympne before the race started. This race was won by Nick Charlton in Proctor G-AHUZ.

Races held at Lympne:-

- 1946 Folkestone Aero Trophy, High Speed Handicap Race, Siddeley Trophy Race
- 1947 High Speed Handicap Race (Hythe Aero Trophy), Siddeley Trophy Race
- 1948 High Speed Handicap Race, Siddeley Trophy Race, Tiger Moth Scratch Race
- 1950 Daily Express South Coast Air Race

== Record breakers ==
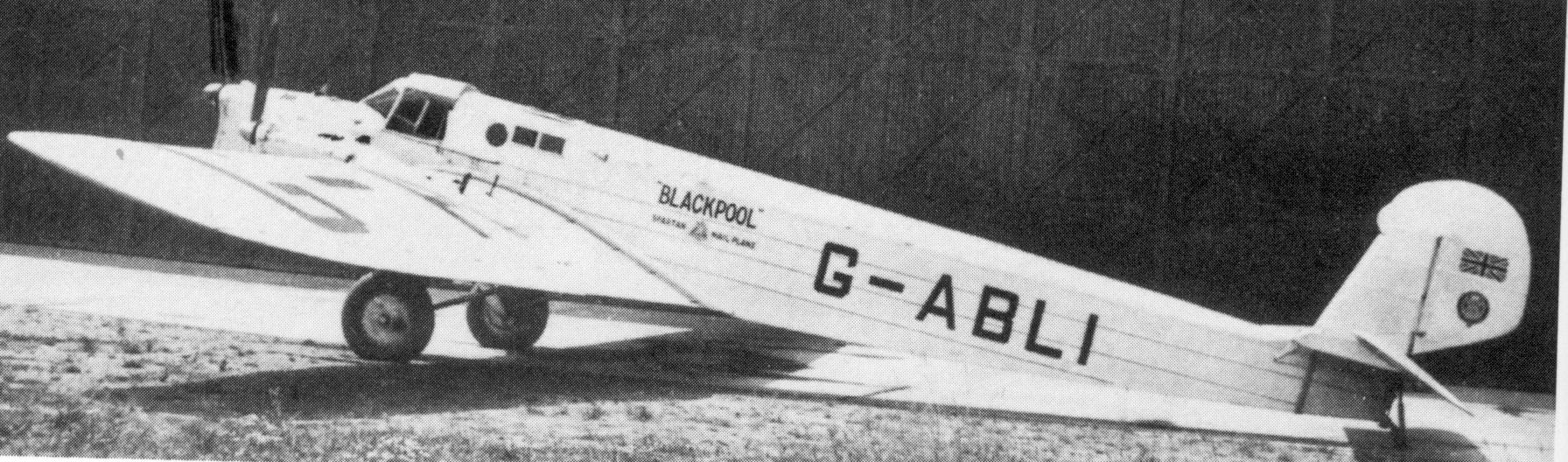
Spartan A-24 Mailplane G-ABLI

Lympne was the start and finish for several record attempts. Wing Commander E. R. Manning left for India in a Westland Widgeon in 1923, but only got as far as Baghdad. In 1930 the Fokker F VIIA (G-EBTS) The Spider flown by Charles Douglas Barnard and R F Little, with Mary Russell, Duchess of Bedford as passenger, left Lympne for Maitland Airport, Cape Town, which was reached in a record 100 hours. In 1931 C.W.A. Scott set a UK-Australia record in a DH.60 (G-ABHY). On the return he landed at Lympne in the aircraft which had been re-registered VH-UQA. Also in 1931 Glen Kitson and Owen Cathcart-Jones left Lympne bound for Cape Town in a Lockheed DL-1 Vega Special. Cape Town was reached in 6 days, 10 hours. On 31 October C. Arthur Butler flew from Lympne to Darwin in a Comper Swift (G-ABRE), beating C.W.A. Scott's record by 102 minutes.

In October 1932, a Spartan A.24 Mailplane (G-ABLI) left Lympne en route for Karachi from Blackpool. Karachi was reached in less than six days. On 14 November 1932, Amy Johnson left Lympne for Cape Town in DH.80a Puss Moth (G-ACAB). She beat her husband Jim Mollison's time by 10 hours and 28 minutes, setting a new UK-South Africa record. On the return she also set a new South Africa-UK record. On 11 April 1933, William Newton Lancaster departed Lympne in an Avro Avian V (G-ABLK) Southern Cross Minor to beat Amy Johnson's UK-South Africa record. The aircraft crashed in the Sahara next day and although Lancaster survived he died eight days later when his water ran out. On 2 November 1934, Owen Cathcart Jones and Ken Waller landed at Lympne in a de Havilland Comet (G-ACSR) after a record breaking flight from Australia to the United Kingdom. Harry Frank Broadbent landed at Lympne in a DH.85 Leopard Moth (VH-AHB) on arrival from Australia on 27 April 1937, filmed by Gaumont News, and an Australia-UK record was set. On 24 October 1937 Jean Batten flew to Lympne in a Percival Gull Six (G-ADPR), having set a solo Australia-UK record and female Australia-UK record.

In 1947, four national records were set at the Lympne Air Races.

Distance	Class	Speed	Set by	Aircraft
100 km (62 mi) closed-circuit	Aircraft of any power	496.88 mph (799.65 km/h)	John Cunningham	De Havilland Vampire
100 km (62 mi) closed-circuit	Aircraft fitted with an engine between 6.5 and 9 L (400 and 550 cu in)	178.33 mph (286.99 km/h)	Pat Fillingham	De Havilland T.K.2
100 km (62 mi) closed-circuit	Aircraft fitted with an engine between 4 and 6.5 L (240 and 400 cu in)	178.33 mph (286.99 km/h)	Pat Fillingham	De Havilland T.K.2
100 km (62 mi) closed-circuit	Aircraft fitted with an engine between 2 and 4 L (120 and 240 cu in)	123.72 mph (199.11 km/h)	R I Porteous	Chilton D.W.1

On 8 May 1960, a world record was set for the distance flown by a model aircraft at 45.75 mi (73.63 km). The 8 feet 6 inches (2.59 m) wingspan aircraft had taken off from Lympne and was flown by radio control from cars to Sidcup.

== Cinque Ports Flying Club ==
Club flying started in November 1927 with the East Kent Flying Club and although membership reached 220 by 1931 the club was struggling financially. On 1 January 1932 it became part of Brooklands Aviation and was renamed as the Cinque Ports Flying Club. Lympne was visited by many aviation personalities. Ken Waller learnt to fly at Lympne and became a long-distance and race pilot. W. E. Davis was the secretary/manager of Cinque Ports Flying Club from 1932 until his death in 1938. His wife Ann took over the position in the 18 months leading up to the Second World War. On 22 May 1937 the Duke and Duchess of Kent visited Lympne in an Airspeed Envoy (G-AEXX) of the King's Flight while visiting Shorncliffe Barracks. From 1938 the club participated in the Civil Air Guard training programme, giving subsidised flying lessons. The Currie Wot was designed and built at Lympne. The Cinque Ports Flying Club restarted after the war but folded on 1 October 1948.

== Silver City Airways ==
Silver City Airways moved to Lympne in 1948, operating Bristol Freighter Mk.21 aircraft and an aerial car ferry to Le Touquet started on 13 July 1948. The air ferry was the idea of Griffith J Powell, who wanted to holiday in France but did not like the ferry. Bristol lent an aircraft for an experiment on 7 July 1948. The first car was Powell's Armstrong Siddeley 16 which was carried by G-AGVC.The Bristol Freighter Mk.21 could carry two cars. Although only 170 cars were carried in 1948, experience was gained.

The service was initially operated on a charter basis. Having closed down over the winter, the service was resumed as a scheduled service on 13 April 1949. During 1949, two aircraft carried 2,700 cars. By 1950 the figures had risen to 3,850 cars and 1,000 motorcycles and other vehicles with passengers totalling 15,000. In that year, a London driver offered a London-Paris taxi service. Silver City Airways had estimated that they would carry nearly 7,000 cars in 1953, but this figure was reached in 1951. The three aircraft had to be doubled to six to cope. Over 13,000 vehicles were carried, with 42 return flights daily at peak times. The time between Lympne and Le Touquet was 18 minutes.

In February 1953, Lympne was waterlogged and services were temporarily transferred to Southend. In September waterlogging again stopped the air ferry, which was transferred to RAF West Malling. Six Bristol Freighter Mk.32s were introduced in March 1953, at a cost of £540,000, which could each carry three cars and a service to Ostend was started with the aircraft. Skyways remained at Lympne until October 1954 when it moved to Lydd (Ferryfield). On 3 October 1954, the last Silver City flight to Le Touquet was operated by Bristol Freighter G-AIFV. Silver City moved to Lydd because the runway at Lympne was not suitable. Although it had campaigned for improvements to the runway and was Lympne's biggest customer the airfields owners, the Ministry of Civil Aviation, refused. Silver City said it would build an airport suitable for its needs at Lydd.

== Accidents and incidents ==
- On 29 March 1920, Nieuport Delage 30T F-CGTI of Compagnie générale transaérienne crashed at Lympne.
- On 26 April 1921, Salmson 2.A2 F-CMAE of Compagnie des Messageries Aériennes crashed at Lympne. The aircraft was later repaired and returned to service.
- On 15 November 1921, a Handley Page O/400 suffered engine failure shortly after passing Lympne on a flight from Paris to Croydon, resulting in the loss of a propeller. The aircraft made a forced landing at Lympne, damaging the undercarriage in the process.
- On 24 April 1923, Fokker F.III H-NABS of KLM departed Lympne for Rotterdam and Amsterdam. The aircraft was not heard of again. It was presumed to have crashed into the sea, killing the pilot and both passengers.
- On 7 May 1923, Farman F.63bis Goliath F-AEGP Flandre was involved in an accident at Lympne.
- On 8 February 1925, Farman Goliath F-GEAB of Air Union crashed whilst attempting to land at Lympne. The aircraft was on a cargo flight from Paris to Croydon when an engine failed over the Channel.
- On 18 August 1926, Blériot 155 F-AIEB Wilbur Wright of Air Union crashed 2 mi (3.2 km) south of Lympne, killing both crew and two passengers.
- On 17 January 1931, Breguet 280T F-AIVU of Air Union crashed whilst attempting to land at Lympne. The aircraft caught the boundary fence and crashed onto the airfield, damaging the forward fuselage and undercarriage. Of the eight people on board, one of the crew was injured.
- On 9 December 1937, Handley Page H.P.45 G-AAXD Horatius of Imperial Airways was struck by lightning whilst flying across the Channel from Paris to Croydon. A precautionary landing was made at Lympne where it was found that minor damage had been done to a wing.
- On 12 March 1938, ST25 Monospar G-AEJV crashed near Lympne when both engines cut out. Pilot Bill Davis, managing director of the Cinque Ports Flying Club, was among the four people killed.
- On 1 June 1938, Fokker F.VIIb/3m OO-AIL of SABENA crashed into the grounds of Sellindge Methodist Church whilst attempting to land at Lympne during a thunderstorm.
- In September 1938, Handley Page H.P.45 G-AAXD Horatius of Imperial Airways suffered damage to its port undercarriage and lower port wing in a forced landing at Lympne. The aircraft was repaired and returned to service.
- On 7 July 1939, de Havilland Hornet Moth G-AFAT crashed a Lympne, killing racing driver Clifton Penn-Hughes and his passengers.
- On 11 January 1947, Douglas DC-3 G-AGJX of British Overseas Airways Corporation crashed at Stowting. Six people were killed and ten injured. The aircraft was attempting to reach Lympne when it ran out of fuel, having aborted an attempt to land at Bordeaux Airport and other French airfields being closed due to fog. The aircraft was operating an international scheduled passenger flight with a final destination in West Africa
- On 3 May 1949, Miles Aerovan G-AJKM of East Anglian Flying Services Ltd was blown over whilst being refuelled and damaged beyond economic repair.
- On 30 June 1950, DH.89 Dragon Rapide G-AKME caught fire whilst being refuelled and was burnt out.
- On 1 May 1961, DH.89 Dragon Rapide G-AGOJ was damaged beyond economic repair in a landing accident at Lympne.
- On 11 July 1965. Avro 748 G-ARMV of Skyways Coach-Air arriving from Beauvais was written off at Lympne when its nose-wheels dug into soft ground on the grass runway. The aircraft flipped over, losing its port wing in the process.

== In popular culture ==
RAF Lympne features as a level within the game WW2 Rebuilder under its original name. The player has to rebuild the damaged facility and convert it for civilian air ferry services

== Sources ==
- Collyer, David G (1992). Lympne Airport in old photographs. Stroud: Alan Sutton Publishing Ltd. ISBN 0-7509-0169-1.
- Delve, Ken (2005). The Military Airfields of Britain. Southern England: Kent, Hampshire, Surrey and Sussex. Ramsbury: The Crowood Press Ltd. ISBN 1-86126-729-0.
- Gunston, Bill (1976). "de Havilland Airco D.H.4.". Combat Aircraft (Salamander ed.). Hamlyn. ISBN 0-600-33144-X. "160 hp BHP (Beardmore-Halford-Pullinger) engine,"
- Lee, David W. (2010). Action Stations Revisited, Volume 3 South East England. Crecy Publishing Ltd. ISBN 978-0-85979-110-6.
- Warlow, Ben (2000). Shore Establishments of the Royal Navy. Liskeard, Cornwall: Maritime Books. ISBN 0-907771-73-4.
- Woodley, Charles (1992). Golden Age – British Civil Aviation 1945–1965. Shrewsbury: Airlife. ISBN 1-85310-259-8.
