= 1965 Skyways Coach-Air Avro 748 crash =

Aviation incident in England

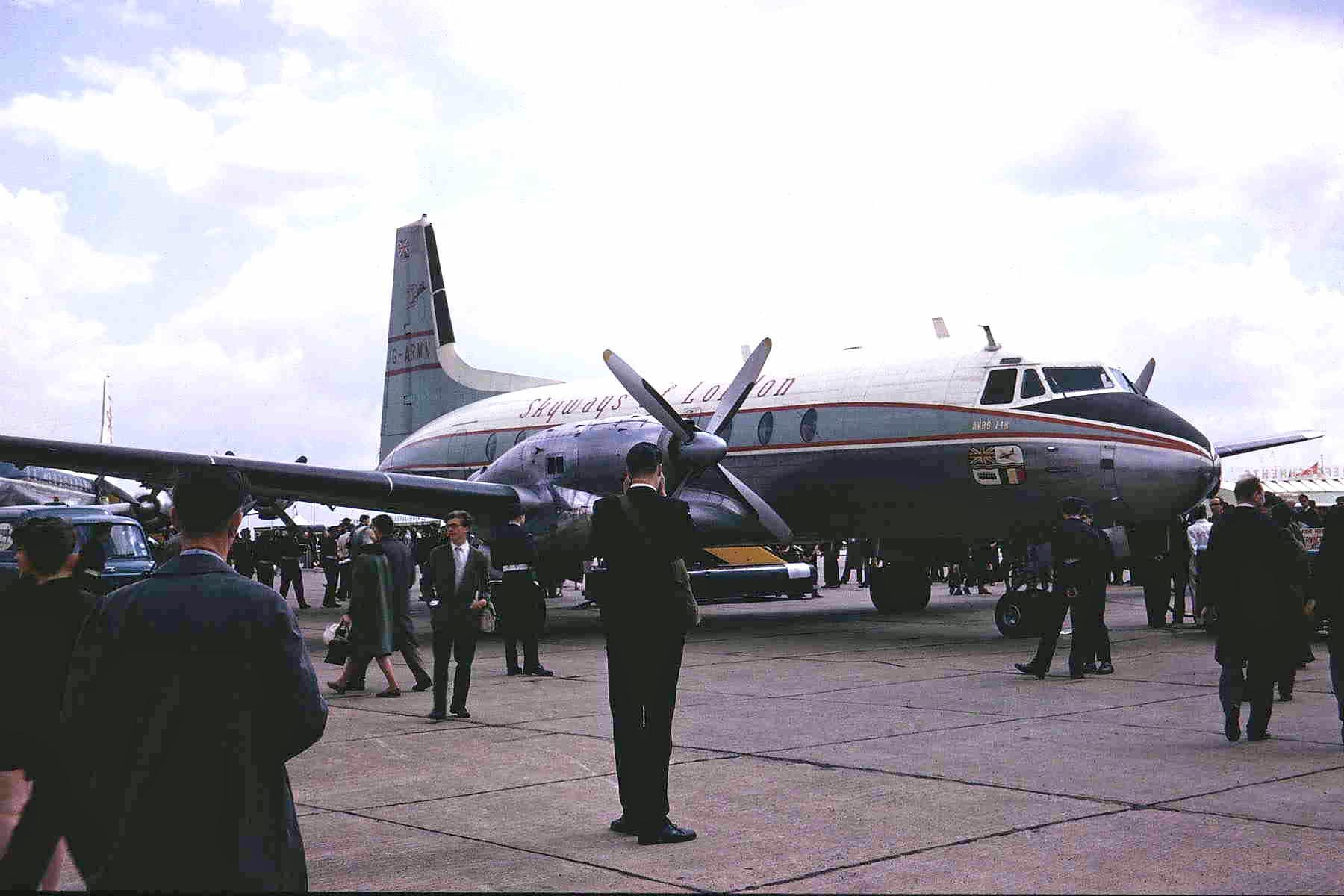
- G-ARMV, the accident aircraft

Accident
- Date: 11 July 1965
- Summary: Defective infrastructure, pilot error
- Site: Lympne Airport, Kent, United Kingdom; 51°05′N 1°01′E

Aircraft
- Aircraft type: Avro 748-101 Series 1
- Operator: Skyways Coach-Air
- Registration: G-ARMV
- Flight origin: Beauvais Airport, Oise, France
- Destination: Lympne Airport, Kent, United Kingdom
- Passengers: 48
- Crew: 4
- Fatalities: 0
- Injuries: 3+
- Survivors: 52

The 1965 Skyways Coach-Air Avro 748 crash occurred on 11 July 1965 when Avro 748-101 Series 1 G-ARMV, flown during a scheduled international passenger flight from Beauvais Airport, Oise, France, crashed on landing at its intended destination of Lympne Airport, Kent, United Kingdom. The accident was due to the grass runway being unable to support the weight of the aircraft during a heavy landing. This caused the nose wheels to dig in and the aircraft to overturn, losing both wings and the starboard tailplane in the process. All 52 people on board survived. This was the first accident involving the Avro 748/HS 748 that resulted in a write-off. A concrete runway was later installed at Lympne.

== Aircraft ==
The accident aircraft was Avro 748-101 Series 1 G-ARMV, c/n 1536. The aircraft was manufactured in 1961 and had flown 3,432 hours at the time of the accident.

== Accident ==
The aircraft was deployed as a scheduled international passenger flight from Beauvais Airport, Oise, France to Lympne Airport, Kent, United Kingdom. This flight was part of Skyways Coach Air's coach-air service, in which passengers were taken by coach from Paris to Beauvais, flown to Lympne and then taken by coach to London.

The aircraft departed Beauvais at 15:51 UTC (16:51 local time) carrying 4 crew and 48 passengers. The weather at Lympne at the time the aircraft departed Beauvais indicated that visibility was 2,000 metres (2,200 yd), with wind at 18 knots (33 km/h) from 220° and a cloudbase of 250 feet (76 m). After passing Abbeville, an updated weather report was sent to the aircraft which showed a visibility of 1,000 metres (1,100 yd) in drizzle, cloudbase 250 feet (76 m) and winds of 18 knots (33 km/h) from 220°, gusting to 26 knots (48 km/h). The visibility was below the minimum requirement of 1,100 metres (1,200 yd) for landing, although the captain was later informed that visibility had "improved slightly".

At 3.5 nautical miles (6.5 km) from touchdown, an IFR approach was initiated under the guidance of the radar controller at Lympne. When the aircraft was 0.5 nautical miles (0.93 km) from the airport, it was at an altitude of 220 feet (67 m) above airport level. The captain reported that he could see the end of Runway 20 through the drizzle. At 0.25 nautical miles (0.46 km) from touchdown, the aircraft ran into severe turbulence and drifted to the right of the runway centre-line. Full flap was applied and power was reduced. The aircraft crossed the airfield boundary at 92 knots (170 km/h), reducing to 88 knots (163 km/h) as the landing flare was begun at a height of 40 feet (12 m). As the throttles were closed, the starboard wing dropped and the rate of descent of the aircraft increased. The captain attempted to keep the aircraft level, with the result that it landed heavily. The nose wheel dug into the grass runway, flipping the aircraft onto its back, as the aircraft spun through 180° and ended up facing in the direction from which it had approached; the upside-down aircraft then slid for 400 yards (370 m), ripping off both wings and the starboard tailplane, and crushing the tail.

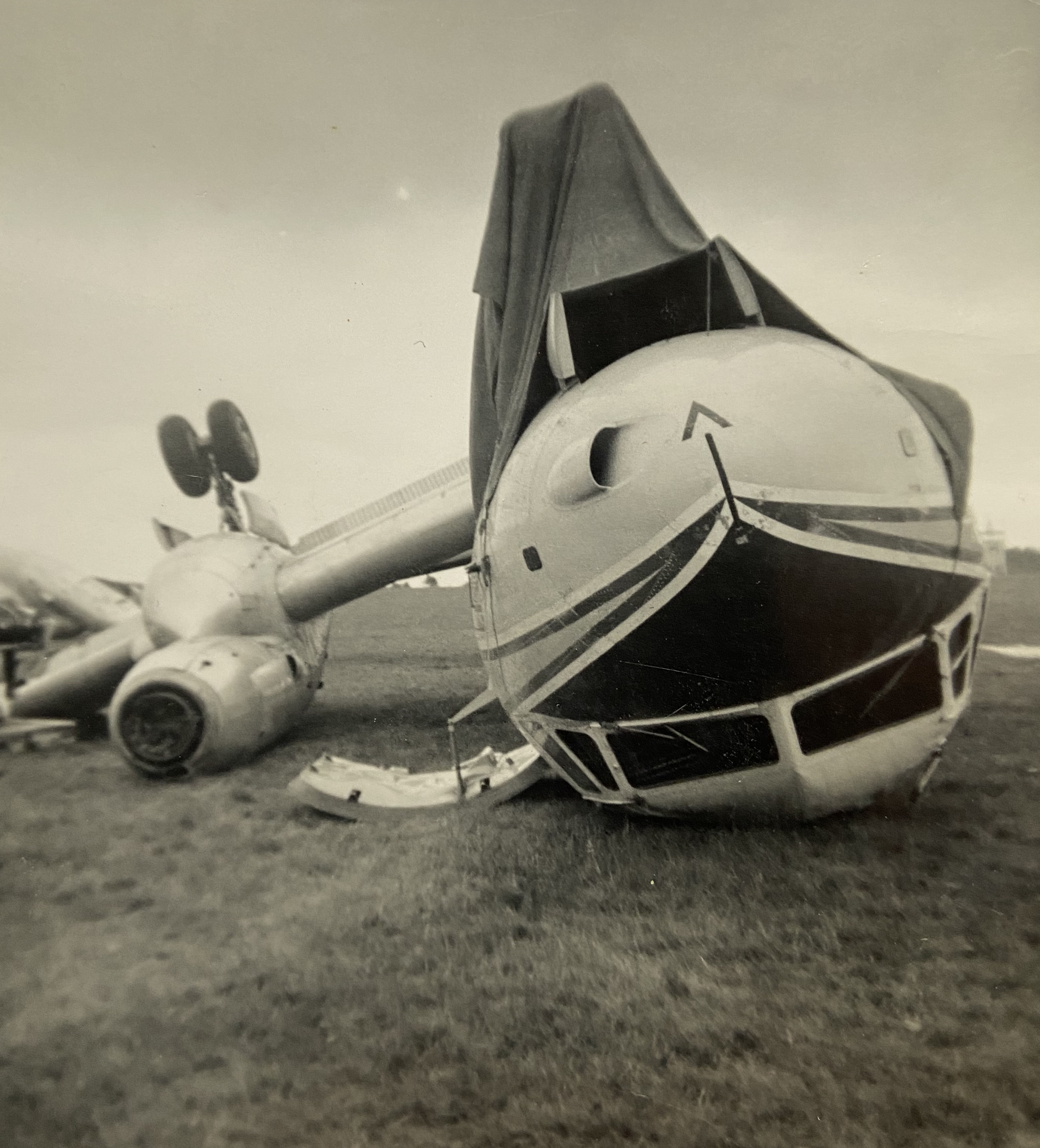
Wreckage of G-ARMV

The passengers were left hanging upside-down in their seats. One mother was holding a baby that was not strapped in. All on board escaped from the aircraft, with three people needing to be treated in hospital suffering from shock. A number of passengers were also treated at Lympne. Thirty-six of the passengers continued their journey to London, some with fuel-soaked clothing. The aircraft, with a replacement cost of £250,000, was written off. This was the first Avro 748/HS 748 to be written off in an accident. Skyways Coach-Air leased an Avro 748 from LIAT for two years in 1968 to replace the aircraft lost.

The grass runway at Lympne had previously suffered from waterlogging, leading to the closure of the airport in December 1951, and again in February 1953. A new 4,500 feet (1,400 m) concrete runway was constructed in early 1968, coming into use on 11 April.

== Investigation ==
An investigation into the accident was opened by the Accidents Investigation Branch. The probable cause of the accident was stated to be "a heavy landing following an incomplete flare from a steeper than normal approach."

== Sources ==
- Collyer, David G (1992). Lympne Airport in old photographs. Stroud: Alan Sutton Publishing Ltd. ISBN 0-7509-0169-1.
- Denham, Terry (1996). World Directory of Airliner Crashes. Sparkford: Patrick Stephens Ltd. ISBN 1-85260-554-5.
