= Skyways Coach-Air =

British airline (1956–1971)

Skyways Coach-Air Ltd
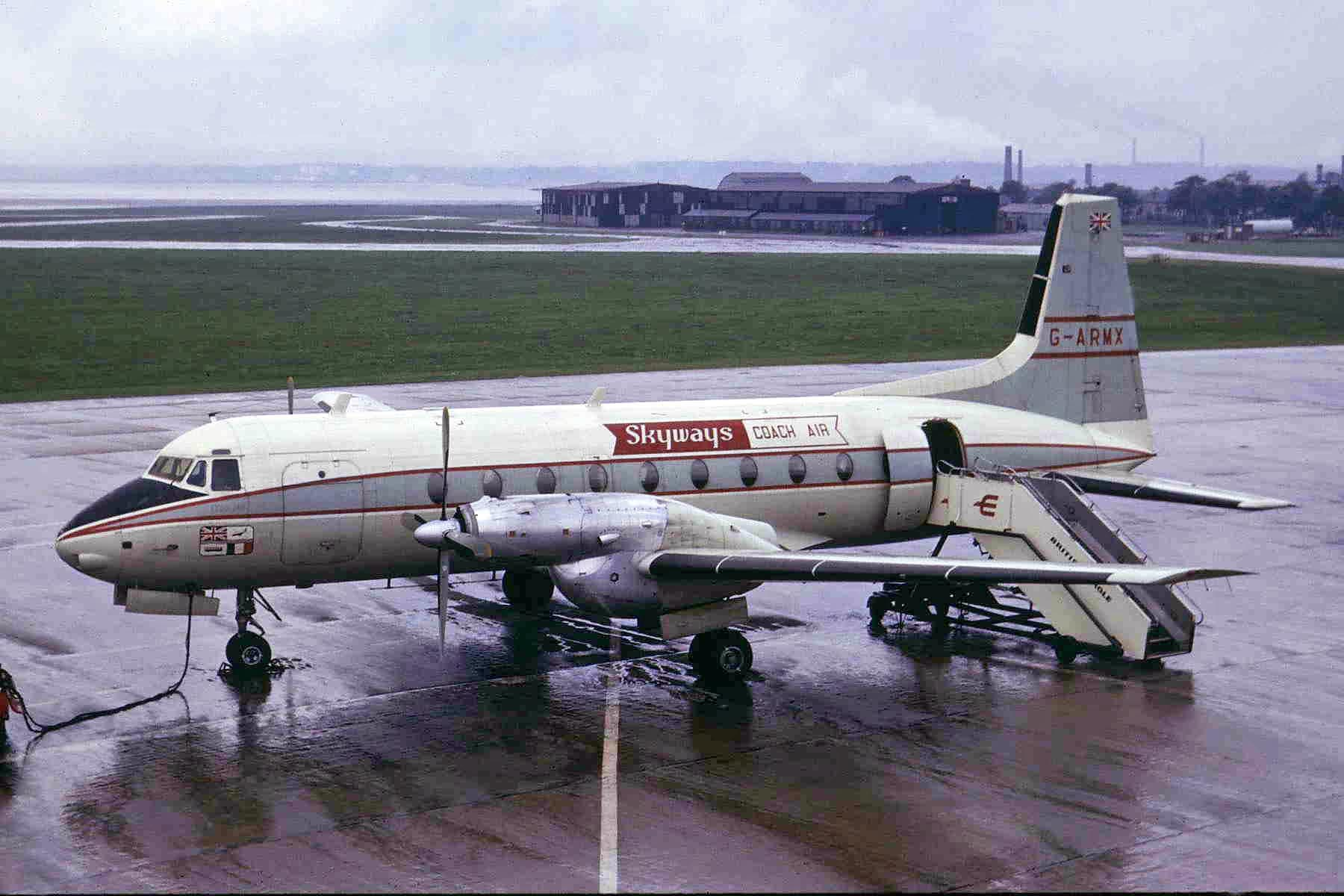
- A Skyways Coach-Air Hawker Siddeley HS 748
IATA	ICAO	Call sign
SX	—	—
- Founded: 1956
- Ceased operations: 1971
- Hubs: Lympne Airport; Gatwick Airport
- Fleet size: 8 aircraft (5 Hawker Siddeley 748 Series 1, 3 Douglas DC-3 (as of March 1970))
- Destinations: United Kingdom; Europe
- Headquarters: Lympne
- Key people: Eric Rylands, Gordon Sykes, J.M. Warrell, R. Chadwick, J.L. Clarke, J. McTaggart, D. Clark, Capt. R.H. Tapley

Skyways Coach-Air Limited was the world's first low-cost airline.

Skyways launched the first commercial coach-air operation in late-September 1955, involving a coach trip from Central London to Lympne, a cross-Channel Lympne—Beauvais air sector and another coach journey from Beauvais to the centre of Paris.

Skyways Coach-Air, which had remained a separate entity following the sale of sister airline Skyways Ltd to Euravia, got into financial difficulties in 1970. This resulted in a management buyout and the following year's formation of a new company trading as Skyways International to succeed the defunct Skyways Coach-Air. Skyways International was taken over by Dan-Air in 1972.

== History ==
=== Skyways Coach-Air ===
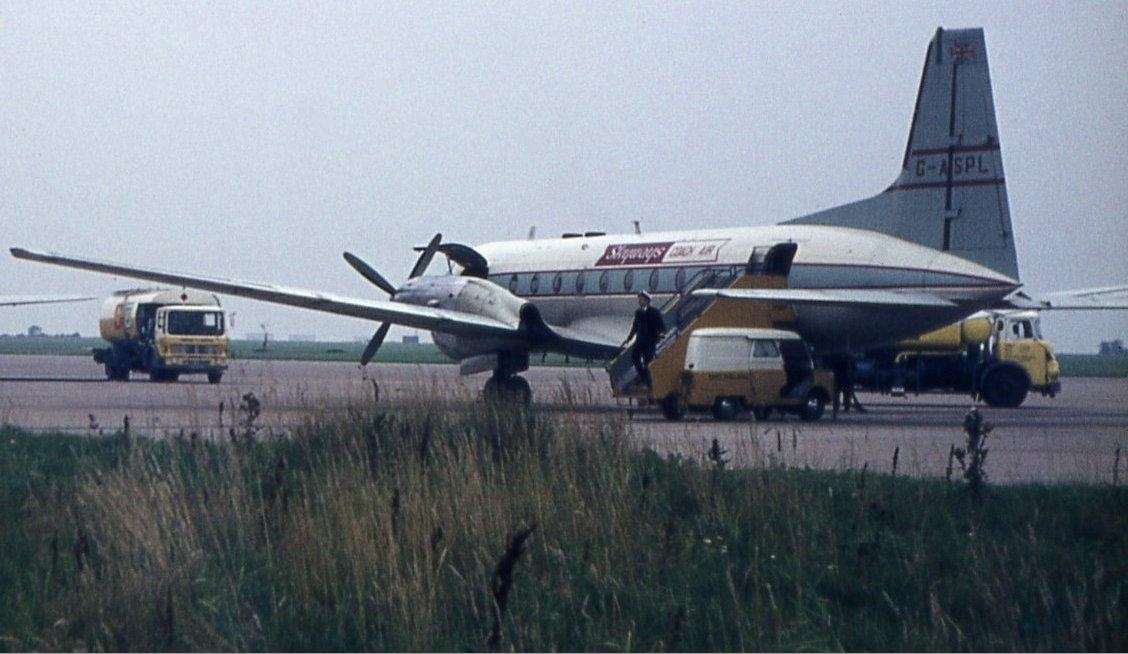
Skyways Coach-Air Avro 748 in the late-1960s

On 30 September 1955, Skyways inaugurated the world's first combined coach-air low-fare scheduled service between London and Paris. On that day, a 36-seat Skyways Douglas DC-3 took off from Lympne for a 55-minute cross-Channel flight to Beauvais with fare-paying passengers for the first time. (Two "special inaugural flights" carrying about 50 Government officials, company executives, journalists and other dignitaries preceded the inaugural commercial flight on 21 September 1955.) This air service formed part of a combined coach-air-coach journey between the city centres of London and Paris. For passengers travelling from London to Paris, the journey began on a 32- or 36-seater East Kent Road Car Company coach that took them from London's Victoria Coach Station to Lympne Airport near Hythe where they transferred to a Skyways DC-3. This aircraft flew them across the Channel to Beauvais Tillé Airport where passengers transferred to a Transports Renault coach, which took them to République Coach Station in Paris (Hôtel Moderne Palace on Place de la République, Paris 12). At the time of launch, total travelling time was just under seven hours. (In the pre-motorway days, the 70-mile (110 kilometre) coach journey between Central London and Lympne along some narrow, winding country roads, and through London, Maidstone & many villages, alone took more than three hours. Following subsequent road improvements, the introduction of faster coaches and aircraft as well as streamlined ground handling procedures, this eventually reduced to about 5½ hours.) The initial frequency was one round-trip per day, and the inaugural return fare was £7 14s (Note: pre-decimalisation) (£7.70 (Note: post-decimalisation)) for off-peak travel while the peak-time fare was £8.75. (Note: decimal) These not only undercut the direct London Heathrow—Paris Orly/Le Bourget standard tourist class air fares of British European Airways (BEA) and Air France by about 45% but were also cheaper than the corresponding fares of competing surface travel modes.

London—Paris coach-air services launched with a single DC-3 configured in a high-density, 36-seat layout. A second DC-3 sourced from the fleet of sister company Skyways Ltd and a third aircraft leased from Airwork were added for the 1956 summer season. This fleet subsequently expanded through the addition of further aircraft.

Following the successful introduction of the world's first, daily coach-air service between London and Paris on a year-round basis, Eric Rylands Ltd, the Skyways group holding company, purchased Lympne Airport in 1956.

During the 1957 summer season, Skyways Coach-Air increased the frequency to up to 16 daily round-trips and launched its second coach-air route from London to Vichy (via Lympne).

In 1958, Skyways Coach-Air Ltd was formed as a dedicated low-fare coach-air-coach subsidiary of Skyways Ltd.

A London—Brussels coach-air service (via Lympne and Antwerp) operated during the 1958 summer season for the duration of Expo 58. Also in 1958, further seasonal coach-air services from London (Lympne) to Lyons, Montpellier and Nice launched while coach-air services to Clermont-Ferrand began in June 1964. Services from London (Lympne) to Tours and from East Midlands to Beauvais started in 1965. Operations from London (Ashford and Luton) to Ostend commenced in 1970. The airline also applied for traffic rights to extend its coach-air network to Basel, Palma de Mallorca, Barcelona and Tenerife.

Lympne's persistent waterlogging problem forced many flights to divert to Gatwick, especially in winter. During the late-1950s and early-1960s, Skyways Coach-Air's DC-3s also operated regular charter flights from Gatwick.

Following an announcement in 1959 to replace its ageing piston airliners with state-of-the-art turboprops that resulted in a competition between Avro and Fokker where the former's 748 was pitched against the latter's F-27, Skyways Coach-Air became the launch customer for the Avro 748 in 1961.

Meanwhile, Skyways Coach-Air had assumed the ownership of the lease for Lympne Airport, which entailed taking on all operational responsibilities, including the provision of air traffic control (ATC) services.

Delivery of the first of three 48-seat Avro 748s on 2 November 1961 was followed by the type's first revenue flight on 17 April 1962, when it began replacing the 36-seat DC-3s on the daily Lympne—Beauvais coach-air service. Two more 748s and a fifth DC-3 for cargo and supplemental work joined the fleet during summer 1965. By 1967, Skyways Coach-Air operated the original London—Paris coach-air service exclusively with the new 748 turboprops at a frequency of five daily round-trips in summer, (Note: April to September) with additional services operating on Mondays, Fridays and Sundays. In winter, (Note: October to March) frequency dropped to between one and two round-trips per day. Typical London—Paris return fares ranged from £9 8s (Note: pre-decimal) to £12 17s. (Note: pre-decimal)

To take advantage of the burgeoning market for all-inclusive holiday charter packages and increase the 748s' utilisation, Skyways Coach-Air began operating a series of inclusive tour (IT) charter flights to the Mediterranean from the grass airfield at Lympne in summer 1967. This soon overstretched the airline's small fleet and led to frequent delays and diversions, exacerbated by the airport's waterlogging problem. As a result of knock-on effects, it also resulted in a deterioration of the company's punctuality on the coach-air network.

Nineteen-sixty-seven was also the year the state-owned Transport Holding Company (THC) had acquired a 50% stake in Skyways Coach-Air for £27,000. This made it a semi-public entity.

To address Lympne's waterlogging problem ahead of the 1968 summer season, Skyways Coach-Air's management decided to have a 4,500 feet (1,372 metre) concrete runway laid. This work was executed during the lean months in winter 1967/8. The new runway became operational in April 1968. As the concrete layer proved to be too thin to withstand regular operations by aircraft in the Avro 748 weight category, cracks soon started to appear.

In 1969, Ford awarded Skyways Coach-Air the Stansted—Cologne corporate shuttle contract. This resulted in one of the airline's 748s being permanently based at the Essex airport.

This was also the time Lympne Airport was renamed Ashford Airport.

Although Skyways Coach-Air seemed to have initially succeeded in establishing itself as a profitable short-haul specialist serving a niche market for those looking for the cheapest way to travel between London and Paris, the business began losing money in its latter years as a result of overreaching itself.

Initially, the airline attempted to turn around its deteriorating financial situation by dropping underperforming routes from its network, terminating operations to Ostend, Tours and Vichy. However, these measures proved inadequate to deal with the company's growing financial difficulties. In addition, Britain's then Conservative government's was unwilling to lend it any more money through half-shareholder THC. This resulted in the latter putting Skyways Coach-Air into receivership at the beginning of 1971. (Note: Skyways Coach-Air owed the Government £1.25 million, as a result of loans THC had already advanced it) Following its grounding, Skyways Coach-Air went into liquidation on 20 January 1971.

==== Fleet Details ====
Skyways Coach-Air Ltd operated the following aircraft types:

- Avro/Hawker Siddeley 748
- Douglas DC-3

===== Fleet in 1962 =====
In April 1962, the Skyways Coach-Air fleet comprised 7 aircraft.

Skyways Coach-Air fleet in April 1962
Aircraft	Total
Avro 748 Series 1	3
Douglas DC-3	4
Total	7

===== Fleet in 1970 =====
In March 1970, the Skyways Coach-Air fleet comprised 8 aircraft.

Skyways Coach-Air fleet in March 1970
Aircraft	Total
Hawker Siddeley 748 Series 1	5
Douglas DC-3	3
Total	8

Skyways Coach-Air employed 320 people at this time.

Skyways International
- Founded: 1971
- Ceased operations: 1972
- Hubs: Ashford Airport
- Fleet size: 7 aircraft (4 Hawker Siddeley 748 Series 1, 3 Douglas DC-3 (as of May 1971))
- Destinations: United Kingdom; Europe
- Headquarters: Lympne
- Key people: Sydney Davidson, John W. Knox, L. Hastings, Peter C.G. Abbott, John L. Clarke, Nigel C. Warshaw, D. Brownswood, J. Warrell, D. Clark

=== Skyways International ===
In February 1971, a group of former Skyways Coach-Air senior managers led by John Knox, the erstwhile airline's last commercial manager, formed International Skyways Ltd as a successor to the failed company. With the backing of London merchant bank Sterling Industrial Securities, the new management team purchased defunct Skyways Coach-Air's assets. These included aircraft and routes. Following the successful management buyout, the new entity began trading as Skyways International. It resumed the ex-Skyways Coach-Air year-round route from Ashford to Beauvais on 8 February 1971 with four 748s that had been grounded at Ashford Airport since the cessation of operations three weeks earlier. This was followed by the reintroduction of routes from Ashford to Ostend, Clermont-Ferrand and Montpellier, as well as from Luton to Ostend and from East Midlands to Beauvais.

In February 1972, Sterling Industrial Securities sold International Skyways to Dan-Air for £650,000. (Note: £625,000 for the four ex-Skyways HS 748s and £25,000 for the defunct airline's vehicles) Dan-Air completed the deal to take over International Skyways from Sterling Industrial Securities in April of that year, following which it integrated most of the former Skyways International routes into its own network of regional, short-haul scheduled services. Initially, these routes were operated by a separate subsidiary named Dan-Air Skyways. Dan-Air Skyways fuselage titles were applied to the four HS 748s Dan-Air inherited from Skyways International.

By 1974, Dan-Air Skyways was fully integrated with the rest of Dan-Air's scheduled operation, as a result of which it ceased to exist as a separate entity and the full Dan-Air livery had been applied to all former Skyways International aircraft.

==== Fleet Details ====
International Skyways Ltd (trading as Skyways International) operated the following aircraft types:

- Hawker Siddeley 748
- Douglas DC-3

===== Fleet in 1971 =====
In May 1971, the Skyways International fleet comprised 7 aircraft.

Skyways International fleet in May 1971
Aircraft	Total
Hawker Siddeley 748 Series 1	4
Douglas DC-3	3
Total	7

Skyways International employed 303 people at this time.

== Accidents and incidents ==
There are two recorded accidents/incidents involving Skyways Coach-Air. These are listed below.

- On 11 July 1965, Avro 748-101 Series 1 of Skyways Coach-Air (registration: G-ARMV) arriving from Beauvais was written off at Lympne when its nosewheels dug into soft ground on the grass runway following a heavy landing. The aircraft flipped over, losing its port wing in the process. Aided by the flight attendant Ann Playfoot, all 48 passengers managed to escape unhurt.
- On 17 December 1965, Douglas C-47B of Skyways Coach-Air (registration: G-AMWX) was written off when it made an emergency landing on the beach at Mers-les-Bains, Somme, France. The aircraft was operating a scheduled international passenger flight from Beauvais to Gatwick, when it turned back to Beauvais due to radio failure shortly before it was scheduled to land at Gatwick. The 32 occupants aided by the flight pilot Tom Mac Evoy and the flight attendant Miss Bryce managed to escape. There were no fatalities among the occupants (three crew and 29 passengers) as a result of this incident.

== See also ==
- List of defunct airlines of the United Kingdom

== Notes and citations ==
Notes

Citations

== Sources ==
- "Flight International". Flight International. Sutton, UK: Reed Business Information. ISSN 0015-3710. (various backdated issues relating to Skyways Ltd, Skyways Coach-Air, and Skyways International 1955-1972)
- Simons, Graham M. (1993). The Spirit of Dan-Air. Peterborough, UK: GMS Enterprises. ISBN 1-870384-20-2.
- Eglin, Roger & Ritchie, Berry (1980). Fly me, I'm Freddie. London, England: Weidenfeld & Nicolson. ISBN 0-297-77746-7.
- "Airliner World (Skyways: Coach Air, New ventures, Another turbulent spell)". Airliner World. Stamford, UK: Key Publishing: 66–69. November 2011. ISSN 1465-6337. (Airliner World online)
