= Pat Fillingham =

English test pilot for the de Havilland company

- Born: William Patrick Ingram Fillingham; 27 February 1914; Sutton Coldfield, Warwickshire, England
- Died: 17 July 2003 (aged 89); Dacorum, Hertfordshire, England
- Occupations: Aeronautical Engineer and Test Pilot
- Known for: de Havilland test pilot

William Patrick Ingram Fillingham FRAeS (27 February 1914 – 17 July 2003) was an English test pilot for the de Havilland company. Fillingham flew 120 different types of aircraft during his career including all variants of the de Havilland Mosquito.

== Early life ==
Fillingham was born in 1914 in Sutton Coldfield and he was educated at Worksop College and the de Havilland Aeronautical Technical School. Fillingham learned to fly with the Royal Air Force Volunteer Reserve at Perth in Scotland, he flew his first solo in February 1937. He graduated from the de Havilland technical school in 1939 as an aeronautical engineer and joined the parent company de Havilland as a test pilot.

== Wartime test pilot ==
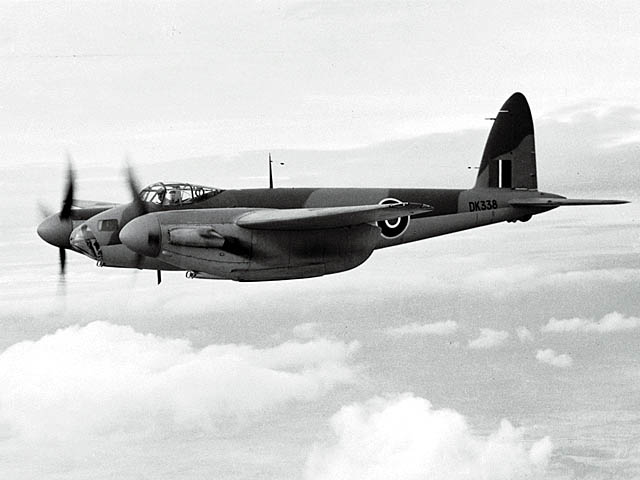
Mosquito in 1943

With the start of the Second World War the company had an increase in aircraft production and by April 1940 Fillingham was test flying 150 de Havilland Tiger Moth biplane trainers a month. By September 1942 he was the chief production test pilot flying new de Havilland Mosquito twin-engine light bombers. In 1943 he went to the de Havilland subsidiaries in Toronto and Sydney to advise them how to test fly the Mosquito, during his stay in Canada he demonstrated the Mosquito at a number of Canadian air bases and also to the United States Army Air Force. With production of the Mosquito in England increased to a five a day Fillingham flew a record 2,200 flights in the Mosquito. As well as the Mosquito he also flew the twin-engined De Havilland Hornet, at the time the fastest propeller aircraft in the world.

== Peacetime test pilot ==
With the end of the war Fillingham still had plenty to do as de Havilland produced the Dove and Heron commercial transports. He flew the prototype de Havilland Canada Chipmunk in Canada in 1946. Military aircraft were still produced and as well as the Dove and Heron, Fillingham is also recorded as flying in the same month de Havilland Vampire jet fighters, de Havilland Canada Chipmunk trainers and Mosquitos.

As the company moved into the 1950s Fillingham test flew the four-engined de Havilland Comet airliner and then the three-engine de Havilland Trident airliner. In 1972 he delivered a Trident to China, the first western jet to be imported. By 1975 De Havilland had become Hawker Siddeley Aviation and Fillingham was Deputy Chief Test Pilot when he decided to retire. His last few flying years for Hawker Siddeley he flew the Hawker Siddeley HS.125 as well as display flying the then last flying Mosquito. Fillingham had 11,450 hours on 120 different aircraft types during his career. In 1970 he was awarded a Queen's Commendation for Valuable Service in the Air.

== Family life and leisure ==
Fillingham had married Sonja Couper in 1952 and they had a daughter and a son. As well as his duties as a test pilot Fillingham also flew in air races winning the Goodyear Trophy in 1952 and the King's Cup in 1953 flying a de Havilland Canada Chipmunk. Fillingham owned a number of vintage motor cars and took part in three Monte Carlo Rallies. Fillingham died on 17 July 2003 aged 89.
