= Skyways (British airline) =

Airline of the United Kingdom (1946–1962)

Skyways Ltd. and Skyways of London
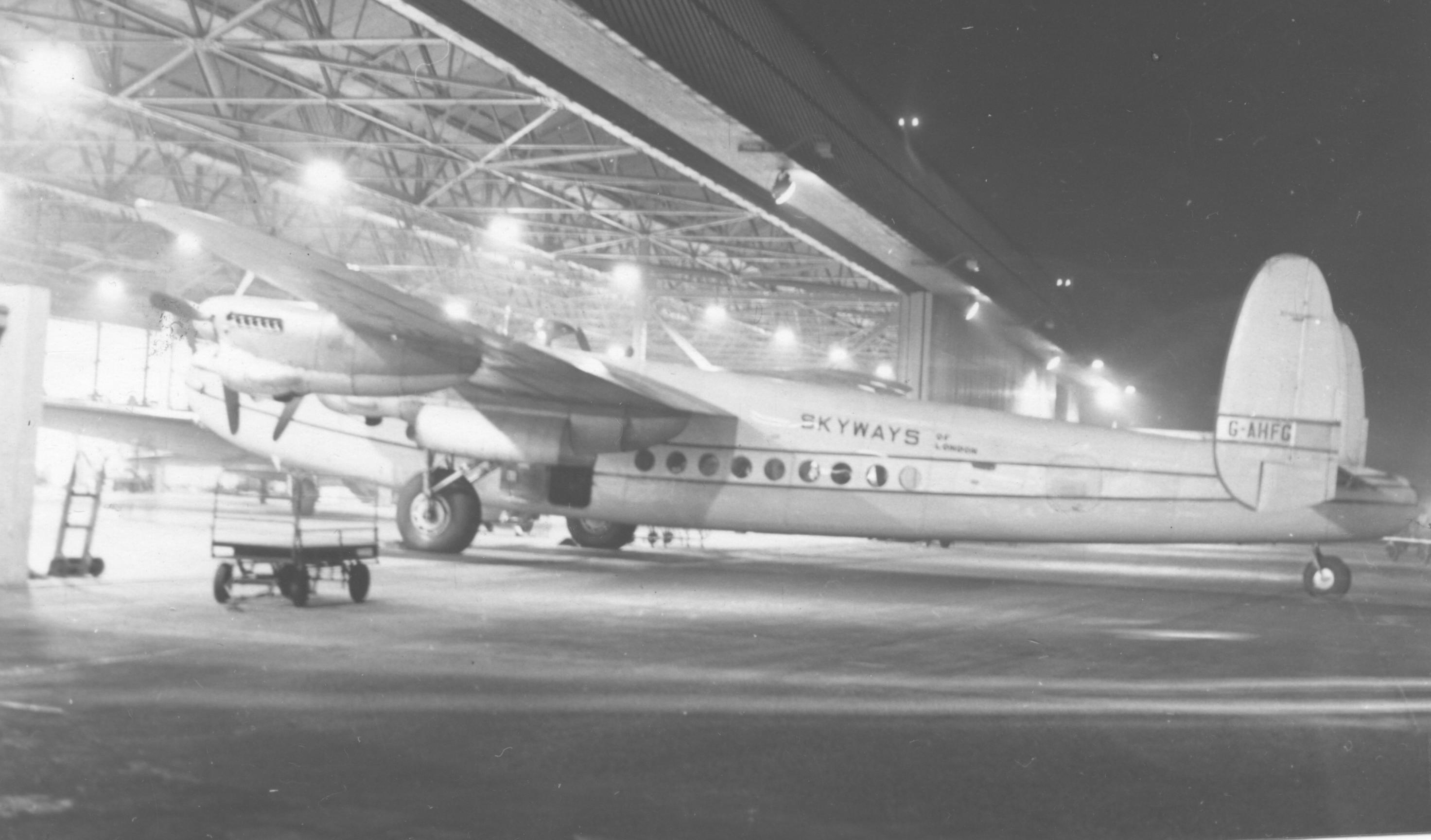
- Avro 685 York, 1952
- Founded: March 1946 as Skyways Ltd. - 31 March 1950 as Skyways of London
- Commenced operations: May 1946 as Skyways Ltd. - April 1950 as Skyways of London
- Ceased operations: 1 March 1950 as Skyways Ltd. - 1962 as Skyways of London; name kept until full merger into Euravia in 1964
- Operating bases: Langley Airfield; Dunsfold Aerodrome; Bovingdon Airfield; London–Stansted; London–Heathrow; London–Gatwick
- Fleet size: 9 aircraft (4 Lockheed L-749A Constellation, 1 Handley Page HP.81 Hermes, 4 Avro 685 York (as of April 1962))
- Destinations: worldwide
- Headquarters: Central London
- Key people: Brig. Gen. Alfred Critchley; Sir Alan Cobham; Sir Wavell Wakefield; Eric Rylands

Skyways Ltd. was an early post-World War II British airline re-formed in 1946 out pre-1945 assets that soon became well-established as the biggest operator of non-scheduled air services in Europe.

Its principal activities included the operation of worldwide non-scheduled passenger and cargo services, including trooping and oil industry support flights, inclusive tour (IT) and ad hoc charters for automobile industry executives as well as specialist freight services.

The re-formed airline operated its first flight in May 1946 with an Avro York that had been chartered by the Anglo-Iranian Oil Company to carry oil personnel and freight from Langley to Basra via Manston, Malta, Cairo and Lydda.

Skyways was a major civilian participant in the Berlin Airlift and became one of Britain's foremost independent (Note: independent from government owned corporations) airlines during the 1950s and early 1960s.

Following the airline's liquidation in March 1950 and transfer of the bankrupt carrier's assets to a new company again incorporating the name Skyways, control passed to the Lancashire Aircraft Corporation (LAC) in March 1952. LAC's acquisition of Skyways resulted in concentration of the combined group's operations at London Stansted Airport. All this was completely carried out on 31 March with the legal establishment of Skyways of London Ltd. which started flight operations at once.

Low-fare scheduled services commenced in November 1953.

Launch of the world's first Coach-Air operation in 1955 resulted in a demerger that saw those services transferred to new subsidiary Skyways Coach-Air Limited but not before 1958.

A number of financial reorganisations during the 1950s provided the funds for a major expansion of Skyways's activities and fleet, culminating in the buyout of the company in 1961 by Eric Rylands, LAC's former co-owner and managing director.

Loss of a major freight contract that had accounted for 75% of Skyways's revenue, a failed investment in a regional Caribbean airline and an expensive aircraft lease led to renewed financial difficulties in 1962. This resulted in Skyways's takeover by newly formed charter operator Euravia the same year.

A new Skyways emerged in 1975 when, still under Eric Rylands's stewardship, Skyways Cargo Airline assumed the original Skyways's air freight business. Financial difficulties following a period of expansion during the second half of the 1970s led to the cessation of operations in 1980, resulting in the final disappearance of the Skyways name from the UK air transport scene.

== History ==
=== Pre WWII ===
Skyways was incorporated in 1929 to provide "instruction in aviation and aerial navigation, aerial and ground signalling", with a W. Knox as chairman and managing director.

Following the end of World War II, the Skyways name was transferred to a newly formed airline operating worldwide, non-scheduled passenger and cargo flights. Former British Overseas Airways Corporation (BOAC) Director General Brigadier General A.C. Critchley was appointed Skyways's new chairman while inflight refuelling pioneer Sir Alan Cobham became its deputy chairman. Veteran aviator Captain R.J. Ashley assumed the role of managing director.

=== Early operations in 1940s ===
Skyways Ltd. was established in March 1946 and commercial operations commenced on 14 May with an Avro York christened Skyway and featuring 30 red leather, armchair-type seats. Captain Ashley was at the controls of the inaugural flight carrying oil industry personnel and freight under contract to the Anglo-Iranian Oil Company from Langley Airfield to Basra, Iraq, via RAF Manston, Malta, Cairo, Egypt, and RAF Lydda, Palestine. This flight formed part of a charter contract for regular passenger and cargo services between the United Kingdom and Persian Gulf, operated with Yorks at a frequency of two return flights per week. Originally, this had envisaged the use of RAF Northolt as London terminal. However, the Ministry of Civil Aviation's refusal to grant private airlines access to Northolt together with Langley's lack of Customs facilities necessitated a stop at Manston before leaving the UK. There was also a night stop in Cairo on each leg of the journey. Each round-trip involved 35 flying hours and took four days to complete.

The initial fleet comprised six aircraft: two Avro Yorks, two Avro Lancastrians, a de Havilland Dove and a de Havilland Dragon Rapide. The Yorks and Lancastrians were employed on long-range passenger and cargo flights while the Doves and Rapides were used for shorter distance passenger charters.

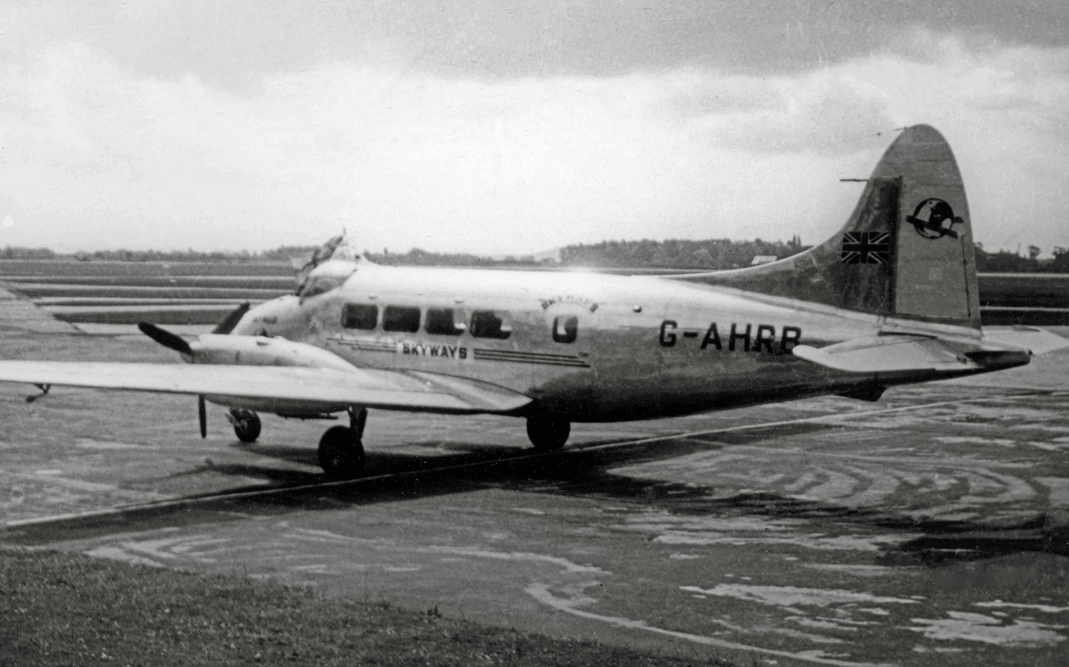
DH 104 Dove in 1948

Following the launch of operations from Langley, Berkshire, by November 1946, Skyways had moved its main operating base to Dunsfold Aerodrome near Guildford in Surrey.

The first year of operations saw Skyway joined by a second York named Sky Courier. Both aircraft were kept busy transporting oil company personnel between the UK and Iraq.

In addition to oil industry support flights, which accounted for the bulk of its operations, Skyways undertook 'aerial cruises' to Zürich in Switzerland for Sir Henry Lunn Ltd, one of the pioneers of the British package holiday industry. The latter were complemented by 'aerial cruises' from Northolt to Las Palmas de Gran Canaria via Lisbon, which launched on 15 June 1947 at a frequency of three return flights per week.

Skyways was one of the major civilian participants in the Berlin Airlift, where up to seven of the company's aircraft — three Yorks and four Lancastrians — were employed between November 1948 and August 1949. The former served on the airlift from 16 November 1948 until 15 August 1949 and the latter from early-January until 17 July 1949. The latter were also fitted with additional fuselage tanks to carry diesel and petrol.

=== 1950 coincides with a big change ===
In 1950, the War Office began awarding trooping flight contracts to Britain's contemporary independent airlines. Skyways was one of the main beneficiaries, (Note: as a result of assuming responsibility for the contract the War Office had awarded Lancashire Aircraft Corporation prior to the LAC-Skyways merger) along with Airwork, Hunting and Eagle. Following the award of the War Office contract, the airline purchased a large fleet of Avro Yorks from BOAC. These operations included frequent flights between the UK and Singapore in co-operation with Airwork.

Other areas of activity in which Skyways engaged during its formative years included a growing number of ad hoc passenger and cargo charter flights carrying car manufacturers' executives and various types of freight.

Some examples of their freight contracts include the transport of three Fordson tractors from Dunsfold to Kuwait, fruit from Italy to UK in Lancastrians, and milk from Northern Ireland to Liverpool in 1947. A service was also established using a Lancastrian to fly twice weekly between Singapore and Hong Kong, taking five and a half hours, against BOAC's two days with an overnight in Bangkok. This led to the creation of Skyways (Far East) Ltd in 1947. Skyways also had ambitions to carry mail between the UK and Hong Kong. The proposed service using a Lancastrian via Karachi would take a day and a half, in competition with BOAC's 8 day service, however, political pressures supporting the nationalised airline prevailed and the service was not started.

The rapid growth in business resulted in a major expansion of the fleet and workforce that saw the acquisition of additional Yorks and Lancastrians as well as several DC-4s (Note: four ex-KLM examples, the first two of which joined the fleet in October 1947) and DC-3s providing employment for more than 1,600 (350 aircrew and 1,300 ground staff). (Note: by May 1947) This made Skyways Europe's biggest contemporary charter airline.

To support its fledgling operation, Skyways established a maintenance base at Dunsfold Aerodrome. The new maintenance division initially traded as Samlesbury Engineering Ltd.

As the late 1940s' boom turned to bust, Skyways began selling aircraft and laying off staff. Management attempted to deal with this situation by putting the airline into voluntary liquidation in March 1950 and transferring the remaining assets to a new company bearing the Skyways name on the last day of that month.

=== Lancashire Aircraft takeover and move to Stansted ===
The new company resumed operations from Dunsfold with a fleet of six DC-3s the following month. It was Skyways of London Ltd. legally established on 31 March. The re-launched company continued to deteriorate and operations ceased again by January 1952, resulting in disposal of remaining aircraft (a pair of DC-3s).

In March 1952, David Brown and Eric Rylands, owners of the Lancashire Aircraft Corporation (LAC), acquired all Skyways ordinary shares together with two non-airworthy aircraft that had formed part of Skyways's fleet (a York and a Lancastrian). This takeover resulted in the combined group's headquarters and main operating base relocating to Bovingdon and the award in June 1952 of a new War Office contract to transport 4,000 troops, their dependents and civilian defence personnel between the UK, Bermuda and Jamaica. Joint trooping flights commenced on 2 July 1952. (Note: entailing twice-monthly joint LAC-Skyways trooping flights from Bovingdon to Bermuda and Jamaica) These used modified Yorks with a new 70,000lb (31,751kg) maximum takeoff weight and 36, rear-facing seats. It took 27 hours to reach the Caribbean from the UK, including two intermediate stops at Keflavík, Iceland, and Gander, Canada, respectively. Service frequency eventually increased to three to four monthly round-trips.

LAC's takeover of Skyways in 1952 resulted in the establishment of Eric Rylands Ltd (Note: Eric Rylands Ltd subsequently acquired ownership of Skyways Coach-Air and the Bibby Line's minority holding in the Skyways group as well) as a new holding company for Skyways and Skyways Engineering (the renamed Samlesbury Engineering). The Skyways takeover furthermore resulted in Skyways Engineering transferring its base to Stansted from Bovingdon, where it had moved temporarily following the Hawker Aircraft company's move to Dunsfold. The large engineering base at Stansted comprised three hangars. This provided the maintenance support for Skyways's new operating base at that airport with sufficient space for the overhaul of the entire LAC fleet, which mainly consisted of Yorks and Lancastrians. Commercial flights from Stansted began in October 1952 with a fleet of Avro Yorks. Following the move to Stansted, in November 1952, Skyways acquired five additional Yorks from Eagle Aviation for £160,000. This acquisition increased the York fleet to 29, making the airline the world's largest operator of the type. It also lent further support to the company's claim to being the largest independent airline operator in Europe. Another consequence of this takeover was LAC's acquisition of approximately 20% of Morton Air Services shares previously held by Skyways.

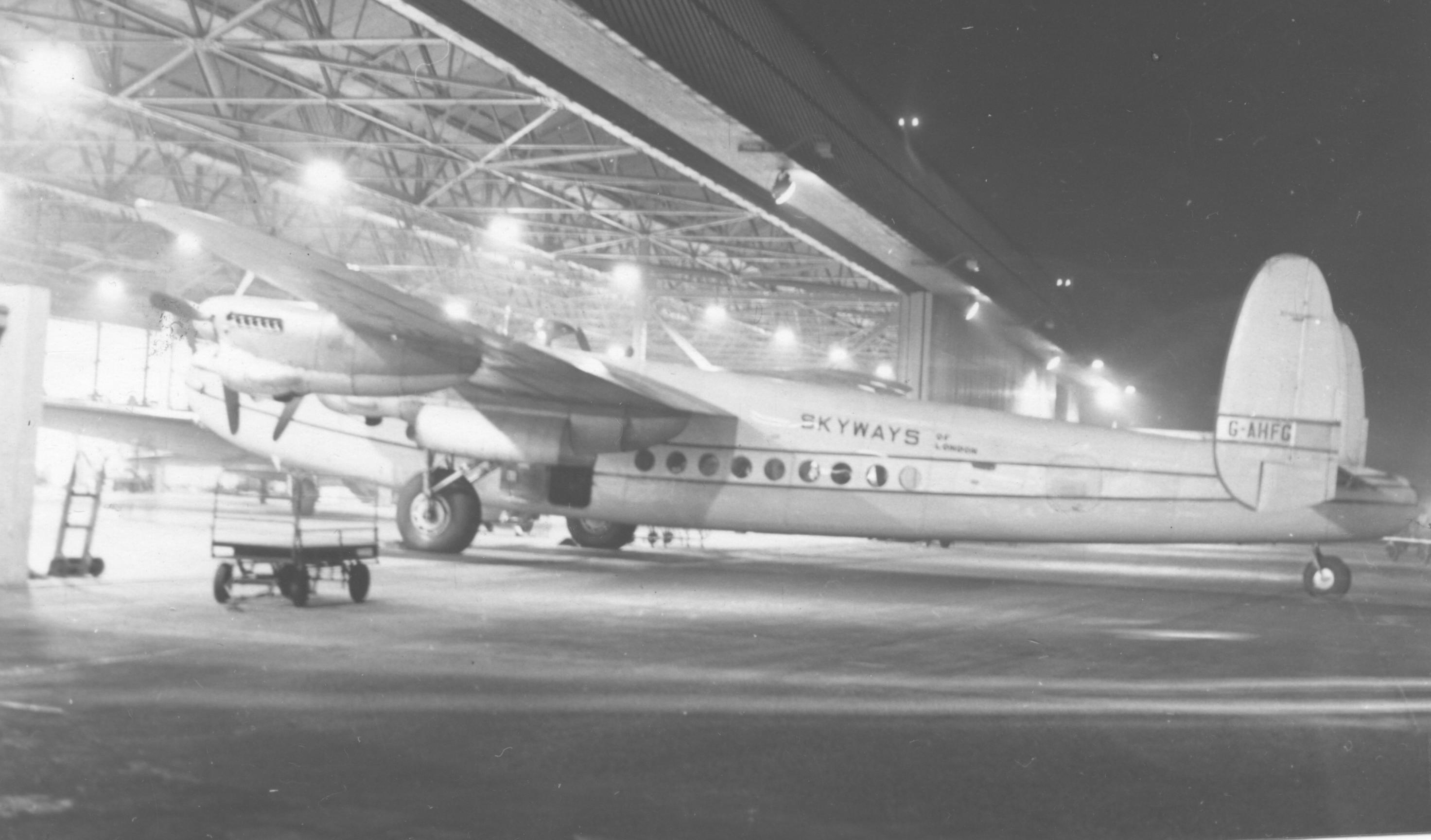
Avro York being serviced at Manchester Airport during a trooping flight to Jamaica in 1952

LAC followed up the takeover of Skyways with an announcement concerning the combined group's new strategy to

- "fly anything anywhere";
- operate all four-engined aircraft under the Skyways of London name;
- maintain Central London head offices in Berkeley Street and overseas presences in Hamburg and Canada.

In its first year of operation at Stansted (October 1952 to October 1953), Skyways's fleet numbered 33 aircraft, making it one of the largest contemporary independent airlines. During that period, the airline's Stansted operation handled 40,000 troops and accounted for 2.9 million revenue miles. The Caribbean contract accounted for just under half of all trooping flights from and to the UK. This was also the time Skyways had been contracted to fly the British, Canadian and US equestrian teams to the Olympic Games in Helsinki.

=== Diversification and reorganisation ===
In November 1953, Skyways commenced its first low-fare scheduled services from Stansted to Nicosia via Malta. These were marketed as Crusader Coach. The 14-hour trip was operated with Yorks departing the Essex airport on alternate Wednesdays and cost £75 return (£33 less than competing air services).

In subsequent years, general passenger and freight charters, IT flights and additional scheduled services were added, including a livestock freight service from Stansted to Beauvais.

In 1954, Skyways acquired ten Handley Page Hermes aircraft from BOAC for use on trooping and general charter work.

In 1955, Skyways launched the world's first Coach-Air service linking London and Paris. In July of that year, the Air Ministry awarded the airline a lucrative, £1.5 million contract to transport 12,000 troops between the UK and Cyprus, which had until then only been an intermediate stop on trooping flights between the UK and the Middle and Far East. These flights utilised the recently acquired Hermes. This was also the year it sold a minority stake to the Bibby Line.

In 1956, pressurised Hermes replaced unpressurised Yorks on Skyways's Crusader Coach services due to the flights' growing popularity. These 68-seat aircraft also enabled Skyways to become a major supplier of whole-plane charter seats to Britain's contemporary tour operators. In December of that year, Skyways's parent company, LAC, changed ownership as a result of being taken over by British Aviation Services (BAS), the owners of rival independent airlines Britavia and Silver City Airways. This resulted in Skyways regaining its independence as its assets (including Skyways Coach-Air routes and Skyways Engineering) were not included in BAS's acquisition of LAC.

In 1957, BOAC awarded Skyways a contract to operate regular freight services on its behalf between Heathrow and Singapore. Yorks initially operated these services. They were subsequently replaced with Hermes. In October 1958, Skyways Coach-Air Limited was established as a separate legal entity, as part of a reorganisation of Skyways's airline operations.

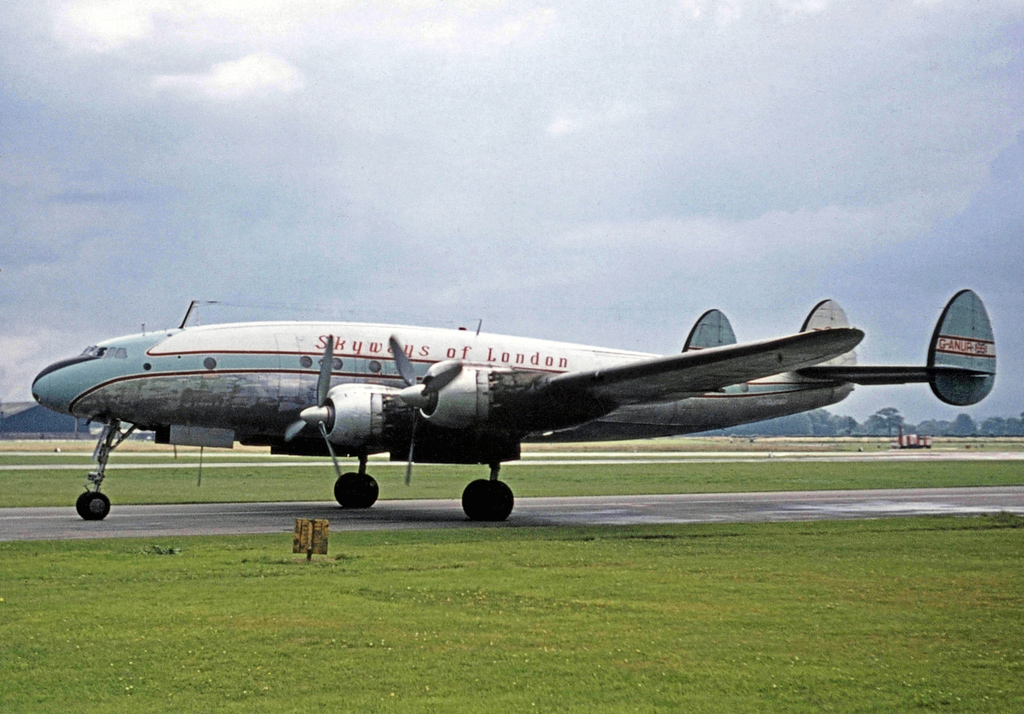
Lockheed Constellation operating an inclusive tour flight at Manchester, 1963

In 1959, Skyways leased four Lockheed Constellation airliners from BOAC. These replaced Hermes on the London—Singapore scheduled freight service Skyways operated on behalf of BOAC. This was the year Skyways embarked upon a major expansion in the Caribbean, following its acquisition of an 80% stake in Bahamas Airways (Note: through Eric Rylands Ltd) from BOAC. Skyways allocated two Hermes aircraft with completely refurbished interiors to its new joint venture, the renamed Skyways (Bahamas) Ltd. However, these did not appeal to the largely US-based clientele of Bahamas Airways, and stiff competition from Pan American World Airways (Pan Am) between Nassau, Fort Lauderdale, Miami and West Palm Beach resulted in few passengers and mounting losses. As this situation had become untenable, Skyways's holding company, Eric Rylands Ltd, decided to sell back to BOAC its shares in Bahamas Airways. That year, Skyways also launched scheduled passenger services between London Heathrow and Tunis, utilising the refurbished Hermes aircraft that had originally been allocated to the unsuccessful joint venture in the Bahamas. This was furthermore the time London's premier airport became the airline's main operating base. (Note: this had resulted in commercial operations being concentrated at Heathrow (with a small amount of revenue services using Gatwick as well) while Stansted continued to be used for maintenance and training) Although the airline's Yorks were by then nearing the end of their service lives, they were still kept busy ferrying spare parts around the world on behalf of BOAC and Pan Am.

=== Financial difficulties and merger with Euravia ===
In 1961, the Bibby Line sold its minority holding in the Skyways group to Eric Rylands Ltd, henceforth the holding company for all Skyways subsidiaries. By that time, most of the Hermes had left the Skyways fleet, and Constellations were exclusively used for all passenger flights, including the weekly scheduled service between Heathrow, Tunis and Malta Skyways operated in association with British European Airways (BEA).

This was also the time when Skyways began experiencing growing financial difficulties as a result of the high cost of the Constellation lease, the failed joint venture in the Bahamas and BOAC's cancellation of its freight contract with Skyways that had generated three quarters of the latter's revenue. This resulted in Skyways' ownership passing in September 1962 to Euravia (London) Ltd, a newly formed British independent airline concentrating on IT and group charter flights from Luton. In October 1962, Euravia (London) took over Skyways for a nominal £1, including four Yorks and three Constellations (Note: acquisition of the ex-Skyways Constellations helped Euravia overcome the capacity shortage it was facing ahead of the 1963 summer charter season) but excluding the Coach-Air operation, which remained a separate entity. Skyways became a wholly owned subsidiary of Euravia in early 1963.

Skyways continued flying as Skyways of London name until April 1964, with the Constellations contracted by Euravia parent Universal Skytours to operate IT flights from several UK airports to European holiday destinations. In that year, Euravia adopted the Britannia Airways name for all operations following its decision to re-equip its entire fleet with Bristol 175 Britannia turboprops.

== Fleet details ==
In late 1955, Skyways fleet comprised 28 aircraft.

Aircraft type	Total
Handley Page Hermes	10
Avro 685 York	15
Douglas DC-3	3
Total	28

=== Fleet in 1958 ===
In April 1958, Skyways fleet comprised 18 aircraft.

Aircraft type	Total
Avro 685 York	14
Douglas DC-3	4
Total	18

=== Fleet in 1962 ===
In April 1962, Skyways fleet comprised 9 aircraft.

Aircraft type	Total
Lockheed L-749A Constellation	4
Handley Page Hermes	1
Avro 685 York	4
Total	9

== Accidents and incidents ==
There are some 16 recorded accidents and incidents during airline's 16-year existence from 1946 until 1962. Five of these involved fatalities.

1. 18 November 1946 - Douglas DC 3 (registered G-AGBE) crashed at Lons-le-Saulnier (France). No fatalities.
2. 8 December 1946 - Avro 651 (registered G-AHCA) destroyed in hangar fire at Dunsfold airport (Surrey). No fatalities.
3. 11 May 1947 - Avro York (registered G-AGLF) crashed while landing at a military base in Syrian desert. No fatalities.
4. 25 July 1947 - Avro York (registered G-AIUP) crashed while landing at London-Heathrow airport. No fatalities.
5. 3 October 1947 - Avro 651 (registered G-AHBU) crashed close to Belfast (N.I.) Nutts Corner airport. No fatalities.
6. 14 May 1948 - DH.104 Dove (registered G-AJOU) broke up in a severe storm during a charter flight from Paris to Cannes and crashed into Mount Coron. Ten on board, including Kick Kennedy, sister of John F. Kennedy, her friend Lord Fitzwilliam, and the crew of two, were killed.
7. 4 February 1949 - Canadair C-54 (registered G-AJPL) crashed near Castel Benito airport (Libya). No fatalities.
8. 16 March 1949 - Avro York (registered G-AHFI) crashed while approaching Gatow airport (Berlin). Crew of 3 lost lives.
9. 10 June 1949 - Avro York (registered G-ALBX) crashed near Neustadt (Germany). No fatalities.
10. 26 June 1949 - Avro Lancastrian (registered G-AKFH) caught fire while landing at Gatow airport (Berlin). No fatalities.
11. 5 March 1951 - DH.89A Dragon Rapide (registered G-AHIA) damaged beyon economical repair at Rhodes Island (Greece). No fatalities.
12. 2 February 1953 - The worst accident involving a Skyways Group aircraft. Avro 685 York 1 (registered G-AHFA to Lancashire Aircraft Corp.) flying from Terceira-Lajes Airport, Azores (Portugal) to Gander Airport, Newfoundland (Canada), a trooping flight with 39 occupants (six crew and 33 passengers) was lost over the Atlantic Ocean without trace.1953 Skyways Avro York disappearance The last radio contact was a distress signal (SOS) received from the aircraft. The aircraft's last position was 46° 15'N 46° 31'W. The wreckage was never found. This crash lost Skyways its trooping contract with the War Office.
13. 26 June 1954 - Avro York (registered G-AGNY) crashed after engine trouble near Kyritz in the Soviet zone, 50 miles northwest of Berlin. The crew of three were killed. There was no cargo on board. The Times newspaper named the three crew as: Capt B S Murphy, First Officer Rube Giles and Radio Operator Z I Patterson
14. 4 March 1956 - Handley Page HP.81 Hermes 4 (registered G-ALDW) was destroyed on the ground at Nicosia Airport as a result of a bomb explosion in the forward baggage hold while the aircraft was awaiting a full load of 68 passengers.
15. 1 April 1958 - Handley Page Hermes (registered G-ALDV) crashed at Meesden Green, shortly after takeoff from Stansted airport, on a routine test flight. The elevators became jammed and the pilots were deprived of control. The crew, Captain Rayment, Captain West and Flight Engineer Norman Bradley were all killed.
16. 8 March 1960 - Handley Page Hermes (registered G-ALDH) udercarriage collapsed at london-Heathrow airport.No fatalities.

== See also ==
- List of defunct airlines of the United Kingdom

== Notes and citations ==
Notes

Citations

== Sources ==
- "Flight International". Flight International. Sutton, UK: Reed Business Information. ISSN 0015-3710. (various backdated issues relating to Skyways Ltd, Skyways Coach-Air, Skyways International 1946-1972 and Skyways Cargo Airline 1975–1980)
- Simons, Graham M. (1993). The Spirit of Dan-Air. Peterborough, UK: GMS Enterprises. ISBN 1-870384-20-2.
- Eglin, Roger & Ritchie, Berry (1980). Fly me, I'm Freddie. London, UK: Weidenfeld and Nicolson. ISBN 0-297-77746-7.
- "Airliner World (Skyways)". Airliner World. Stamford, UK: Key Publishing: 62–69. November 2011. ISSN 1465-6337. (Airliner World online)
