= List of aircraft hijackings =

The following is a list of notable attempted aircraft hijackings.

== 1910s ==
- (Hungary) 1919 (exact date unknown, possibly between March–July): In an incident often cited as the first aircraft hijacking in history—though verified primarily through the protagonist's own memoirs rather than contemporary press records—Hungarian aristocrat and noted paleontologist Baron Franz Nopcsa von Felső-Szilvás requisitioned an aircraft to flee the Hungarian Soviet Republic. Nopcsa, a scholar and former spy during World War I, forged documents from the Ministry of War to convince the military commander at the Mátyásföld Airfield near Budapest to provide him and his Albanian boyfriend, Bajazid Elmaz Doda, with a small airplane and a pilot. Somewhere over Győr, approximately halfway to their supposed destination of Sopron, Franz drew a revolver on the pilot and successfully had the flight redirected to Vienna, Republic of German-Austria.

== 1920s ==
- May 14, 1928: The first hijacking of an airplane in the United States occurred on the afternoon of this day, when a 28-year-old pilot named Harry W. Anderson was brutally attacked with a ball-peen hammer by his sole passenger, 18-year-old Clarence René Frechette. In an apparent suicide attempt, Frechette had arranged for a short flight in Anderson's biplane from Roseville, Michigan to Frechette's hometown of nearby Pontiac. When they were nearing their destination, at an altitude of about 2,000 feet above ground level, Frechette suddenly and viciously attacked the pilot with a hammer he had brought onboard, severely injuring Anderson and rendering him unconscious. The plane entered a spin and a steep dive, drawing the attention of many people on the ground, who mistakenly thought they were watching a stunt pilot perform an aerobatic exhibition. Just before the plane impacted the ground, Anderson regained consciousness and attempted to pull out of the dive, which likely saved the lives of both men. The biplane was destroyed in the crash, which occurred on the grounds of the Pontiac State Hospital, an insane asylum. Anderson was rushed to the hospital with severe injuries, including multiple skull fractures. Police interviewed him as he was wheeled into the operating room because the doctors feared he might not survive. Although it was difficult for Anderson to provide a statement because he had lost most of his teeth, he was able to tell the authorities what had occurred before he passed out. Frechette initially claimed that he had been the one flying the plane, and Anderson was the attacker, but the first rescuers to reach the crash site reported that Anderson's hands were still clutching the controls, and Frechette was holding a broken hammer. Authorities found several strange notes and letters in Frechette's clothes, including a note to his girlfriend that read, "Death is my postage, sweetheart." Frechette suffered only mild injuries in the crash, and after a brief stay in the hospital, he was transferred to the county jail and charged with attempted murder. Several months later, Frechette was found guilty by a jury of "assault with intent to do great bodily harm" and sentenced to six years in state prison, earning the nickname of America's first "air bandit." By the end of 1928, Anderson had made a full recovery from his injuries and returned to work as a flight instructor at Packard Field in Roseville.
- (Mexico) 1929–1930 (unconfirmed): In the Fort Worth Star-Telegram daily newspaper (morning edition) 19 September 1970, J. Howard "Doc" DeCelles stated that he was actually the victim of the first skyjacking in December 1929. He was flying a postal route for the Mexican company Transportes Aereos Transcontinentales, ferrying mail from San Luis Potosí to Torreon and then on to Guadalajara. He was approached by Gen. Saturnino Cedillo, governor of the state of San Luis Potosí and one of the last remaining lieutenants of Pancho Villa. Cedillo was accompanied by several other men. He was told through an interpreter that he had no choice in the matter; he had to fly the group to their chosen destination. He stalled long enough to convey the information to his boss, who told him to cooperate. He had no maps, but was guided by the men as he flew above Mexican mountains. He landed on a road as directed, and was held captive for several hours under armed guard. He eventually was released with a "Buenos" from Cedillo and his staff. DeCelles kept his flight log, according to the article, but he did not file a report with authorities. He went on to work for the FAA in Fort Worth after his flying career.

== 1930s ==
- February 21, 1931: The first documented hijacking of a civilian airliner, for which detailed and reliable records exist, occurred on this date, when a Pan American-Grace Airways airmail flight landed in Arequipa, Peru and was surrounded by armed guerillas as the Ford Trimotor taxied to the terminal. After seizing the plane, the hijackers demanded that the pilot, Captain Byron Dague Rickards, drop propaganda leaflets on Peruvian cities in order to rally support for their efforts to overthrow the provisional presidency of Lt. Col. Luis Miguel Sánchez Cerro in Lima. When Rickards refused, the rebels took him hostage, along with the other two members of his crew: George Hillman, a mechanic, and Bill Grey, a pilot for the Faucett Aviation Company. The three men were held for several days, but news reports at the time indicate they were unharmed and "free to go where they please within the city" until British officials negotiated their release. Captain Rickards was later honored by the United States government for saving the mail aboard his plane. Thirty years later, Rickards would become the first pilot to be hijacked twice, when Continental Airlines Flight 54 was seized on August 3, 1961.
- (Brazil) September 25, 1932: the Panair do Brasil Sikorsky S-38 registration P-BDAD, still bearing the livery of Nyrba do Brasil, was seized in the company's hangar by three men, who took a fourth as hostage. Though none of the men was a pilot, they managed to take off in the plane. However, the aircraft crashed in São João de Meriti, killing the four men. Apparently the hijacking was related to the events of the Constitutionalist Revolution in São Paulo, and it is considered to be the first Brazilian plane hijacking.

== 1940s ==
- July 25, 1947: A domestic Romanian flight from Bucharest to Craiova was hijacked by three army officers seeking political asylum from communist Romania. The airplane landed at Çanakkale in Turkey. During the hijacking, the flight mechanic, Mitrofan Bescioti, was shot by Lieutenant Aurel Dobre.
- (Allied-occupied Germany) April 9, 1948: Twenty Czechs seized a Czech National Airlines commercial plane at gunpoint and flew it to the American occupation zone in Germany in a mid-air revolt to flee the communist regime in Czechoslovakia. Five of the passengers and one of the flight crew chose to be repatriated.
- (Bulgaria) (Turkey) June 30, 1948: A domestic flight from Varna to Sofia was hijacked by anti-communists. The plane landed in Istanbul. The pilot was killed in the struggle.
- (Macau) (Hong Kong) July 16, 1948: Miss Macao, a seaplane, was hijacked in an attempted robbery and then crashed into the Pearl River delta. The crash killed 25 of the 26 passengers and crew. The lead hijacker, Huang Yu was the only survivor.
- (Socialist Federal Republic of Yugoslavia) September 13, 1948: A T.A.E. commercial flight from Athens to Thessaloniki was hijacked by eight young communists who asked the pilots to fly to Yugoslavia. The airplane landed near Skopje and, after the hijackers departed, it returned to Greece. The 1987 film The Noose is based on this story.

== 1950s ==
- March 24, 1950: Three Douglas DC-3s from Czechoslovakia were simultaneously hijacked by former Czech Royal Air Force pilots seeking asylum in the West. Most of the hijackers were the crew of all three aircraft. All three planes landed at the US Air Force base at Erding, West Germany. 26 of 85 passengers stayed in West Germany to escape from the communist regime in Czechoslovakia. This was the first incident of mass hijacking in aviation history.
- January 8, 1954: A man and a woman hijacked Aeroflot Flight 365, a Lisunov Li-2 en route from Tallinn to Leningrad with nine on board, demanding to be flown to Finland. Both hijackers were armed with pistols and the woman was also armed with a knife. Flight engineer Timofey Romashkin attempted to overpower the hijackers, but was shot and died a day later. Other crew members managed to finally subdue the hijackers and the aircraft turned around and returned to Tallinn. The flight engineer was posthumously awarded Hero of the Soviet Union, the pilot was awarded the Order of the Red Banner and the remaining crew the Order of the Red Star.
- (Myanmar) June 5, 1954: A team of KNDO (Karen National Defence Organisation) led by Maj Saw Kyaw Aye hijacked a Dakota DC-3 of Union of Burma Airways flying from Rangoon (Yangon) to the Arakan (Rakhine) State capital, Sittwe. There were 14 passengers and four airline staff on board, including a monk, a woman and military officers. The hijackers' plan was to use the plane to smuggle weapons for the KNDO to fight against the government army. Due to insufficient fuel, the plane could not land at the hijackers' intended location and the smuggling plan was unsuccessful. However, there was a government-owned box of 700,000 kyats (US$333 in May 2025), guarded by a military officer, which the hijackers had not known about when planning the hijacking. The hijackers decided to steal the money, hand over control of the plane and flee.
- (Hungary) July 13, 1956: Seven young Hungarian students, armed with nothing more than plastic wrenches, hijacked a Lisunov Li-2 of Malév Hungarian Airlines out of Budapest and landed it at a NATO Ingolstadt Manching airbase in West Germany to escape from behind the Iron Curtain.
- (Soviet Union) September 5, 1958: Aeroflot Flight 365 en route from Leningrad to Tallinn with 16 on board was hijacked by a passenger, who demanded the pilot speak to a group of "interested passengers" and threatened to kill the crew if his demand was not met. The pilot locked himself in the cockpit and armed himself with a pistol. Both the pilot and the flight engineer fired at the door until the pistol was out of ammunition. The hijacker used homemade explosives which started a fire on board. The aircraft landed in flames at Jõhvi; all on board were able to escape except the hijacker, who died when the aircraft burned out.
- (Brazil) (Argentina) December 2, 1959: the Panair do Brasil Lockheed L-049/149 Constellation, registration PP-PCR, operating flight 246 en route from Rio de Janeiro – Santos Dumont to Belém, with 44 passengers and crew aboard, was seized and hijacked by officers of the Brazilian Air Force and made to land at Aragarças, Goiás. Their intention was to use the aircraft in a bombing of government buildings in Rio de Janeiro, thereby starting a revolt against President Juscelino Kubitschek de Oliveira. The revolt faded after 36 hours and the aircraft was commanded to fly to Buenos Aires where the hijackers requested asylum. There were no casualties.

== 1960s ==
- July 19, 1960: In Australia's first hijacking, a man threatened to blow up Trans Australia Airlines Flight 408, but he was disarmed by a member of the crew and a passenger.
- (Portugal) 1961: Hijackers forced an aircraft to circle Lisbon to drop leaflets against the Estado Novo regime. After that, the six hijackers forced the crew to fly them back to Morocco.
- (United States) May 1, 1961: In the first U.S. airline flight hijacked to Cuba, a National Airlines Convair 440 flight from Marathon, Florida, to Key West was hijacked by a man carrying a knife and a gun who demanded the flight divert to Havana. The aircraft, piloted by Captain Francis X. Riley, was thought to be lost at sea for several hours before authorities learned it had been hijacked.
- July 24, 1961: An Eastern Air Lines airplane, performing Eastern Flight 202, was hijacked during a flight between Miami, Florida, and Dallas, Texas. The plane was flown to Cuba, and all occupants were allowed to return to the United States. Among the passengers were world champion boxer Luis Manuel Rodriguez, along with his training staff.
- (United States) July 31, 1961: The first attempted 'skyjacking' of an airline on American soil. Said to be 'inspired by numerous airliner hijackings from other countries to Cuba', pipeline worker Bruce Britt Sr. boarded and attempted to commandeer a Pacific Air Lines flight at the Chico Municipal Airport, in Chico, California, intending to return to his home in Smackover, Arkansas. The attempt failed, but Britt shot two airline employees, blinding one for life.
- (United States) August 3, 1961: Leon and Cody Bearden hijacked Continental Airlines Flight 54 traveling from Los Angeles to Houston armed with pistols. The Boeing 707 was to be used as a bargaining chip to gain political asylum with Fidel Castro in Cuba. The ordeal ended in El Paso, Texas, during re-fueling when US Border Patrol Agent Leonard Gilman, who had volunteered to be a hostage, subdued Leon Bearden.
- (Argentina) September 28, 1966: Argentine nationalists, styling themselves 'Condors', hijacked a plane and forced the pilot to fly to Stanley, Falkland Islands.
- (Israel) (Algeria) July 23, 1968: To date, the only successful El Al hijacking attempt, as three members of Popular Front for the Liberation of Palestine (PFLP) hijacked El Al Flight 426 from Rome to Tel Aviv. Diverting to Algiers, the negotiations extended over 40 days. Both the hijackers and the hostages went free.
- (France) November 8, 1968: An Olympic Airways flight out of Paris was hijacked by two Italian men, who carried a handgun and a grenade. The hijackers forced the crew to hand out pamphlets to the passengers. The hijackers claimed to be members of the International Command for Greece. The two men later surrendered after directing the plane back to Paris.
- (United States) November 24, 1968: Luis Armando Pena Soltren, Jose Rafael Rios Cruz and Miguel Castro coerced the pilot of Pan Am Flight 281 out of New York's John F. Kennedy Airport to divert from a scheduled route to Puerto Rico to Havana, Cuba. Passengers were evacuated from Cuba by a U.S. State Department aircraft. There were no fatalities.
- February 3, 1969: Eastern Air Lines flight from Newark to Miami was hijacked by two Cuban nationals who diverted it to Havana, Cuba. The plane landed safely in Havana and the passengers were allowed to return to the United States unharmed.
- (Syria) August 29, 1969: TWA Flight 840 was a Trans World Airlines flight from Leonardo da Vinci International Airport in Rome, Italy, to Ben Gurion International Airport in Tel Aviv, Israel, that was hijacked on 29 August 1969 by members of the Popular Front for the Liberation of Palestine (PFLP). There were no fatalities, although the aircraft was significantly damaged, and two hostages were held for two months.
- (Brazil) October 8, 1969: a Cruzeiro do Sul Sud Aviation SE-210 Caravelle VI R en route from Belém-Val de Cães to Manaus-Ponta Pelada was hijacked by four people who demanded to be flown to Cuba. The hijack lasted less than a day and there were no casualties.
- (United States) (Republic of Ireland) October 31, 1969: TWA Flight 85 en route from Los Angeles to San Francisco was hijacked by 19-year-old US Marine Raffaele Minichiello. All passengers, including the band Harper's Bizarre and three flight attendants, were released in Denver. The hijacker, three pilots and a flight attendant continued on to JFK airport in New York, where two pilots were added for the overseas flight. The plane refueled in Bangor, Maine and Shannon, Ireland, before continuing to Rome, Italy. In Rome, Minichiello took the chief of the airport police as a hostage and departed in a car, from which he slipped away, but was caught shortly thereafter. Minichiello intended to visit his dying father in Italy. Italy did not extradite Minichiello and he served only 18 months in jail. Covering 6,900 miles, this was the longest (by distance) hijacking in history. A provisional film deal about the escapade has been signed.
- (United States) November 10, 1969: The youngest American on record to attempt to hijack a plane when a Delta Air Lines flight en route from Cincinnati to Chicago was hijacked by 14-year-old David Booth. US Attorney George Kline of Lexington, Kentucky declined to prosecute Booth saying that the federal government did not have facilities to handle prosecution of juveniles.
- (Brazil) November 12, 1969: a Cruzeiro do Sul NAMC YS-11/11A en route from Manaus-Ponta Pelada to Belém-Val de Cães was hijacked by a person who demanded to be flown to Cuba. There were no casualties.
- December 11, 1969: a Korean Air Lines YS-11 en route from Gangneung to Seoul-Gimpo was hijacked by a North Korean agent and flown to North Korea. All four crew members and seven of the 46 other passengers (excluding the agent) were held hostage by North Korea; 39 returned to South Korea, with two crew and two passengers remaining in North Korea.

== 1970s ==
- (Brazil) (Uruguay) (Argentina) (Chile) (Peru) January 1, 1970: a Cruzeiro do Sul Flight 114 en route from Montevideo to Rio de Janeiro, with 33 occupants aboard, was hijacked by six people who demanded to be flown to Cuba. The flight was diverted to Buenos Aires, Antofagasta, Lima, Panama City and arrived in Havana two days later. There were no casualties.
- (United States) March 17, 1970: Eastern Air Lines Shuttle Flight 1320, carrying passengers from Newark to Boston, was hijacked around 7:30 P.M. by John J. Divivo, armed with a .38 caliber revolver. Captain Robert Wilbur Jr., 35, a former Air Force pilot who had been promoted to captain only six months prior, was shot in the arm, and First Officer James Hartley, 31, was mortally wounded by Divivo. However, Wilbur and Hartley were able to subdue the hijacker, and Wilbur successfully landed the plane at Logan Airport. On November 1, 1970, Divivo hanged himself while awaiting trial at Charles Street Jail.
- (South Korea) (North Korea) March 31, 1970: Japan Airlines Flight 351, carrying 131 passengers and seven crew from Tokyo to Fukuoka, was hijacked by Japanese-born North Korean members of the Japanese Red Army Faction (RAF). 23 passengers were freed at Fukuoka Airport, mainly children and the elderly. 108 passengers and all crew members, along with the hijackers, left Fukuoka, bound for Gimpo Airport, near Seoul. Three days later, the RAF members asked to be flown to North Korean capital Pyongyang, before leaving from Seoul, 103 passenger and crew hostages were freed, and the hijackers surrendered to North Korean authorities.
- (Brazil) July 1, 1970: a Cruzeiro do Sul Sud Aviation SE-210 Caravelle VI R registration PP-PDX en route from Rio de Janeiro to São Paulo with 31 occupants was hijacked by four people who demanded the release of political prisoners that were to be taken to Cuba. The aircraft was stormed and the hijackers were arrested. There were no casualties and the hijack lasted less than a day.
- (Brazil) (France) (Guyana) (Antigua and Barbuda) July 4, 1970: a Cruzeiro do Sul NAMC YS-11 en route from Belém-Val de Cães to Macapá was hijacked by one person and flown to Cayenne, Georgetown, Trinidad and Tobago, Antigua and Jamaica.
- (Egypt) July 22, 1970: Olympic Airways Flight 255 six PFLP hijacked a Boeing 727 out of Athens, Greece to Beirut, Lebanon. Greek authorities complied with the hijackers' demands and released seven Palestinians who had been detained in connection with previous attacks.
- (United States) August 2, 1970: Pan American World Airways Flight 299 from New York to San Juan was hijacked to Havana with 379 people aboard. This was the first hijacking of a Boeing 747 and the first Boeing 747 to land in Cuba. This same aircraft was involved in the Tenerife Airport Disaster in 1977. The captain of the flight was met by Cuban Premier Fidel Castro.
- (West Germany) (Switzerland) September 6, 1970: As part of the Dawson's Field hijackings by Popular Front for the Liberation of Palestine members, the TWA Flight 741 from Frankfurt (a Boeing 707) and Swissair Flight 100 from Zürich (a Douglas DC-8) were forced to land at Dawsons Field.
- (Israel) (Netherlands) (Palestine) September 6, 1970: As part of the Dawson's Field hijackings by PFLP members, the hijacking of El Al Flight 219 from Amsterdam (a Boeing 707) was foiled: hijacker Patrick Argüello was shot and killed, and his partner Leila Khaled was subdued and turned over to British authorities in London.
- (Palestine) September 6, 1970: As part of the Dawson's Field hijackings by PFLP members, two PFLP hijackers who were prevented from boarding the El Al flight, hijacked instead Pan Am Flight 93, a Boeing 747, diverting the large plane first to Beirut and then to Cairo, rather than to the small Jordanian airstrip.
- (Palestine) September 9, 1970: As part of the Dawson's Field hijackings by PFLP members, BOAC Flight 775, a Vickers VC10 coming from Bahrain, was hijacked by a PFLP sympathizer and brought to Dawson's Field in order to pressure the British to free Leila Khaled.
- (Soviet Union) October 15, 1970: Aeroflot Flight 244 was hijacked from Batumi, Adjar ASSR, Georgian SSR, to Trabzon, Turkey by a Lithuanian national and his son. A female flight attendant was killed and several other crew members were injured in a shoot-out.
- (United States) June 4, 1971—Glen Elmo Riggs, 58 years old, a retired coal miner from Ashford, West Virginia, hijacked a United Airlines 737 jet and demanded to be flown to Israel. He was captured at Dulles International Airport when the flight engineer, acting on the advice of a psychiatrist in the control tower, talked the hijacker into giving up his pistol.
- January 23, 1971: Korean Air Lines Fokker F27 hijacking, Korean Air Fokker F27 on scheduled Sokcho—Seoul flight in South Korea was hijacked by a man with hand grenades demanding to be taken to North Korea. Several hand grenades exploded and the aircraft crashed on a beach in South Korea leading to a total hull loss. Two people died in the incident, the hijacker and the first officer, and several passengers were injured by explosions during the incident.
- January 30, 1971: Indian Airlines hijacking, Indian Airlines Fokker F27 on scheduled Srinagar-Jammu flight, was hijacked to Lahore by two self-proclaimed Kashmir Separatists. All passengers were released by February 2 and repatriated to India, but the aircraft was blown up, leading to an India-Pakistan air-travel ban, and suspension of overflight rights until 1976.
- (China) March 30, 1971: Philippine Airlines flight was hijacked in March 1971 by six students from the Mindanao State University, opposed to the government of Ferdinand Marcos. The plane landed in Guangzhou, Guangdong, and the Chinese authorities let the students stay in the country. The plane was then allowed to fly back to the Philippines. No one was hurt.
- May 17, 1971: an IL-14 with four staff members and 16 passengers was hijacked by six men at the Oradea Airport, Romania, then forced to fly to Budapest, Hungary then Vienna, Austria. The passengers and the crew were released in Vienna, while the hijackers flew to West Germany.
- (United States) July 2, 1971: Braniff Flight 14, a Boeing 707 flying from Acapulco to New York with 102 passengers and a crew of eight, was hijacked on approach to a refueling stop in San Antonio, Texas. The ordeal lasted 43 hours across Texas, Mexico, Peru, Brazil and finally Argentina. After a refueling stop in Monterrey, the hijackers released three flight attendants and all of the passengers. The remaining crew flew on to Lima. The hijackers, a U.S. Navy deserter named Robert Jackson and his Guatemalan girlfriend, demanded and got a ransom of $100,000 (about USD$800,000 in 2026) and wanted to go to Algeria. The original crew was released, one by one, and replaced by a volunteer crew. The hijackers surrendered themselves in Buenos Aires.
- August 20, 1971: A Pakistan Air Force T-33 trainer was hijacked during the Bangladesh Liberation War in Karachi when a Bengali instructor pilot, Flight Lieutenant Matiur Rahman, knocked out Pilot Officer Rashid Minhas with the intention to join Mukti Bahini. On regaining consciousness in mid-flight, Minhas struggled for flight control as well as relaying the news of his hijack to the PAF base. At the end of the ensuing struggle he succeeded in crashing his aircraft into the ground near Thatta. He was posthumously awarded Pakistan's highest military award Nishan-e-Haider (Sign of the Lion) for his act of bravery. For his attempt to defect from the Pakistan Air Force to join the Bangladesh Liberation War, Matiur Rahman was decorated with the Bir Sreshtho award by Bangladesh which is their highest honor.
- (United States) November 8, 1971: Charles Hill, Ralph Lawrence, and Albert Finney were driving a carload of weapons to Louisiana as part of the Republic of New Afrika militant group. They murdered New Mexico State Police officer Robert Rosenbloom during a traffic stop and escaped to Albuquerque where they hijacked a TWA 727 to Cuba.
- (United States) November 12, 1971: Air Canada Flight 812, a commercial DC-8 aircraft en route from Vancouver to Montreal, was hijacked as it approached Regina, Saskatchewan. The hijacker, Paul Joseph Cini, was armed with a shotgun and two bundles of dynamite. He then held the plane hostage for a ransom of CAN $1 million and forced the crew to land in Great Falls, Montana. Flight attendant Mary Dohey, who had been attempting to reason with Cini for the duration of the flight, managed to persuade him to release the flight's 118 passengers and some crew members. Shortly after, the remaining crew on board managed to overpower the hijacker, ending the 8-hour ordeal. For her actions during the hijacking, Dohey was presented with the Cross of Valour, Canada's highest civilian decoration for bravery. She was the first living person to receive the honour.
- (United States) November 24, 1971: A man who became known as D. B. Cooper hijacked Northwest Orient Airlines Flight 305, a Boeing 727-100 aircraft flying from Portland, Oregon, to Seattle, Washington, received US$200,000 in ransom, and parachuted from the plane. The actual name of the hijacker remains unknown. The hijacker revealed what appeared to be a bomb to a flight attendant and demanded the ransom and parachutes. The flight landed in Seattle, and FBI agents provided the ransom money and parachutes. Cooper then released all passengers and two flight attendants. After refueling, the aircraft took off again and flew toward Reno, Nevada. Cooper opened the aft stairs and jumped from the plane with a parachute during a heavy rainstorm. The aircraft was forced to land with the aft stairs deployed. The FBI believes Cooper most likely did not survive, but the case remains unsolved.
- (Bangladesh) December 3, 1971: French activist Jean Kay commandeered a Pakistan International Airlines Boeing 720 with 28 passengers on board as it taxied at Orly Airport outside Paris, France, for a flight to Karachi, Pakistan, demanding emergency supplies for East Pakistan. Security forces subdued the hijacker after a 7-hour standoff.
- (Canada) December 26, 1971: Patrick Critton hijacked an airplane from Thunder Bay, Ontario to Cuba. He was convicted in 2001.
- (United States) January 12, 1972: Braniff Flight 38, a Boeing 727, was hijacked by a lone gunman, Billy Gene Hurst Jr., as it departed Houston, Texas bound for Dallas, Texas. Hurst allowed the other 94 passengers to deplane after landing at Dallas Love Field but continued to hold the seven crewmembers hostage, demanding to fly to South America and asking for US$2 million, parachutes, and jungle survival gear, amongst other items. After a 6-hour standoff, a package containing some of the items was delivered by Dallas police, and the hostages escaped while Hurst was examining it. Police stormed the jetliner shortly afterwards and arrested Hurst without serious incident.
- (United States) January 28, 1972: TWA Flight 2, Los Angeles to New York, was hijacked by con man and bank robber Garrett Trapnell while over Chicago. Trapnell demanded $306,800 in cash (to recoup the loss of a recent court case), the release of Angela Davis (as well as that of a friend of his who was also imprisoned), and clemency from President Richard Nixon. The FBI retook the aircraft during a crew switch at Kennedy Airport; Trapnell was shot and wounded, but nobody else was hurt. Trapnell's hijacking came after a string of domestic incidents and resulted in an overhaul of flight procedures by the Nixon Administration, procedures that remained in place until the hijackings on September 11, 2001. Trapnell and unrelated hijacker Martin J. McNally (see June 23, 1972, below) attempted to escape Marion federal prison on May 24, 1978, after Trapnell's girlfriend Barbara Ann Oswald hijacked a helicopter and ordered it to Marion but that hijacking ended when the pilot grabbed Oswald's gun and killed her. On December 21, 1978, Oswald's 17-year-old daughter Robin Oswald hijacked TWA Flight 541 in another attempt to rescue Trapnell. She surrendered after 10 hours of negotiations at the airport in Marion.
- (West Germany) (Japan) (South Yemen) February 22, 1972: Lufthansa Flight 649, a Boeing 747-200 from Tokyo to Frankfurt, was hijacked by a group commandeered by the Popular Front for the Liberation of Palestine (PFLP) during the Delhi-Athens leg and forced to divert to Aden, where all 182 passengers and crew were released the next day in exchange for a $5 million ransom.
- (Indonesia) April 5, 1972 : Merpati Nusantara Airlines Flight 171, a PK-MVM Vickers Viscount aircraft which was serving the Manado-Makassar-Surabaya-Jakarta flight route, was hijacked by one of its passengers and forced to land at Yogyakarta's Adisucipto Airport.
- (United States) April 7, 1972: United Airlines Flight 855, from Newark, New Jersey, to Los Angeles, California, carrying 85 passengers and a crew of six, was hijacked by Richard McCoy Jr. during a stopover in Denver, Colorado. This was a copycat hijacking, modelled on the D.B Cooper 1971 hijacking of Northwest Orient Airlines Flight 305, less than 5 months prior. The aircraft was a Boeing 727 with aft stairs (the same equipment used in the D. B. Cooper incident), via which McCoy escaped in mid-flight by parachute after giving the crew similar instructions to what Cooper had done. McCoy obtained a $500,000 cash ransom, but following fingerprint and handwriting matches, he was arrested two days after the hijacking, convicted and sentenced to jail.
- (United States) May 5, 1972: Frederick Hahneman hijacked Eastern Air Lines Flight 175 en route from Allentown, Pennsylvania, to Miami, Florida. After receiving $303,000, six parachutes and two cartons of cigarettes he ordered the pilot to fly to Honduras, his birth country, where he parachuted over the jungle and disappeared. A manhunt by the FBI and Honduran police, plus a $25,000 bounty from the airline eventually led to his surrender.
- (Austria) May 8, 1972: Sabena Flight 571 was a passenger flight from Brussels to Tel Aviv via Vienna that was hijacked by four members of the Black September Organization. The hijackers demanded that Israel release Palestinian prisoners in exchange for the hostages. The standoff was ended by an Israeli commando raid in which all of the hijackers were killed or captured. Future prime minister Benjamin Netanyahu was wounded during the rescue operation.
- (South Africa) May 24, 1972: A South African Airways Boeing 727 was hijacked between Salisbury, Rhodesia and Johannesburg and flown to Blantyre in Malawi. After all the crew and passengers escaped, the Malawian security forces started shooting at the aircraft with the two hijackers still on board. The hijackers surrendered.
- (United States) June 3, 1972: Western Airlines Flight 701 from Los Angeles to Seattle was hijacked by Willie Roger Holder, Vietnam veteran, and Catherine Marie Kerkow, his girlfriend. The hijackers claimed they had a bomb in an attaché case and demanded $500,000. After allowing all 97 passengers to get off in San Francisco, they flew to Algeria where they were granted political asylum. The Algerian government confiscated and returned $488,000 of the ransom money to US officials.
- (United States) June 23, 1972: In the ninth copycat D.B. Cooper-style hijacking Martin J. McNally, under the pseudonym of Robert W. Wilson, hijacked American Airlines Flight 119, a Boeing 727 bound from St. Louis to Tulsa and demanded $502,500. The plane flew back and forth between Tulsa and St. Louis while the money was raised. In St. Louis, live news reports about the hijacking prompted David J. Hanley, a 30-year-old businessman, to crash his 1972 Cadillac at 80 mph through two airport fences, travel down the runway at high speed and crash into the nose gear of the plane, which was beginning to taxi. The wrecked car lodged under the fuselage and one wing. Hanley suffered multiple injuries and was charged with wilfully damaging a civil aircraft. The hijacker transferred to a new 727 and jumped out of the plane over Indiana. The full loot bag and gun were discovered by searchers near Peru, Indiana. Fingerprints led to McNally. While in Marion Federal Prison McNally and fellow inmate and hijacker Garrett Trapnell (see January 28, 1972 above) were involved in an attempted prison escape on May 24, 1978, after Trapnell's girlfriend hijacked a helicopter. The escape attempt ended when the helicopter pilot grabbed the woman's gun and killed her. McNally was paroled from prison on January 27, 2010.
- July 2, 1972: Pan Am Flight 841 was a commercial passenger flight of a Boeing 747 from San Francisco, California to Saigon, South Vietnam which was hijacked over the South China Sea on 2 July 1972, ostensibly as an act of protest concerning US involvement in the Vietnam War as well as the expulsion from the United States of the South Vietnamese hijacker, a recent graduate of a US university. The hijacking ended when the captain and passengers overcame and killed the lone hijacker after the plane landed in Saigon.
- July 5, 1972: Pacific Southwest Airlines Flight 710 was hijacked by two Bulgarian immigrants shortly after take-off from Sacramento, California en route to San Francisco. The hijackers demanded $800,000, two parachutes and to be flown to the Soviet Union. The hijacking ended on the runway in San Francisco when agents from the Federal Bureau of Investigation stormed the plane killing both hijackers and one passenger. Two other passengers were wounded. These were the first passengers killed and wounded in a skyjacking in the United States.
- (United States) July 31, 1972: Delta Air Lines Flight 841 was hijacked by five members of the Black Liberation Army, including George Wright. The flight was originally from Detroit to Miami. The hijackers exchanged the passengers for $1 million in Miami and forced the plane to fly to Boston, then to Algeria, which returned the plane and cash but released the hijackers.
- September 15, 1972: Scandinavian Airlines System Flight 130, a DC 9 – Gunder Viking – with registration number LN-RLO en route from Torslanda, Gothenburg, Sweden, to Stockholm, Sweden, was hijacked five minutes after take-off by three armed Croatians connected to Ustasa. The plane was ordered to land at Bulltofta airport, Malmö, Sweden. 86 passengers and four crew members were held hostage until the next morning, when the hostages were released in exchange for 500,000 Swedish Kronor and seven Croatians imprisoned in Sweden. The last passenger left the plane unharmed after 16 hours. The plane and crew were then ordered to fly to Madrid, Spain, where the hijackers later were put on trial.
- (West Germany) (Lebanon) (Socialist Federal Republic of Yugoslavia) October 29, 1972: Lufthansa Flight 615, a Boeing 727, from Beirut to Frankfurt, piloted by Captain Walter Claussen, was hijacked by three men and flown to Zagreb, asking for the liberation of the three surviving perpetrators of the Munich Massacre on 5 September that year. After boarding the three liberated men, the plane was redirected to Tripoli, Libya where all hostages were finally released.
- (Canada) November 10, 1972: Southern Airways Flight 49, was hijacked by three men and flown to a succession of locations in the United States, and one Canadian city. At one point, the hijackers threatened to fly the plane into the nuclear reactor at the Oak Ridge National Laboratory, if their demands for $10 million in cash were not met. While stopped for refueling at McCoy Air Force Base, Orlando, the FBI shot out the plane's tires, prompting the hijackers to force pilot William Haas to take off. The hijacking came to an end when the plane landed on a partially foam-covered runway in Havana, Cuba, and the hijackers were captured.
- (Canada) December 14, 1972: Quebecair Flight 321 en route to Toronto was hijacked by Larry Maxwell Stanford and diverted to Montreal where the hijacker surrendered.
- (Soviet Union) April 24, 1973: An Aeroflot Tu-104 flying from Leningrad to Moscow was hijacked by a man with a bomb. When a flight attendant tried to disarm the hijacker, the bomb detonated, killing both and causing decompression. The crew made an emergency landing in Leningrad; the plane was written off.
- (Soviet Union) May 18, 1973: Another hijacking attempt of Aeroflot Flight 109 flying from Irkutsk to Chita. The hijacker demanded the plane be diverted to China. The bomb detonated and the plane crashed near Lake Baikal, killing all 82 people on board.
- (Netherlands Antilles) May 18, 1973: A domestic flight of a two-engine Convair aircraft with 32 passengers to Caracas, Venezuela was hijacked between Valera and Barquisimeto. The three male and one female hijackers were linked to the leftist group Punto Cero and demanded the release of 79 political prisoners from Venezuelan prisons. Diverting the plane via Curacao in the Dutch Antilles and Panama, where three passengers were released, to Mérida, Yucatán and Mexico City, mediation by a Mexican official resulted in the continuation of the voyage back to Mérida. The aircraft continued to Havana, Cuba, where the hijackers and the Mexican negotiator left the aircraft. The aircraft then returned to Maiquetía, Venezuela with the remaining passengers.
- May 30, 1973: A Colombian airline SAM Colombia HK-1274 with 84 passengers was hijacked between Pereira and Medellín. The two male hijackers, wearing a balaclava and carrying guns, demanded $200,000 and the liberation of political prisoners convicted in El Socorro, Colombia. They diverted the plane to Aruba, Ecuador, Peru and Argentina. Hijackers released all passengers at different stops. Finally the plane landed in Buenos Aires without the hijackers, who previously escaped from the plane. The hijackers were two former Paraguayan football players who disguised themselves as guerrillas in order to get the ransom and had no political affiliation. The hijack lasted for more than 60 hours and was one of the lengthiest airline hijackings at the time (in time) and the longest in distance (22,750 km).
- June 10, 1973: Three men hijacked a Royal Nepal Airlines DHC-6 Twin Otter carrying Indian Rupees, with the intention of stealing the money to fund an armed revolution against the government of Nepal. The hijackers forced the plane to land and removed the cash, then allowed the plane to continue on.
- July 20, 1973: The hijack of Japan Airlines Flight 404 was organised by Wadie Haddad, leader of the Popular Front for the Liberation of Palestine - External Operations, and carried out by four Palestinians and a member of the Japanese Red Army. The plane was hijacked shortly after taking off from Schiphol Airport and forced to land in Libya.
- (France) October 18, 1973: Danielle Cravenne, the second wife of French film producer Georges Cravenne, was shot dead by a police sniper at Marignane airport. Danielle, who was mentally unstable, had tried to hijack 1973 Paris-Nice flight to protest against the release of the film The Mad Adventures of Rabbi Jacob which was being promoted by Georges Cravenne and which she considered "anti-Palestinian", especially in the midst of the Yom Kippur War.
- (Republic of Ireland) October 31, 1973: The Mountjoy Prison helicopter escape, in which three members of the Provisional Irish Republican Army (IRA) were allowed to escape from Mountjoy Prison in Dublin, Ireland aboard a hijacked light helicopter; prison guards initially presumed the vehicle was carrying government officials.
- (Netherlands) (United Arab Emirates) November 25, 1973: A KLM Boeing 747, Mississippi, was hijacked by three young Arabs over Iraqi airspace on a scheduled Amsterdam-Tokyo flight with 247 passengers on board. After the hijackers threatened to blow up the plane when no country would grant landing permission, the plane landed in Malta. Most of the passengers and the eight flight attendants were released after negotiations with the Maltese PM Dom Mintoff who argued with the hijackers that the plane could not possibly take off with both the passengers and the 27,000 gallons of fuel they had demanded given the (then) short runway. With 11 passengers on board the jumbo jet left Malta and flew to Dubai, where the incident ended without fatalities.
- December 17, 1973: Shortly before takeoff, the airport terminal and Pan Am Flight 110 from Rome, Italy to Tehran, Iran were attacked. The aircraft was set on fire by armed Palestinian gunmen, resulting in the deaths of 30 people on the plane and two in the terminal. Following the Flight 110 attack, the gunmen hijacked Lufthansa Flight 303 and killed two more people. After stops in Athens, Greece and Damascus, Syria, they landed in Kuwait. The terrorists negotiated their escape, but they were still captured shortly thereafter.
- (United States) February 22, 1974: At Baltimore/Washington International Airport Samuel Byck shot and killed Maryland Aviation Administration Police Officer George Neal Ramsburg before storming Delta Air Lines Flight 523 to Atlanta. When informed by pilots Reese (Doug) Loftin and Fred Jones they could not take off until wheel blocks were removed, he shot them both and grabbed a nearby passenger, ordering her to "fly the plane." Jones died as he was being removed from the aircraft after the event was concluded; Byck was mortally wounded when Charles Troyer, an Anne Arundel County police officer on the jetway, stormed the plane and fired four shots through the aircraft door at Byck with a .357 Magnum revolver taken from the deceased Ramsburg. Two of the shots penetrated the thick window of the aircraft door and wounded Byck. Before the police could gain entry to the aircraft, Byck committed suicide by shooting himself in the head. Byck's motive was to hijack the aircraft and crash it into the White House, in an assassination attempt on President Richard Nixon.
- (Italy) 25 December 1974: Air India Flight 105, a Boeing 747-237B (registered VT-EBE), flying from Santacruz airport, Bombay to New York JFK, with stops at Beirut, Rome, and Paris was hijacked by a 31-year-old male passenger, while flying on the Beirut-Rome leg. The crew was able to subdue the hijacker, who was handed over to the Italian police officers after landing.
- (Portugal) September 4, 1975: A group of 44 civilians, including armed supporters of the Timorese Democratic Union (UDT), commandeered a Royal Australian Air Force (RAAF) Caribou, A4-140, on the ground at Baucau Airport in the then Portuguese Timor, which was in the middle of a civil war. The Caribou had landed at Baucau on a humanitarian mission for the International Committee of the Red Cross. The civilians demanded that the RAAF crew members fly them to Darwin Airport (also RAAF Base Darwin) in Australia, which they did. After the Caribou arrived there, the Australian government detained the civilians for a short period, and then granted refugee visas to all of them. The Guardian later described A4-140 as "the only RAAF plane ever hijacked", and the incident as "one of the more remarkable stories in Australia's military and immigration history."
- (Argentina) October 5, 1975: Aerolíneas Argentinas Flight 706 was hijacked by a Montoneros platoon as part of Operation Primicia. The plane was diverted to Formosa airport, where all of its passengers and crew were released and the hijackers took off with a few FN FAL rifles they had taken during a simultaneous assault on an Argentine Army base. The aircraft landed in a crop field near Rafaela, Santa Fe province and the guerrillas made a hasty retreat in cars that had been waiting at the improvised airstrip.
- (Israel) June 27, 1976: The hijack of Air France Flight 139 on June 27, 1976, by members of the militant organizations Revolutionary Cells and the Popular Front for the Liberation of Palestine – External Operations was brought to an end on July 4 at Entebbe Airport, Uganda by Operation Entebbe: Israeli commandos assaulted the building holding the hijackers and hostages, killing all Palestinian hijackers and rescuing 105 persons, almost all Israeli and Jewish hostages. However, three passengers and one commando were killed.
- (Egypt) August 23, 1976: EgyptAir Flight 321 was hijacked by three members of the Abd Al-Nassir Movement shortly after takeoff out of Cairo International Airport. The hijackers attempted to divert the flight to Tripoli, Libya, but allowed the aircraft to land at Luxor after the pilots persuaded them that they need to refuel. After landing at Luxor, Egyptian forces stormed the aircraft, capturing all three hijackers; all 101 other persons aboard were unharmed. The hijackers later claimed they had been directed by Muammar Gaddafi, and had already been paid a fifth of their $250,000 reward.
- (United States) September 10, 1976: TWA Flight 355 was hijacked by Croatian separatists. Some passengers were allowed to deplane in Canada before the hijackers continued on to Iceland, then France, where they released the remaining passengers and surrendered to authorities. One New York police officer was killed while working on a bomb which the hijackers had planted at Grand Central Station.
- September 10, 1976: Indian Airlines plane Boeing 737 was hijacked from Palam Airport Delhi by a group of six militants from Jammu and Kashmir: Syed Abdul Hameed Dewani, Syed M Rafique, M Ahsan Rathore, Abdul Rashid Malik, Ghulam Rasool and Khawaja Ghulam Nabi Itoo. They landed at CAA Lahore Airport in Pakistan to land and refuel. All six hijackers were taken into custody and the plane was sent back to India with 83 passengers on board. The militants were later released in Pakistan citing "lack of evidence".
- (United States) (Japan) May 8, 1977: Northwest Orient Airlines Flight 22, a Boeing 747 en route from Tokyo to Honolulu, was hijacked about an hour after takeoff by a passenger who held a razor to a flight attendant's throat and demanded to be flown to Moscow. The flight's purser subdued the hijacker with a fire ax. The flight returned to Tokyo so the hijacker's injuries could be treated; no other injuries were reported.
- July 10, 1977: Two gunmen hijacked a domestic Soviet flight with the intention of flying to Sweden, but were forced to land in Finland due to lack of fuel. They eventually surrendered and were extradited back to the Soviet Union.
- September 28, 1977: Japan Airlines Flight 472 was hijacked by the Japanese Red Army (JRA). The JRA hijacked the plane over India and forced it to land in Dhaka, Bangladesh. The Japanese government freed six imprisoned members of the group and allegedly paid a $6M ransom.
- September 5, 1977: a McDonnell Douglas DC-9 Garuda Indonesia Flight 488 which was serving the Jakarta-Surabaya flight route was hijacked by a passenger named Triyudo, an honorary civilian employee of the Indonesian Air Force. The hijacker used a badik to take a flight attendant hostage, but was subdued by a passenger.
- (Spain) (Palestine) October 13, 1977: Lufthansa Flight 181 (also known as the Landshut) was hijacked by Palestinian hijackers on a flight from Palma de Mallorca to Frankfurt. The ordeal ended in Mogadishu, Somalia when GSG 9 commandos stormed the plane. Three hijackers were killed and 86 hostages were freed. The pilot was killed before the raid. The hand of West Germany's Red Army Faction was suspected.
- 28 October 1977: A Vietnam Civil Aviation Douglas DC-3, registration VN-C509, was hijacked by four armed Vietnamese hijackers seeking asylum in Singapore, en route from Ho Chi Minh City to Phu Quoc Island with 32 passengers on board. Two of the six crew members were killed and a third was wounded before the aircraft was forced to land in Singapore. The hijackers surrendered after negotiating with Singapore officials for five hours.
- (Malaysia) (Japan) December 4, 1977: A suspected member of Japanese Red Army hijacked Malaysian Airline System Flight 653. The Boeing 737 then crashed after he shot both pilots and himself. All 100 people on board died.
- (United States) March 13, 1978: United Flight 696 was hijacked by Clay Thomas immediately after takeoff out of San Francisco International Airport. The aircraft landed in Oakland and the release of cabin crew and passengers was negotiated by the flight crew. The fueling was cut short by the hijacker and flight 696 took off only partially refueled. Flight 696 landed in Denver to take on more fuel for Cuba. While waiting for the fuel, the crew jumped from the cockpit to escape the hijacker. The hijacker surrendered to the FBI within minutes of the crew's escape. There were no fatalities, but the three cockpit crew-members suffered injuries from the two-story leap.
- 28 June 1978: A Vietnam Civil Aviation Douglas DC-4, registration VN-C501, was hijacked by four people who were equipped with a Makarov pistol, knives and a grenade. The hijackers had a gunfight with crew members and security guards. Three of the four hijackers were killed by grenades exploding and falling from the plane. The plane was written off a year after the hijacking.
- (United States) August 25, 1978: TWA Flight 830 was hijacked by an unknown person, who hid among the passengers. The hijacker delivered detailed instructions to the pilot, but all passengers (including the daughter of a US ambassador) along with the crew managed to simply disembark at their destination without incident.
- (Poland) (East Germany) (West Germany) August 30, 1978: LOT Polish Airlines Flight 165 was hijacked by two East Germans in order to escape to West Berlin. There were no casualties; the hijackers surrendered and were tried by the never-before-convened United States Court for Berlin.
- (Finland) September 30, 1978: Finnair Flight 405 was hijacked by Aarno Lamminparras; the flight was en route from Oulu to Helsinki. He requested a ransom of 675,000 markkas, which he received, and as a result he released all 44 passengers on board. Then he ordered the plane to fly him to Amsterdam, the Netherlands and then back to Oulu. He returned home and was arrested there the next day. He served seven years and one month in prison and now lives in Sweden. One of the passengers on board the hijacked plane was singer Monica Aspelund.
- December 20, 1978: Indian Airlines Flight 410 was hijacked by Bholanath Pandey and Devendra Pandey.They demanded the immediate release of Indian National Congress party leader Indira Gandhi who was imprisoned at that time on the charges of fraud and misconduct. In 1980, they were awarded with party tickets by the Indira Gandhi government in 1980, and Devendra Pandey eventually rose to become a minister in the government of the most populous state of India, Uttar Pradesh. This case was also mentioned by Jarnail Singh Bhindranwale to justify his claim regarding the hypocrisy of the Indian government.
- (United States) December 21, 1978: 17-year-old Robin Oswald hijacked TWA Flight 541 flying from Louisville to Kansas City claiming she had three sticks of dynamite. The plane landed at Williamson County Regional Airport where she hoped to seek the release of Garrett Trapnell who was serving time at Marion Federal Penitentiary. Trapnell was serving time for a January 28, 1972 hijacking, and on May 24, 1978 Oswald's mother Barbara Ann had been killed whilst hijacking a helicopter in an attempt to rescue Trapnell. Oswald eventually surrendered at the Williamson Airport. The dynamite was revealed to be flares.
- (Australia) April 4, 1979: Domico Speranza, an Italian national, attempted to hijack a Boeing 747SP operating Pan American World Airways Flight 815, taking a young woman hostage and boarding the emptied aircraft at a gate of Sydney Airport's international terminal. Police rescued the hostage but initially failed to subdue Speranza. Hours later, police stormed the aircraft and shot him in the shoulder and forehead. Speranza died in hospital later that evening from his injuries.
- June 12, 1979: A Delta Air Lines wide‐bodied jetliner carrying 207 passengers and crew members on a flight from New York to Fort Lauderdale, Florida, was diverted to Cuba by a hijacker.
- (United States) (Republic of Ireland) June 20, 1979: Nikola Kavaja, a Serbian nationalist and anti-communist, hijacked American Airlines Flight 293. During the hijacking, Kavaja demanded and received another airplane, with the intent of crashing it into the headquarters of the Yugoslav Communist Party. His lawyer convinced him to surrender after landing at Shannon Airport, Ireland.

== 1980s ==
- (United States) July 11, 1980: Glenn Kurt Tripp, 17, of Arlington, Washington, was convicted of extortion and kidnapping in the hijack attempt of a Northwest plane at Seattle-Tacoma International Airport. He was sentenced to 20 years probation.
- (United States) September 8, 1980: Eastern Air Lines Flight 161, a Boeing 727 with 89 people on board flying from New York City to Tampa, was hijacked by a man who threatened to set the airliner on fire if it did not fly him to Cuba, then locked himself in the plane's lavatory. The airliner landed in Havana, Cuba, where Cuban soldiers arrested the hijacker. The plane then refueled and continued its flight to Tampa.
- March 2, 1981: Pakistan International Airlines flight PK-326 was on domestic trip from Karachi to Peshawar when it was hijacked midair by three heavily armed men who diverted it to Kabul, Afghanistan, and demanded the release of 92 political prisoners from Pakistani jails. On March 7, 29 hostages including women, children, and sick men were released in Kabul. The Boeing 720B stayed in Kabul for a week, and when Pakistani President Mohammad Zia-ul-Haq refused to give in, the hijackers shot Pakistani diplomat Tariq Rahim in full view of the other passengers and dumped his body onto the tarmac.
- March 28, 1981: The hijacking of Garuda Indonesia Flight 206, the first major Indonesian airline hijacking. The hijackers, a group called Commando Jihad, hijacked the DC 9 "Woyla", en route from Palembang to Medan, and ordered the pilot to fly the plane to Colombo, Sri Lanka. Since the plane did not have enough fuel, it refueled in Penang, Malaysia and again in Don Muang, Thailand. The hijackers demanded the release of Commando Jihad members imprisoned in Indonesia, and US$1.5 million, as well as a plane to take those prisoners to an unspecified destination. The plane was eventually stormed by Kopassus commandos. One commando was shot by the hijackers' leader, who then shot himself; all the other hijackers were killed. All the hostages were saved.
- (Republic of Ireland) May 2, 1981: Aer Lingus Flight 164 from Dublin to London was hijacked and diverted to Le Touquet in France by a man demanding that the Pope release the third secret of Fatima. While authorities negotiated with the hijacker by radio in the cockpit, French special forces entered the rear of the aircraft and overpowered him.
- September 29, 1981: Indian Airlines Flight 423, a Boeing 737 operating a domestic flight from Delhi to Amritsar in India, was hijacked by Sikh extremists and forced to land in Lahore, Pakistan, where special forces stormed the aircraft. There were no fatalities.
- (South Africa) November 26, 1981: Air India Flight 224 from Salisbury, Zimbabwe to Bombay was hijacked by mercenaries at Mahe Airport, Seychelles while on a refueling stop. The mercenaries were fleeing an abortive coup. The B707-300 (registration VT-DVB) was forced to fly to Durban. After freeing the 78 passengers and crew, the mercenaries surrendered.
- February 25, 1982: Kuwait Airways Flight KU561 from Kuwait to Beirut to Libya (return flight to Libya) was hijacked on the ground in Beirut, Lebanon on the return from Libya, with 150 aboard by Hamza akl Hamieh shortly after landing, demanding news and release of Imam Musa al-Sadr, founder of the Islamic group Amal, who had disappeared in Libya in 1978. It was the second longest hijacking in history, covering 6,000 miles. The hijackers threatened to kill passengers if demands were not met and Lebanese security forces did not withdraw from the area around the plane. Despite negotiations with a high level Shia cleric Sheikh Abdul Amir Qabala, it was the missing Imam's sister, Rehab, who persuaded Hamza to abandon the aircraft. Sheikh Qabala promised that appeals would be launched at the UN, The Arab League and the World Court to find Imam Sadr. Just after midnight he left the plane and disappeared. Captain Les Bradley flew the damaged plane back to Kuwait. There were no casualties.
- (Italy) July 1, 1982: A Sri Lankan, identified as Sepala Ekanayake, 33, hijacked an Alitalia Boeing 747 from Bangkok, Thailand, in order to be united with his wife and child and return to Sri Lanka.
- (India) August 4, 1982: An Indian Airlines flight from Delhi to Amritsar was hijacked en-route by a Sikh militant with the help of a fake bomb. The hijacked plane landed at Amritsar after being denied permission to land in Lahore, Pakistan. A police officer sent in disguised as a pilot and some passengers overpowered the hijacker when his attention was diverted.
- (India) August 20, 1982: A lone Sikh militant, armed with a pistol and a hand grenade, hijacked an Indian Airlines on a scheduled flight from Jodhpur to New Delhi carrying 69 persons. Indian security forces killed the hijacker and rescued all passengers. Peter Lamont, production designer working on the James Bond film Octopussy, was a passenger.
- (United States) January 20, 1983: Glenn Kurt Tripp, 20, of Arlington, Washington, claiming he had a bomb in a shoebox, tried to hijack a airliner to Afghanistan, and was shot dead by one of two Federal Bureau of Investigation agents who crept aboard when the plane landed at Portland. At 4:30 P.M., three hours after Northwest Flight 608 arrived from Seattle with six crew members and 35 passengers, FBI agents climbed into the cockpit of the plane on a remote runway of Portland International Airport. All 41 people aboard escaped unhurt and no bomb was found. Tripp had previously been convicted of extortion and kidnapping for an earlier July 11, 1980, hijack attempt at Seattle-Tacoma International Airport.
- (United States) February 16, 1983: An Iranian man, Hussein Shey Kholya, hijacked a Rio Airways Dash 7 flight Killeen, TX ILE- Dallas, TX DFW. The plane landed in Nuevo Laredo, Mexico.
- (Soviet Union) November 18, 1983: Tbilisi hijacking incident.
- (Bulgaria) March 7, 1983: A Balkan Bulgarian Airlines An-24 was hijacked shortly after taking off from Sofia to Varna. Four young men claiming to be recidivist criminals produced knives and took the 40 passengers and crew hostage, demanding passage to Vienna. After alerting the authorities, the pilots feigned a diversion while continuing to Varna. Upon landing, two officials pretending to be Austrian authorities engaged the hijackers in negotiations, allowing four commandos to storm the plane, disarm three hijackers and kill the last one after he stabbed a flight attendant, who survived.
- (Switzerland) (Italy) (Syria) (Iran) August 27, 1983: Armed with guns and grenades, hijackers seized an Air France Boeing 727 aircraft after departure from Vienna, Austria. They forced it to land in Geneva, then Sicily and Damascus – over which period 93 of the 111 passengers and crew were released – before arriving in Tehran. The hijackers demanded the release of Lebanese prisoners in French prisons and the withdrawal of French troops from Lebanon. After three days of negotiations in Tehran, the hijackers surrendered and all remaining passengers were released unharmed.
- (Brazil) February 3, 1984: a Cruzeiro do Sul Airbus A300 B4-203 flight 302 en route from São Luís to Belém-Val de Cães with 176 passengers and crew aboard was hijacked by three people who demanded to be taken to Cuba. The flight reached Camagüey in less than a day. There were no casualties.
- (India) July 5, 1984: On Indian Airlines Flight 405, nine Sikhs belonging to the Khalistan movement forced an Airbus A300 on a domestic flight from Srinagar to Delhi with 254 passengers and 10 crew on board to be flown to Lahore Airport in Pakistan. The demands of the hijackers (release of prisoners and money) were not met and they ultimately surrendered to Pakistani authorities on July 6.
- (West Germany) (Switzerland) (Lebanon) August 1, 1984: an Air France Boeing 737-200 en route from Frankfurt to Paris with 82 passengers and crew aboard was hijacked by three people who demanded to be taken to Tehran. They were Arab protesters against military cooperation between France and Iraq on the Iran–Iraq War context. One steward escaped from the hijacker in Larnaca. The hijacking duration was 48 hours. The hijackers destroyed the aircraft with explosives in front of the TV cameras. There were no casualties.
- (India) August 24, 1984: Seven young Sikh hijackers demanded that Indian Airlines Flight 421 flying from Delhi to Srinagar be flown to the United Arab Emirates. The plane was taken to UAE where the country's defense minister negotiated the release of the passengers. The hijacking was related to the Sikh secessionist struggle in the Indian state of Punjab.
- (Iran) November 6, 1984: Two Yemeni hijackers boarded Saudi Arabian Airlines Flight 040, a Lockheed L-1011 TriStar, during a stopover in Jeddah, Saudi Arabia. The flight was travelling from London to Riyadh. One of the Yemenis stormed the cockpit and demanded that the flight crew divert to Tehran. The hijackers were subdued and there were no casualties.
- (Lebanon) December 3, 1984: Kuwait Airways Flight 221 Lebanese Shi'a hijackers diverted a Kuwait Airways flight to Tehran. Two American USAID officials were shot dead and dumped on the tarmac. The plane was taken by Iranian security forces who were dressed as custodial staff.
- (Lebanon) (United States) June 14, 1985: Lebanese Shi'a Amal hijackers diverted TWA Flight 847 from Athens to Beirut with 153 people on board. Among the passengers was famous Greek singer Demis Roussos. Another passenger, US Navy diver Robert Stethem, was tortured and murdered during the hijacking. The stand-off ended after Israel freed 31 Lebanese prisoners.
- (Palestine) (Egypt) November 23, 1985: Three Palestinian members of the Abu Nidal Organization hijacked an Athens to Cairo route EgyptAir Flight 648 and demanded that it fly to Malta. Altogether 60 people died, most of them when Egyptian commandos stormed the aircraft.
- December 19, 1985: Yakutsk United Air Group Flight 101/435 was hijacked by the co-pilot and diverted to China. He was apprehended upon landing, while the passengers returned safely to the Soviet Union.
- (Taiwan) May 3, 1986: The Taiwanese pilot of China Airlines Flight 334 subdued his two crewmates on board the cargo flight to Bangkok, Thailand, and flew the plane to Guangzhou, mainland China, where he defected. The incident triggered the isolationist ROC government to reopen cross-strait negotiations and eventually scrap its Three Noes policy.
- (Pakistan) (United States) September 5, 1986: 22 people were killed when Pakistani security forces stormed Boeing 747-121 Pan Am Flight 73 at Karachi, carrying 360 passengers and crew after a 16-hour siege. The flight was en route to Frankfurt from Mumbai, India, when it was hijacked on the ground in Karachi. On 19 February 2016, the Bollywood movie Neerja, based on this hijacking, was released.
- (Iraq) December 25, 1986: 63 people were killed when Iraqi Airways Flight 163 crashed near Arar, Saudi Arabia due to an explosion in the cockpit. The plane was hijacked by three men of the Lebanese group Islamic Jihad.
- (United States) January 11, 1987: A Continental Airlines DC-9 was hijacked in flight by Norwood Emanuel. The flight's pilot, Captain Mark Meyer, was credited with thwarting the hijacking by quickly landing at Dulles International outside Washington DC. Meyer then confronted and distracted Emanuel in the rear of the cabin, allowing all 49 passengers and crew to successfully evacuate onto the ramp; Meyer escaped two hours later. The FBI eventually talked Emanuel off of the aircraft. There were no deaths or injuries.
- May 19, 1987: Air New Zealand Flight 24. An aircraft refueler at Nadi International Airport, Fiji, attempted to hijack an Air New Zealand Boeing 747-200 stopping at Nadi en route from Tokyo to Auckland. The hijacker entered the cockpit and held the captain, first officer and flight engineer hostage, demanding that the Timoci Bavadra-led government be restored after they were ousted in a military coup d'état six days earlier. After six hours, the hijacker got distracted and the flight engineer knocked him out with a bottle of whisky. None of the 105 passengers or 24 crew (including the three hostages) on board was injured.
- (Netherlands) (Italy) December 24, 1987: KLM Flight 343 was hijacked by 15 year old Zino Scioni who claimed he had a bomb that he said he could control with his wrist watch. He forced the plane to land at Rome and demanded $1 million ransom and a plane to take him to Kuwait then Chad and finally the United States. At 9 pm the hijacker released about 60 passengers. At 11 pm the hijacker was captured by tricking him to get into a car which he thought would take him to the plane and the rest of the hostages were released.
- (Soviet Union) March 8, 1988: Aeroflot Flight 3739 The Ovechkin family, a mother and 10 of her children, attempted to hijack a Tu 154 flight from Irkutsk to Leningrad intent upon escaping from the USSR by having it fly to Finland. The plane landed on a military airfield near Vyborg, just short of the Finnish border, and was then stormed. A flight attendant and three passengers were killed. The mother was killed by one of her sons at her own request, and then four of them committed suicide.
- April 5, 1988: Kuwait Airways Flight 422 was hijacked from Bangkok to Kuwait with 111 passengers and crew aboard, including three members of the Kuwaiti Royal Family. Six or seven Lebanese men (including Hassan Izz-Al-Din, a veteran of the TWA 847 hijacking) armed with guns and hand grenades forced the pilot to land in Mashhad, Iran and demanded the release of 17 Shiite Muslims guerrillas held in Kuwait. Lasting 16 days and traveling 3,200 miles from Mashhad to Larnaca, Cyprus, and finally to Algiers, it is the longest skyjacking to date. Two passengers, Abdullah Khalidi, 25, and Khalid Ayoub Bandar, 20, both Kuwaitis, were shot dead by the hijackers and dumped on the tarmac in Cyprus. Kuwait did not release the 17 prisoners and the hijackers were allowed to leave Algiers.
- (Brazil) September 29, 1988: a man hijacked a VASP Boeing 737-300 registration PP-SNT operating flight 375 en route from Belo Horizonte-Pampulha to Rio de Janeiro. He wanted to force a crash on the Palácio do Planalto, the official presidential workplace in Brasília. The pilot convinced the hijacker to divert to Goiânia where an emergency landing was made. The hijack ended with one victim.
- (West Germany) March 29, 1989: Two teenagers from Czechoslovakia armed with grenades and shotguns hijacked Malév Hungarian Airlines Flight 640 at Prague Ruzyně Airport, ordering the Tupolev Tu-154B with 15 hostages to fly to Frankfurt Airport before surrendering.

== 1990s ==
- (United States) January 16, 1990: America West Flight 727 flight from Houston Intercontinental Airport to Las Vegas McCarran Airport was hijacked by Jose Manuel Gonzalez-Gonzalez, who had been allowed to board despite complaints from other passengers about strange behavior. At cruise altitude, he took a flight attendant hostage, claimed to have a bomb, and demanded that the flight be diverted to Cuba. The pilot announced an ostensible refueling stop and landed the aircraft at Robert Mueller Municipal Airport, where it was met by two police officers. The pilot remained aboard while 34 passengers and four crew escaped using evacuation slides; the hijacker stayed in the rear lavatory with his hostage. One of the officers then boarded the aircraft with the intent to negotiate with the suspect, but subdued him with a flashlight to the head after finding him to be incoherent. The purported bomb was found to be a fake. Gonzalez-Gonzalez pleaded guilty, stating that his motive was to escape from "being murdered and silenced" by unspecified enemies that he had spent three weeks trying to evade. He also expressed a preference to be tried in Washington rather than Louisiana, calling the latter a banana republic. FBI officials said that a psychiatric evaluation of the hijacker may be needed.
- (United Kingdom) August 1, 1990: British Airways Flight 149 landed in Kuwait the same day that Iraq under Saddam Hussein invaded the country. The Iraqi Army seized the plane and held the passengers hostage. All but one of the hostages were released at the war's end, while the plane was destroyed.
- (Soviet Union) (Pakistan) August 19, 1990: Hijackers seized a plane that was being used for transportation of prisoners.
- October 2, 1990: A hijacker seized a plane from China which later crashed as it tried to land in Guangzhou, killing 128 people.
- (Malaysia) March 26, 1991: Singapore Airlines Flight 117 was hijacked en route from Subang Airport to Singapore Changi Airport by four people claiming to be members of the Pakistan Peoples Party. Elite Singapore Special Operations Force members stormed the plane on 27 March, killing all four hijackers and freeing all 114 passengers and 11 crew in an operation lasting just 30 seconds. None of the passengers and crew was injured.
- (Russia) November 9, 1991: Shamil Basaev seized a plane from Mineralnye Vody Airport and landed in Turkey in sign of protest of August Coup and State Committee on the State of Emergency.
- (Thailand) September 4, 1992: Vietnam Airlines Flight 850 (registration LZ-JXB) leased from Jes Air, with 127 occupants on board en route from Bangkok to Ho Chi Minh City, was hijacked by Ly Tong, a former pilot in the Republic of Vietnam Air Force. He then dropped anti-communist leaflets over Ho Chi Minh City before parachuting out. Vietnamese security forces later arrested him on the ground. The aircraft was landed safely, and no one on board was injured.
- (India) January 22, 1993: Indian Airlines Flight 810 en-route from Lucknow Airport to the Delhi-Indira Gandhi International Airport was hijacked by a Hindu activist and returned to Lucknow. The hijacker demanded the release of all Hindu karsevaks arrested after the demolition of the Babri Masjid and for a temple be built at Ram Janmabhoomi where the mosque once stood. The hijacker surrendered to officials after negotiations and the bomb he carried was found to be fake.
- (Germany) (Ethiopia) (United States) February 11, 1993: Lufthansa Flight 592 scheduled service from Frankfurt to Cairo and Addis Ababa, was hijacked at gunpoint by Ethiopian Nebiu Demeke. The A310 initially flew to Hannover for fuel before flying to New York's JFK, where the hijacker surrendered after brief negotiations. No passengers or crew were injured or killed.
- (India) March 27, 1993: Indian Airlines Fight 439 was hijacked en-route from Delhi to Madras by a hijacker claiming to be strapped with explosives. He forced the plane to land in Amritsar (after being denied landing permission in Lahore) and demanded political asylum in Pakistan. The hijacker subsequently surrendered and the explosive was found to be a disguised hairdryer.
- (India) April 10, 1993: An Indian Airlines Boeing 737-2A8, en route from Lucknow to Delhi, was hijacked by four students of the Government Arts College, Lucknow, claiming to be strapped with explosives. They demanded changes to the college's courses, cancellation of an award to a professor and postponement of exams. The hijackers were overpowered by passengers on return to the Lucknow Airport and subsequently arrested by the police. They were found to be only carrying a small knife.
- (India) April 24, 1993: Indian Airlines Flight 427, a domestic passenger flight between Srinagar and Delhi, was hijacked by a Hizbul Mujahideen militant. Commandos from the Indian National Security Guard rescued all 141 hostages on the ground at Amritsar airport. The lone hijacker, Mohammed Yousuf Shah, was killed before he could harm any of the hostages. The rescue was code-named Operation Ashwamedh.
- (Russia) September 15, 1993: A Russian Aeroflot passenger jet flying from Perm to Moscow was diverted to Gardermoen airport by two Iranian brothers. The hijackers surrendered and the hostages went free. The hijackers were later given asylum in Norway for humanitarian reasons.
- October 25, 1993: A Nigerian Airways airbus A310 flying from Lagos to Abuja, Nigeria was hijacked by four young men, members of Movement for the Advancement of Democracy. Although the initial plan was to land the hijacked plane in Germany, the flight was diverted to Niamey in Niger in order to refuel. On landing there, the hijackers found hundreds of armed gendarmes at the airport, but before then they had distributed their demands among the passengers, calling on the Nigerian government to overturn the annulment of the June 12 election and swear in Moshood Abiola, the acclaimed winner of the election. They gave the government 72 hours to meet their demands or else they would set the plane ablaze. However, they allowed 34 passengers to go and held onto the remaining 159 among whom were top Nigerian government officials. The four held on to the plane for some days until the gendarmes stormed the plane to rescue the remaining passengers.
- (United States) April 7, 1994: FedEx Flight 705 experienced an attempted hijacking by disgruntled ex-employee Auburn Calloway as it left Memphis, Tennessee. Calloway intended to crash the plane after being fired the previous day. He was subdued by the flight crew before an emergency landing back at Memphis.
- May 26, 1994: A Vietnamese asylum seeker returning to Vietnam from an Indonesian refugee camp attempted to hijack a Garuda Indonesia charter flight from Indonesia to Australia. Shortly after takeoff from Batam, the man took out a gasoline-filled shampoo bottle and splashed gasoline near the cockpit door and threatened to light himself on fire unless the flight diverted to Australia. A Garuda mechanic and other asylum seekers overpowered the man and the flight continued to Vietnam, where the man was taken into custody upon arrival.
- (Algeria) December 24, 1994: Air France Flight 8969 was hijacked from Algiers by four GIA hijackers planning to crash into the Eiffel Tower in central Paris. After the murders of three passengers, GIGN commandos stormed the plane in Marseille, killing all hijackers and freeing the remaining passengers.
- (Albania) (Afghanistan) August 3, 1995: In the Airstan incident, a Russian cargo jet flying from Tirana to Kabul was forced to land in Kandahar by Taliban forces. Its flight-crew were held in captivity until escaping in 1996.
- (Iran) September 20, 1995: Iranian defector and flight attendant Rida Garari hijacked Kish Air Flight 707, which landed in Israel. There were no casualties.
- (Lebanon) (Bulgaria) September 3, 1996: A Hemus Air Tu-154 aircraft was hijacked by the Palestinian Nadir Abdallah, flying from Beirut to Varna. The hijacker demanded that the aircraft be refueled and given passage to Oslo, Norway after landing at Varna Airport. All of the 150 passengers were freed at Varna; afterwards the crew continued the flight to Oslo, where the hijacker surrendered and asked for political asylum.
- (Ethiopia) (Kenya) November 23, 1996: Ethiopian Airlines Flight 961 crashed into the Indian Ocean near a beach in the Comoros Islands after hijackers, demanding to be flown to Australia, refused to allow the pilot to land and refuel the plane. 125 passengers died when the plane cartwheeled on impacting the water, and the remaining 50 passengers survived with minor injuries. The ditching was captured on video, filmed from the beach.
- June 9, 1997: Two Turkish men hijacked Air Malta Flight 830 en route from Malta to Turkey on June 9, 1997. They surrendered to police at an airport in Cologne, Germany, on the same day and freed without incident about 80 passengers and crew members on board. They demanded the release of Mehmet Ali Ağca, who attempted to assassinate Pope John Paul II in 1981.
- (Pakistan) May 25, 1998: Four men hijacked PIA Flight 544 en route from Gwadar to Turbat. The hijackers were arrested without incurring casualties.
- (Colombia) 12 April 1999: A Fokker 50 operating Avianca Flight 9463 from Bogotá to Bucaramanga was hijacked by six ELN members, who forced the plane to make an emergency landing on a clandestine runway in the Bolivar region. A few of the roughly 40 passengers were released quickly, others were occasionally released when private ransom monies were paid. A negotiator – a celebrity comedian – was killed. Many hostages were held captive for more than a year, and one passenger died during that time of a heart attack. The last hostage was not released until 19 months after the hijacking, on 22 November 2000. Passenger Leszli Kálli wrote a book about her experience based on her diaries; tedium was her biggest complaint.
- (Japan) July 23, 1999: All Nippon Airways Flight 61 was hijacked by a lone man. He killed the pilot before being subdued.
- (Nepal) (United Arab Emirates) (Afghanistan) December 24, 1999: Pakistan-based hijackers hijacked Indian Airlines Flight 814 en route from Kathmandu and diverted it to Amritsar, Lahore, Dubai, and finally Kandahar. After a week-long stand-off, India agreed to release three jailed terrorists in exchange for the hostages. One hostage was stabbed to death and his body thrown on the tarmac as a "warning attack".

== 2000s ==
- (Uzbekistan) (Kazakhstan) (Russia) (United Kingdom) February 6, 2000: Ariana Afghan Airlines Boeing 727 was hijacked on a domestic flight within Taliban-controlled Afghanistan, and ended up at London Stansted Airport, where most of the passengers claimed political asylum.
- May 25, 2000: Philippine Airlines Flight 812 was hijacked en route from Davao City, Philippines to Manila. The hijacker parachuted from the aircraft while still airborne; his body was later found.
- (Brazil) August 18, 2000: A VASP Boeing 737-2A1 registration PP-SMG en route from Foz do Iguaçu to Curitiba-Afonso Pena was hijacked by five people planning to steal BRL 5 million (approximately US$2.75 million) that the aircraft was transporting. The pilot was forced to land at Porecatu where the hijackers fled with the money. No one was injured.
- (United Kingdom) October 14, 2000: Saudi Arabian Airlines Flight 115 flying from Jeddah to London was hijacked en route by two men who claimed they were armed with explosives. The hijackers commandeered the Boeing 777-200 to Baghdad, Iraq, where all 90 passengers and 15 crew members were safely released. The two hijackers, identified as Lieutenant Faisal Naji Hamoud Al-Bilawi and First Lieutenant Ayesh Ali Hussein Al-Fareedi, both Saudi citizens, were arrested and later extradited to Saudi Arabia in 2003.
- (Russia) November 11, 2000: A Vnukovo Airlines Tu-154 flying from Makhachkala to Moscow was hijacked by a man demanding it be diverted to Israel. The plane landed at an Israeli military base where the hijacker surrendered. None of 59 people on board was injured.
- January 23, 2001: Yemenia Flight 448 was hijacked by a man armed with a pen gun who demanded to be taken to Baghdad, Iraq. In addition to his gun, he claimed to have explosives hidden in his suitcase. The flight crew convinced the hijacker to divert to Djibouti to refuel, where they overpowered him. He was extradited to Yemen, and sentenced to 15 years in prison.
- (Russia) (Turkey) March 15, 2001: Vnukovo Airlines Flight 2806, flying from Istanbul to Moscow was hijacked by three Chechens demanding it be diverted to Saudi Arabia. After the plane with 174 people on board landed at Medina the hijacker threatened to blow it up unless it would be refueled for flying to Afghanistan. The Saudi authorities stormed the plane. During the assault, Saudi police killed two people: one of the passengers (a Turkish citizen) and the leader of the hijackers. Flight attendant Yulia Fomina was killed during the hijacking, and the plane was later named after her.
- (United States) September 11, 2001: American Airlines Flight 11, United Airlines Flight 175, American Airlines Flight 77, and United Airlines Flight 93 were hijacked on the morning of September 11 by Al-Qaeda-affiliated Islamists and used as suicide weapons. Flights 11 and 175 were deliberately crashed into the Twin Towers of the World Trade Center, Flight 77 was crashed into the Pentagon, and Flight 93 crashed into a field in Pennsylvania after hijackers crashed the plane due to a revolt by passengers. Both towers of the World Trade Center collapsed, and the Pentagon was severely damaged along its western façade; in total 2,996 people, including the 19 hijackers, were killed and over 6,000 people were injured. The suicide attacks would ultimately lead to the war on terror.
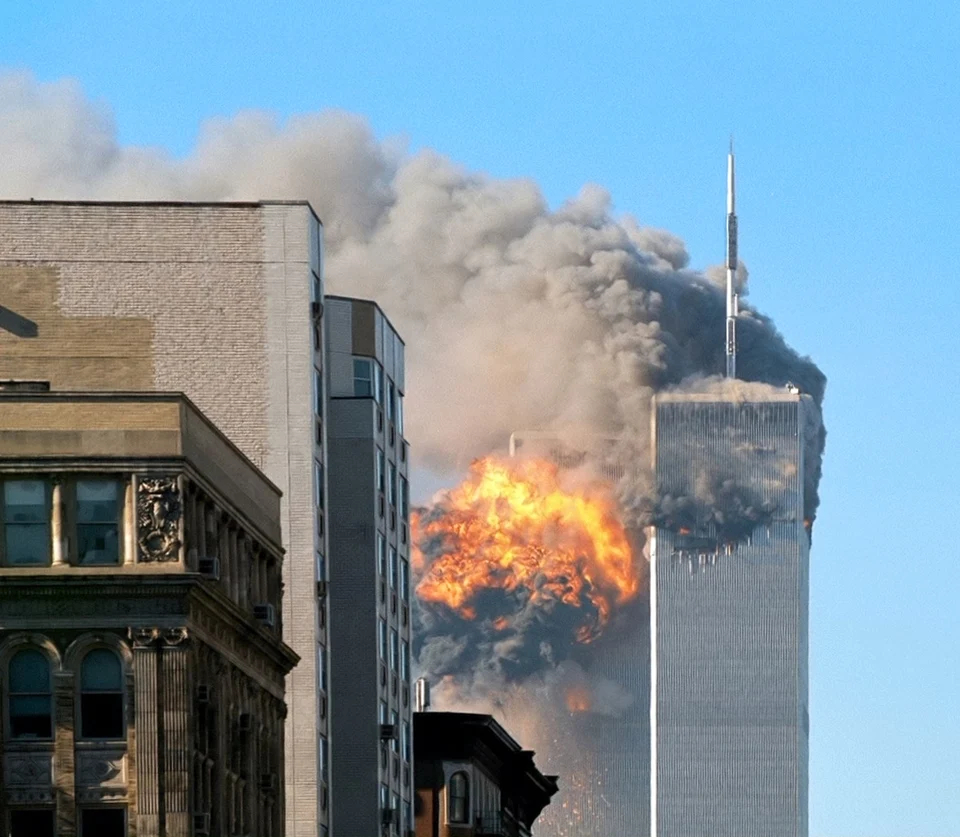
  United Airlines Flight 175 explodes after crashing into the South Tower of the World Trade Center on September 11, 2001.
- January 5, 2002: A 15 year-old high-school student of East Lake High School in Tarpon Springs, Florida, United States, hijacked a Cessna 172 light aircraft and crashed it into the side of the Bank of America Tower in downtown Tampa, Florida. The impact killed the teenager and damaged an office room, but there were no other injuries. He was inspired by the September 11 attacks.
- (Australia) May 29, 2003: 10 minutes after take off, a man attempted to hijack Qantas Flight 1737 flying from Melbourne Airport to Launceston Airport with two sharpened wooden stakes from his pocket. He was overpowered by the flight purser and other passengers.
- (Albania) (Turkey) October 3, 2006: Turkish Airlines Flight 1476, flying from Tirana to Istanbul, was hijacked by Hakan Ekinci in Greek airspace. The aircraft, with 107 passengers and six crew on board, transmitted two coded hijack signals which were picked up by the Greek air force; the flight was intercepted by military aircraft and landed safely at Brindisi, Italy.
- January 24, 2007: An Air West Boeing 737 was hijacked over Sudan, but landed safely at N'Djamena, Chad.
- (Mauritania) (Spain) (France) February 15, 2007: An Air Mauritanie Boeing 737 flying from Nouakchott to Las Palmas with 87 passengers on board was hijacked by a man who wanted to fly to Paris, but the plane landed in an air base near Las Palmas and the hijacker, a Moroccan, was arrested.
- (Cyprus) (Turkey) August 18, 2007: An Atlasjet MD-80 en route from Nicosia to Istanbul was hijacked by two Arab students, who said they were Al Qaeda operatives and wanted to go to Tehran, Iran. The plane landed in Antalya, the passengers escaped and the hijackers were arrested.
- (New Zealand) February 8, 2008: Eagle Airways Flight 2279 a British Aerospace Jetstream 32EP ZK-ECN flying from Blenheim to Christchurch was hijacked shortly after takeoff. The hijacker demanded the flight be diverted to Australia and stabbed both pilots and a passenger before the plane safely landed at Christchurch Airport. She alleged there were two explosive devices on board, but after an inspection by NZ Police nothing was found.
- (Egypt) August 26, 2008: A Sun Air Boeing 737 flying from Nyala, Darfur, in Western Sudan to the Sudanese capital, Khartoum, was hijacked shortly after takeoff. The hijackers demanded to be taken to France where they reputedly wanted to gain asylum. The plane initially tried to land at Cairo but was refused permission. It subsequently touched down at Kufra, Libya. The hijackers gave themselves up almost 24 hours after taking the plane. There were no reported casualties.
- April 19, 2009: CanJet Flight 918, a Boeing 737-800 preparing to depart from the Sangster International Airport in Montego Bay, Jamaica to Canada, was hijacked by a gunman who forced his way through airport security onto the plane and demanded the crew to fly him to Cuba. Most of the passengers on the plane gave him money to buy their freedom. For the rest of the night, negotiations took place as six crew members were held hostage in the flight for several hours. Quick responses from the police force allowed them to disarm the hijacker and arrest him. There were no casualties.
- September 9, 2009: AeroMéxico Flight 576, a Boeing 737-800 flying from Cancún to Mexico City was hijacked by José Marc Flores Pereira, a Bolivian citizen claiming he had a bomb and demanding to speak to Mexican president Felipe Calderón. The plane landed at Mexico City International Airport where it then taxied to a remote stand where the passengers and crew were later released. Mexican officials stormed the plane where five men were taken into custody with only one being held. There were no casualties. It was the first hijacking for the airline.

== 2010s–2020s ==
| Date | Flight | Departure | Destination (Note: Intended) | Success (Note: Successful attempts include incidents where the hijacker(s) gain(s) complete control of the aircraft and occupants.) | Short Summary |
|---|---|---|---|---|---|
| January 5, 2011 | Turkish Airlines Flight 1754 | (Norway) Oslo | (Turkey) Istanbul | No | Turkish Airlines Flight 1754, flying from Oslo to Istanbul, was in Bulgarian airspace when an unsuccessful attempt was made to hijack it. The hijacker allegedly stated he had a bomb and would blow up the aircraft unless the plane returned to Norway. Some passengers overpowered the hijacker and the flight safely landed at Atatürk International Airport at 9:30 p.m., the pilot having meanwhile notified air-traffic controllers of the situation and requested the presence of emergency services on the ground. All 60 passengers and seven crew disembarked the aircraft; no-one was injured during the incident. The hijacker was arrested. |
| June 29, 2012 | Tianjin Airlines Flight GS7554 | (China) Hotan | (China) Ürümqi | No | An attempt was made to hijack Tianjin Airlines Flight GS7554 from Hotan to Ürümqi. Six people, all of Uyghur ethnicity, tried to hijack the aircraft 10 minutes after takeoff. Among the passengers aboard were six police officers, four in plain clothes, flying on a business trip. The hijackers used aluminium canes with sharpened tips to attack the members of the flight-crew. The police officers and civilians on board subdued the hijackers, and the plane returned to Hotan in 22 minutes after takeoff. |
| February 7, 2014 | Pegasus Airlines Flight 751 | (Ukraine) Kharkiv | (Turkey) Istanbul | No | A man attempted to hijack Pegasus Airlines Flight 751 on a flight from Kharkiv, Ukraine, to Istanbul, Turkey, saying he had a bomb on board, and demanding to be flown to Sochi, the host city of the 2014 Winter Olympics. The pilots turned off the inflight monitors and landed at Istanbul's Sabiha Gökçen Airport, fooling the man into thinking he was landing in Sochi. The plane, a Boeing 737-800, was escorted to Istanbul by two Turkish F-16 fighter jets. The man, who appeared to be severely intoxicated, was detained by police and taken to the Istanbul Security Headquarters. |
| February 17, 2014 | Ethiopian Airlines Flight 702 | (Ethiopia) Addis Ababa | (Italy) Rome | Yes | Ethiopian Airlines Flight 702, a scheduled flight from Addis Ababa to Rome was hijacked by the unarmed co-pilot, who had locked the pilot out of the cockpit, then flew to Geneva Airport. According to the airline, the Boeing 767-300, registration ET-AMF, was flying north over Sudan when it changed its transponder to indicate a hijacking. The aircraft circled Geneva airport several times, before landing around 6:00am with one engine and less than 10 minutes of fuel remaining. The co-pilot surrendered to police after the plane landed. |
| March 29, 2016 | EgyptAir Flight 181 | (Egypt) Alexandria | (Egypt) Cairo | Yes | EgyptAir Flight 181, an Airbus A320 carrying 81 passengers from Alexandria to Cairo, was taken over by a passenger who said he was wearing an explosives belt, and was diverted to Larnaca International Airport in Cyprus (per demand). The hijacker surrendered after hours of negotiations and no casualties were reported. |
| December 23, 2016 | Afriqiyah Airways Flight 209 | (Libya) Sebha | (Libya) Tripoli | Yes | An Airbus A320 carrying 118 passengers from Sebha, Libya to Tripoli, was forced to land at Malta International Airport with two men on board claiming to carry a hand grenade. The hijackers tried to blow the aircraft up, but eventually surrendered to authorities with no incident or loss of life. |
| February 24, 2019 | Biman Bangladesh Airlines Flight 147 | Dhaka, Bangladesh | (United Arab Emirates) Dubai | No | An unidentified 26-year-old male passenger attempted to hijack a commercial flight from Dhaka, Bangladesh, to Dubai. After the pilots were able to make an emergency landing at Shah Amanat International Airport, the Bangladesh Army Para-Commando Brigade boarded the aircraft and shot/killed the hijacker. |
| July 7, 2021 | Commercial | (United States) Bethel Airport, Alaska | (United States) Aniak Airport, Alaska | Partial | An unidentified male passenger grabbed the flight controls of a Ryan Air Services Cessna 208 Caravan on approach to Aniak Airport after a scheduled flight from Bethel Airport in Alaska carrying a single pilot and four other passengers. The man briefly placed the aircraft in a nosedive at low altitude before being pushed away by the pilot and restrained by other passengers. The pilot regained control and landed the aircraft safely; no injuries were reported. The man was arrested by Alaska State Troopers and admitted that his actions were an attempted murder-suicide. He was charged with several counts of assault, attempted assault, and making terroristic threats. |
| October 22, 2023 | Alaska Airlines Flight 2059 | (United States) Paine Field, Washington | (United States) San Francisco | No | Alaska Airlines Flight 2059 was diverted to Portland International Airport in Oregon, after an off-duty male pilot riding jump seat in the cockpit of a Horizon Embraer E175 reportedly pulled the engine fire extinguisher handles, which would cut the fuel supply and cause a flameout if they were fully deployed. The crew was able to subdue him, prevent an engine flameout (by resetting the "T-handle" that controlled the fire suppression system), and landed safely. Joseph David Emerson was later arrested in Portland and charged with 83 counts of attempted murder, 83 counts of reckless endangerment and one count of endangering an aircraft. |
| April 17, 2025 | Tropic Air Flight 711 | (Belize) Corozal | (Belize) San Pedro | No | Tropic Air Flight 711, a Cessna 208B Grand Caravan EX flying from Corozal to San Pedro, was hijacked by Akinyela Sawa Taylor, a 49 year-old American citizen who was armed with a knife. The hijacker stabbed three passengers, but was shot dead during the emergency landing of the plane in Belize City. The emergency landing was carried out after the aircraft nearly ran out of fuel. |
| July 15, 2025 | Private | (Canada) Victoria International Airport | None | Yes | An unidentified pilot stole a Cessna 172 from the Victoria Flying Club (located in Victoria, British Columbia) and flew to Vancouver International Airport. After causing at least nine flights to be delayed and diverted, the suspect was arrested shortly after landing without incident. |
| December 2, 2025 | Private | South Sudan | Unknown | Yes | A Samaritan's Purse Cessna 208 was hijacked in South Sudan. The hijacker demanded to fly to Chad but was convinced to let the pilot refuel. The aircraft made an emergency landing in Wau Airport, South Sudan. |
| June 1, 2026 | Frontier Airlines Flight 3345 | (United States) Luis Muñoz Marín International Airport | (United States) Chicago O’Hare | No | Frontier Airlines Flight 3345, an Airbus A321 operating from Luis Muñoz Marín International Airport in San Juan, Puerto Rico, to Chicago O’Hare International Airport, was diverted to Miami International Airport after a passenger, 51‑year‑old Juan Gabriel Reyes, attempted to open an emergency exit door but was prevented by a flight attendant. Afterwards, he shoved his shoulder against the cockpit door. Again, a flight attendant stopped him and reseated him on the other side of the aisle from an off‑duty Frontier flight attendant. Reyes then attempted to choke the off‑duty attendant. Passengers restrained Reyes with seatbelt extenders. |
| September 30, 2026 | Flydubai Flight 1073 | (United Arab Emirates) Dubai International Airport | (Israel) Ben Gurion Airport | Partial | Flydubai Flight 1073, a Boeing 737 Max 8 flying from Dubai International Airport to Tel Aviv's Ben Gurion Airport was diverted to Tabuk Regional Airport (Saudi Arabia) after attempted hijacking by the co-pilot who had stabbed the captain. According to Israeli officials, the co-pilot told UAE interrogators that he had planned the attack before he was hired by Flydubai. |

== See also ==
- Korean Air incidents and accidents
- List of Cuba–United States aircraft hijackings
- List of hijackings of Indian aeroplanes
- List of hijackings of Turkish airplanes
