= Flight 612 =

Flight 612 may refer to:

- Pulkovo Aviation Enterprise Flight 612, crashed on the 22nd of August, 2006.
- Air West Flight 612, hijacked on January 24, 2007
