= Flight 293 =

Flight 293 may refer to:

- Northwest Orient Airlines Flight 293, crashed on 3 June 1963
- American Airlines Flight 293, hijacked on 20 June 1979
- Miami Air Flight 293, crashed on 3 May 2019
- Turkish Airlines Flight 293, hijacked on 30 October 1980, known as "the happiest hijacking ever"
