= Flight 592 =

Flight 592 can refer to:

- Lufthansa Flight 592, aircraft hijacking in 1993
- ValuJet Flight 592, in-flight fire resulting in a crash in 1996
