= Eastern Air Lines Shuttle Flight 1320 =

1970 aircraft hijacking

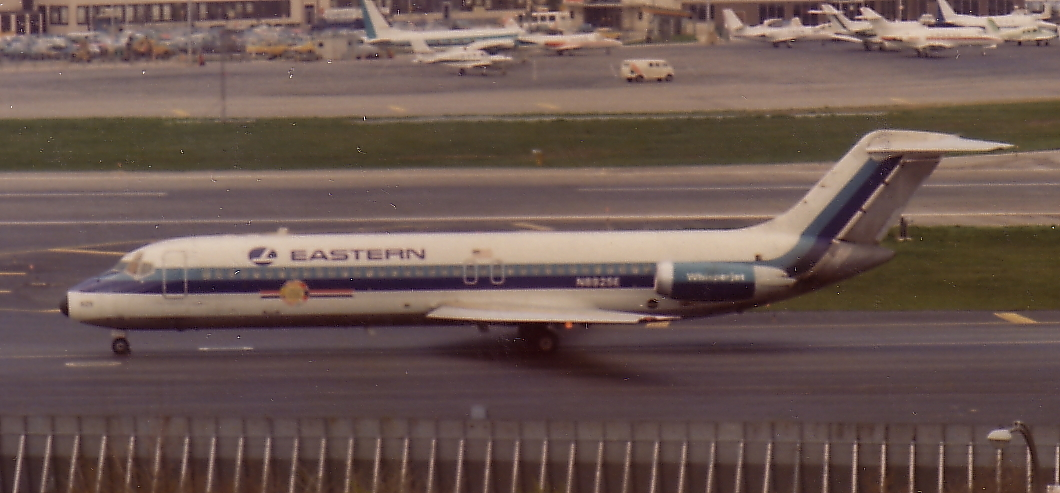
- N8925E, the aircraft involved in the hijacking

Hijack
- Date: March 17, 1970
- Summary: Aircraft hijacking
- Site: Boston-Logan International Airport, MA, USA

Aircraft
- Aircraft type: McDonnell Douglas DC-9-31
- Operator: Eastern Air Lines
- Registration: N8925E
- Flight origin: Newark Liberty International Airport, Newark NJ
- Destination: Logan International Airport, Boston, MA
- Passengers: 68
- Crew: 5
- Fatalities: 1
- Injuries: 2
- Survivors: 72

Eastern Air Lines Shuttle Flight 1320, carrying passengers from Newark to Boston, was hijacked around 7:30 p.m. on March 17, 1970, by John J. Divivo who was armed with a .38 caliber revolver. Captain Robert Wilbur Jr., 35, a former United States Air Force pilot who had been promoted to captain six months prior, was confronted by Divivo, who ordered him to fly east and alert him when the plane was a few minutes away from running out of fuel.

Something startled the apparently suicidal hijacker, who shot the copilot, James Hartley, 30. Despite being mortally wounded, Hartley was able to force the gun from Divivo's hand and shoot the would-be hijacker three times before lapsing into unconsciousness, and eventual death. The hijacker also shot the pilot Wilbur in the arms. Despite his wounds and his copilot being shot and unconscious, Wilbur safely landed his aircraft while talking to air traffic control, telling them his copilot was shot and needed emergency services.

Wilbur: We're on 3100 and you better get the police at the airport. The copilot is shot. Get us in a hurry BOS.
Boston ATC: 1320, I gotcha, continue right inbound to the airport. You're 13 miles east, indent on code 04.
Wilbur: Ok, get-get an ambulance to the airport also. My copilot is discombobulated. He can't talk or anything. He's passed out. We've been shot.

Despite his injuries, Divivo arose and began clawing at Captain Wilbur, attempting to force a crash. Wilbur hit Divivo over the head with the gun he had retrieved from the center console. The pilot was able to land the plane safely at Logan International Airport, and the hijacker was arrested. On October 31, 1970, Divivo hanged himself in Charles Street Jail while awaiting trial for murder.

The incident was the first aircraft hijacking in the United States to end with a fatality other than the hijacker. Previous hijackings were treated as a tolerable inconvenience and expense, and airlines resisted security measures to avoid scaring away passengers. No advance bookings were required, and fares were paid onboard. The fatality and threat of an intentional crash prompted the first airport security passenger screenings in the United States to begin within a few weeks, though not everyone was screened at first.

== See also ==
- Federal Express Flight 705 – 1994 incident involving a suicidal hijacker who was overpowered by an airline flight crew
- List of accidents and incidents involving commercial aircraft
- List of aircraft hijackings
