= List of hijackings of Turkish airplanes =

The list of hijackings of Turkish airplanes is a listing of hijackings or hijacking attempts occurred on Turkish aircraft since the first ever incident in 1972.

== 1970s ==
- May 3, 1972 – A DC-9 airplane of Turkish Airlines named Boğaziçi on the way from Ankara to Istanbul was hijacked by four leftist militants to Sofia, Bulgaria. Among the passengers was Ömer İnönü, son of former President İsmet İnönü. The hijackers, Sefer Şimşek, Yaşar Aydın, Mehmet Yılbaz and Aynullah Akça demanded the release of Deniz Gezmiş and his comrades from prison, all members of the Communist organization People's Liberation Army of Turkey who were sentenced to death and awaiting execution. After landing in Sofia, they handed over the aircraft to the Bulgarian authorities and applied for political asylum.
- October 22, 1972 – Turkish Airlines aircraft Truva on a scheduled domestic flight from Istanbul to Ankara was hijacked and diverted to Sofia by four members of the People's Liberation Army of Turkey: Hacı Özdemir, Derviş Elmacıoğlu, Yücel Bozkurt and Ahmet Maden. Landing in Sofia, the hijackers handed over the airplane to the Bulgarian authorities and applied for political asylum.
- May 1, 1976 – Zeki Ejder, a Turkish citizen working in France, attempted to hijack the a DC-10 aircraft named İzmir of Turkish Airlines bound to Istanbul from Paris in order to land it in Marseille. The hijacker was persuaded to stand down and the airliner returned safely to Charles de Gaulle Airport in Paris.
- February 13, 1977 – A police cadet, Adnan Mintaş, attempted to hijack Turkish Airlines Trakya to Belgrade, Yugoslavia, which had departed from Istanbul for İzmir.
- March 19, 1977 – Turkish Airlines aircraft with 173 passengers on board flying from Diyarbakır to Ankara was hijacked by two underaged hijackers armed with hand guns to Beirut, Lebanon. İsmail Açan and Hanefi Güzel, who wanted to go to Palestine, surrendered with the initiative of Lebanese Prime Minister Selim al-Hoss.

== 1980s ==
- October 13, 1980 – Turkish Airlines Boeing 727 type aircraft Diyarbakır was hijacked on the flight from Munich, West Germany to Ankara via Istanbul by four radical Islamist militants. The hijackers were arrested after the aircraft landed in Diyarbakır for refueling.
- May 24, 1981 – Four leftist militants hijacked Turkish Airlines DC-9 aircraft Haliç on a domestic flight from Istanbul to Ankara and demanded to go to Burgas, Bulgaria. As two of the hijackers left the airliner for a while after landing, the two others were overwhelmed by the passengers.
- April 15, 1983 – Turkish Airlines aircraft Ankara, flying from Istanbul to İzmir with 6 crew and 107 passengers on board, was hijacked to Athens, Greece by Mehmet Kalkan, who was believed to be a psychopath.
- June 28, 1985 – Yusuf Örer, who was deported from West Germany, attempted to hijack Turkish Airlines aircraft Kars on the flight from Frankfurt, West Germany to Istanbul for landing in Vienna, Austria. The pilot and the flight engineer overwhelmed him with the help of passengers immediately after the attempt.

== 1990s ==
- March 8, 1996 – A Boeing 727 of Cyprus Turkish Airlines on a flight from Nicosia to Istanbul was hijacked by Ramazan Aydın to Munich, Germany.
- February 24, 1998 – Turkish Airlines aircraft Gaziantep of type RJ 100 bound for Ankara from Adana with 63 passengers and 5 crew on board was hijacked by Mehmet Dağ to Diyarbakır. The hijacker, claiming he had a bomb inside his teddy bear, wanted to divert the plane to Iran. The passengers overwhelmed him.
- March 30, 1998 – Cyprus Turkish Airlines aircraft on the way from Nicosia to Ankara was hijacked by Mehmet Ertürk, who was carrying a lighter shaped like a hand grenade. The airliner landed in Ankara, and the hijacker was arrested.
- September 14, 1998 – An Airbus of Turkish Airlines, departed from Ankara for Istanbul, was hijacked by İhsan Akyüz, who was armed with a toy pistol. Following the forced landing in Trabzon, the hijacker surrendered.
- October 29, 1998 – Turkish Airlines Flight 487 on a Boeing 737 named Ayvalık en route from Adana to Istanbul was hijacked by a PKK militant on Republic Day. The hijacker, armed with a pistol and a hand grenade demanded to fly to Zurich, Switzerland via Sofia, Bulgaria. The pilot flew circles around Ankara then landed at Esenboğa Airport, pretending to be landing in Sofia. The hijacker was killed by security forces and no one else was harmed.

== 2000s ==
- March 28, 2003 – Turkish Airlines aircraft Ergene on the way from Ankara to Istanbul was hijacked and forced to land in Athens, Greece. The hijacker, Özgür Genç surrendered.
- October 3, 2006 – Turkish Airlines Flight 1476 with airplane Çanakkale en route from Tirana, Albania to İstanbul was hijacked by Turkish citizen Hakan Ekinci in Greek airspace. The hijacker surrendered after the forced landing in Brindisi, Italy.
- April 10, 2007 – Pegasus Airlines aircraft on the way from Diyarbakır to Istanbul was hijacked by Mehmet Gökşingöl and was forced to land at Esenboğa Airport in Ankara. Security forces overwhelmed the hijacker some time later.
- August 18, 2007 – A Palestinian and a Turkish citizen hijacked an MD-83 type aircraft of Atlasjet leased to World Focus Airlines on the flight KK 1011 from Nicosia to Istanbul. The hijackers, armed with a knife and fake plastic bomb, tried unsuccessfully to enter the cockpit and demanded to fly to Tehran, Iran. The aircraft with 6 crew and 136 passengers landed in Antalya for refueling. The hijackers, a Syrian passport holder Palestinian, Mommen Abdül Aziz Talik, and a Turkish student in Cyprus, Mehmet Reşat Öz, released the children and the women on board. At this moment, the pilots and most of the passengers escaped by jumping from the aircraft. The hijackers held a few passengers and flight attendants hostage, but surrendered five hours later.

== 2010s ==
- January 5, 2011 – Turkish Airlines Flight 1754, flying from Oslo to Istanbul, was in Bulgarian airspace when an attempt was allegedly made to hijack it. The suspect allegedly said that he had a bomb and that he would blow up the aircraft unless the plane returned to Norway. Some passengers overpowered the hijacker and the flight safely landed at Atatürk International Airport at 9:30 p.m after the pilot notified emergency services. All 60 passengers and seven crew got off the aircraft; none were injured during the incident. The suspect was arrested, and it was later revealed he was on his way to Turkey after having been denied asylum status in Norway, which promptly led to him being forced back to his country of origin.
