= Aeroméxico Flight 576 =

2009 aircraft hijacking

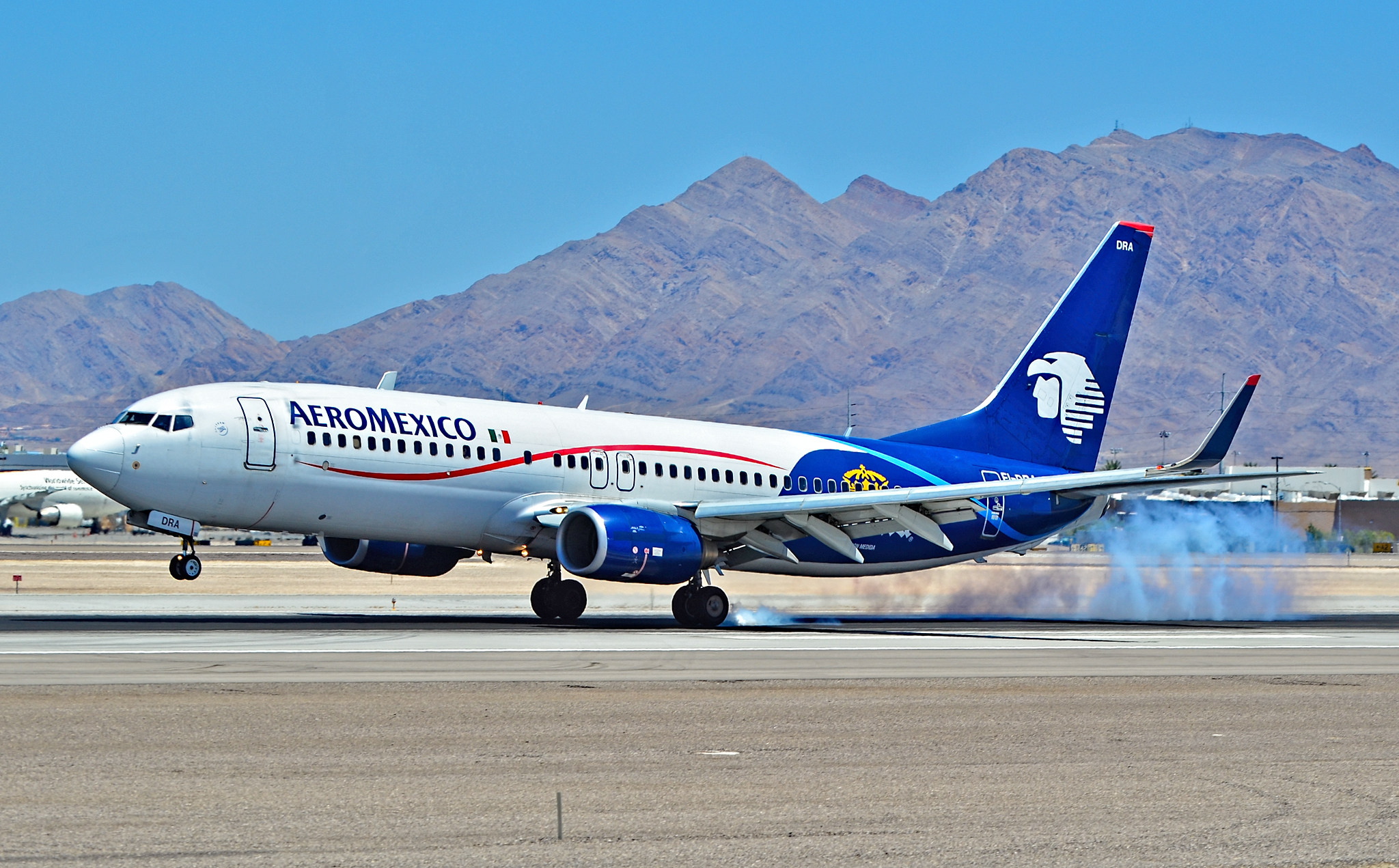
- EI-DRA, the aircraft that was hijacked

Hijacking
- Date: 9 September 2009
- Summary: Hijacking
- Site: Cancun en route to Mexico City

Aircraft
- Aircraft type: Boeing 737-852
- Operator: Aeroméxico
- Registration: EI-DRA
- Flight origin: Cancún International Airport
- Destination: Mexico City International Airport
- Occupants: 107
- Passengers: 101
- Crew: 6
- Fatalities: 0
- Survivors: 107

Aeroméxico Flight 576 was a Mexican domestic passenger flight from Cancún to Mexico City that was hijacked on 9 September 2009. The plane was flown to Mexico City International Airport where the passengers were released. A short while later, the crew was also released and authorities detained five men in connection with the hijacking. However, only one of those taken into custody was identified as the perpetrator by the authorities. The hijacker's main demand was to speak with President Felipe Calderón. This has been the only hijacking for Aeroméxico.

== Aircraft ==
The aircraft involved was a Boeing 737-852(WL), registration EI-DRA, manufacturer serial number (MSN) 35114, line number 2037, hex code 4CA4B3. It was built at Renton Municipal Airport with test registration N1779B and first flew on 18 August 2006. It was delivered new to Aeroméxico on 6 September 2006 on lease from AerCap. It was powered by a pair of CFMI CFM56-7B27 engines and used the C16Y144 configuration. After the incident, the aircraft remained in operation with Aeroméxico, the airline having since purchased the plane from the former lessor and re-registered it as XA-DRA, but as of April 2024, the aircraft is currently stored.

== Flight from Cancún to Mexico City ==
The plane, Aeroméxico Flight 576, took off from Cancún International Airport at 11:38 local time (17:38 UTC), according to flight records. It was originally scheduled for Mexico City International Airport in Mexico City, where it was due to land at 13:50 local time (19:50 UTC). A total of 112 people were initially believed to be on board, including Mexicans as well as French and American citizens.

All passengers were released after the plane touched down in Mexico City, where it was taken to the emergency apron that is a special area at the end of the airport near the runway 23L. Passengers were seen entering buses as they left the aircraft. Heavily armed security forces surrounded the aircraft as the hijackers and the crew remained on board, according to reporters on scene.

The hijackers, reported as three Bolivian men, demanded to speak with President Calderón. They claimed to be carrying a package with tape and cables, which was said to be an explosive device. The government went into an emergency meeting, in what was being described as a national emergency. At 14:37, most hostages were taken off the plane and evacuated by bus.

== End of hijacking ==
At 14:56 local time, federal police stormed the aircraft and took five men into custody, without having to fire their weapons. The Bolivian Embassy in Mexico City denied its nationals had been involved.

Soon after landing, passengers reported seeing a hijacker who was carrying a package which resembled an explosive device; however, a bomb squad's search of the plane turned up no explosive devices. Televisa reported a controlled explosion of luggage at 16:00.

== Perpetrator ==
Federal Public Security Secretary Genaro García Luna, speaking at a press conference shortly afterwards, identified the individual as José Marc Flores Pereira (aka "Jósmar"), a Bolivian citizen. García Luna also reported that Flores had served prison time in Santa Cruz de la Sierra. While Flores claimed divine guidance for his hijacking action, local media noted that he had a history of drug- and alcohol-related problems. Flores asserted mystical, religious motives for the hijacking, claiming that the date the hijacking took place was 9/9/09, which is the allegedly satanic number 666 upside down. A non-explosive construction consisting of two fruit juice cans, filled with dirt, and adorned with light bulbs was found in his possession.

Quintana Roo State Congressman Hernán Villatoro (of the Labor Party) was on board the flight and said, in a radio interview, that the hijacker was carrying a Bible, issued a series of religious prophecies, and warned that President Calderón should not attend the traditional Independence Day festivities in Mexico City's Zócalo on 16 September because of an impending earthquake.

On 19 May 2011, Flores was sentenced to seven years and seven months in prison for the hijacking. After over a year of appeals, Flores' prison sentence was overturned by an appeals court in September 2012, citing evidence that Flores has mental illness; instead, Flores was moved to a rehabilitation center for treatment. He was released from custody in September, 2014 after a judge ruled that his sentence of four years of psychiatric treatment should begin from the date he was first captured and imprisoned, in 2009, and not from 2012, when he was sentenced.
