= Air West Flight 612 =

2007 aircraft hijacking

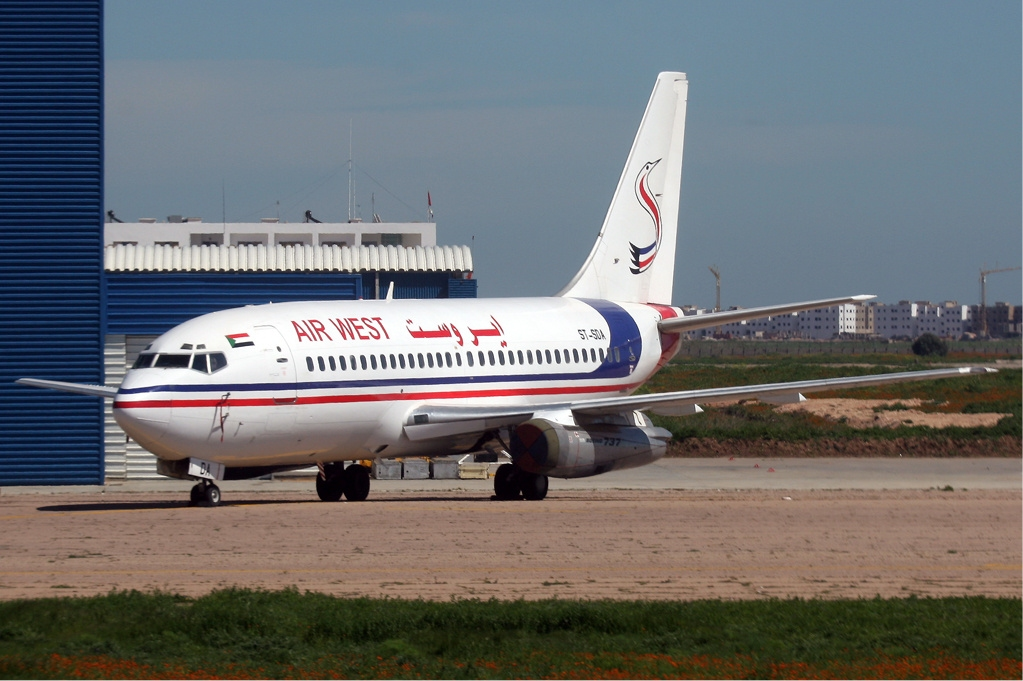
- ST-SDA, the aircraft involved in the hijacking, in 2006

Hijacking
- Date: January 24, 2007
- Summary: Hijacking
- Site: N'Djamena, Chad; 12°6′36″N 15°3′0″E

Aircraft
- Aircraft type: Boeing 737-2T4
- Operator: Air West
- Registration: ST-SDA
- Flight origin: Khartoum International Airport, Khartoum
- Destination: El Fasher Airport, Al-Fashir
- Occupants: 103
- Passengers: 95
- Crew: 8
- Fatalities: 0
- Injuries: 0
- Survivors: 103

Air West Flight 612 was a scheduled domestic passenger flight operated by Air West between Khartoum and Al-Fashir, both in Sudan. On January 24, 2007, with 103 people on board, the flight, operated by a Boeing 737-200, was hijacked shortly after takeoff by a male individual. The plane landed safely at N'Djamena, Chad, where the hijacker surrendered.

== Hijacking ==
On the day of the hijacking the plane had an entirely Sudanese passenger complement, the only exceptions being a British citizen and an Italian military attaché. Mohamed Abdu Altif (also referred to as Mohamed Abdelatif Mahamat), a 26-year-old from Al-Fashir, in North Darfur, entered the cockpit of the aircraft at 09:00 local time (0600 UTC), approximately half an hour after takeoff from Khartoum International Airport. He ordered the pilot to fly to Rome, Italy and then on to London, England. It was originally mistakenly reported that the hijacker's weapon was an AK-47 assault rifle, but subsequent reports stated that the weapon was in fact a handgun.

After the pilot explained that there was not enough fuel on board to reach London, he agreed to fly to Chad. He made no threats or other communication to the passengers, none of whom became aware the aircraft had been hijacked. When the aircraft entered Chadian airspace it was met by French Mirage F-1 fighter jets stationed at N'Djamena, which escorted the plane until it landed at N'Djamena International Airport at 0830 UTC, where it was immediately surrounded by Chadian troops. Twenty minutes of negotiations followed, after which the hijacker allowed all the occupants of the aircraft to leave before surrendering.

== Subsequent events ==
The passengers and crew subsequently re-boarded the aircraft, which then returned to Khartoum International at 22:00 local time (19:00 UTC). The Sudanese Minister of Justice requested that Interpol hand over Muhammed, a Sudanese national, so that he could be charged with terrorism, posing a threat to passenger safety, and illegal possession of arms. Chad further announced an intention to prosecute him.

Chad's infrastructure minister, Adoum Younousmi, later said: "Chad is not a terrorist haven. He is a terrorist and we will take him to court". A Chadian official subsequently identified him as being "close to" the Justice and Equality Movement rebel group. Sudan's Civil Aviation Authority also formed a separate committee specifically to investigate how Muhammed was able to get a weapon through security undetected.

== Motives ==
After Mohammed's arrest, he was taken to the headquarters for the National Security Agency for interrogation. There, he revealed his motives for the hijacking. He wanted to draw attention to the conflict in Darfur, stating: "I wanted to attract national and international opinion to what's happening in Darfur." He said that he wanted to go first to Rome, and then to the United Kingdom to seek asylum. "I'm neither a rebel nor in the opposition, but the Sudanese government is exterminating the population by creating conflicts among different communities and saying that it's just an internal, communal problem," he said.

== See also ==
- Turkish Airlines Flight 1476
