= Lufthansa Flight 592 =

Aircraft hijacking incident

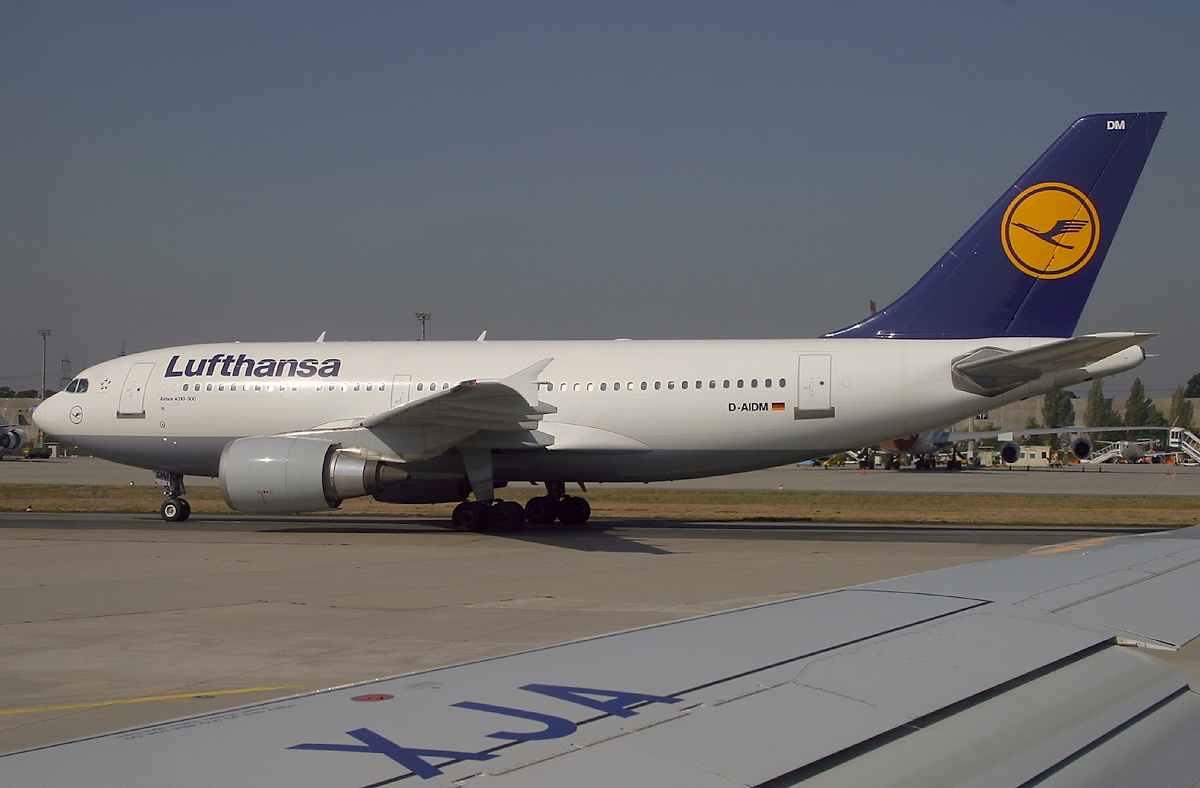
- D-AIDM, the aircraft involved in the hijacking, seen in 2003

Incident
- Date: February 11, 1993
- Summary: Hijacking
- Site: John F. Kennedy International Airport, New York City, US

Aircraft
- Aircraft type: Airbus A310-300
- Operator: Lufthansa
- Registration: D-AIDM
- Flight origin: Frankfurt International Airport, Frankfurt, Germany
- Stopover: Cairo International Airport, Cairo, Egypt
- Destination: Addis Ababa Bole International Airport, Addis Ababa, Ethiopia
- Occupants: 104
- Passengers: 94
- Crew: 10
- Fatalities: 0
- Injuries: 0
- Survivors: 104

Lufthansa Flight 592 was a regularly scheduled passenger flight from Frankfurt, Germany, to Addis Ababa, Ethiopia, that was hijacked on February 11, 1993. The Lufthansa-operated Airbus A310 was hijacked by Nebiu Zewolde Demeke, (Note: Ethiopian names have no surnames: Zewolde is the man's father's name, and Demeke is the man's grandfather's name. He would be politely addressed by his given name "Nebiu". Some newspaper articles from the 1990s refer to him by his grandfather's name, Demeke. The Federal Bureau of Prisons listed him (41973-053) with Demeke treated as the surname.) a 20-year-old Ethiopian man seeking asylum who forced the pilot to fly to New York City. The aircraft landed safely at John F. Kennedy International Airport, and the gunman surrendered peacefully and without incident. He was charged with aircraft hijacking by a United States district court, and was sentenced to 20 years' imprisonment.

== Flight ==
Flight 592 was an international flight operated by Deutsche Lufthansa AG between Frankfurt International Airport, Frankfurt, Germany, and Bole International Airport, Addis Ababa, Ethiopia, with a scheduled intermediate stop at Cairo International Airport, Cairo, Egypt. The aircraft was an Airbus A310-300, registration D-AIDM, that had been in service since August 30, 1991. The flight carried 94 passengers and 10 crew. The captain was Gehard Goebel, and the first officer was Kay Juergens.

== Hijacker ==
Nebiu Zewolde Demeke was born on September 24, 1972, in Egypt. His father, an economist, was a political prisoner in Ethiopia, and his family moved to Morocco after his arrest to escape persecution. Nebiu studied at the American School in Tangiers, Morocco, where he was described as "distracted" and "emotional." His older sister, Selamawit, went to study at Gettysburg College in Gettysburg, Pennsylvania. His older brother, Demter, enrolled at Macalester College in St. Paul, Minnesota, and his younger brother, Brook, lived in Indiana. Though Nebiu attempted to join his siblings in the United States, he was denied a student visa, and was unable to otherwise receive permission to legally enter the country.

Six months prior to the hijacking, Nebiu moved to Germany and applied for political asylum. When he withdrew his application for asylum, the German government purchased him a ticket on Flight 592 back to Ethiopia.

Nebiu entered the airport carrying a starting pistol loaded with blanks. Prior to reaching security, he placed the pistol on his head and covered it with an "Indiana Jones"–style fedora. When it came time to pass through the metal-detector, he pinched the top of the hat and placed both it and the hidden pistol on a table. He retrieved both prior to boarding the plane.

== Hijacking ==
There's a young gentleman on board who does not want to go to Cairo, and he has a gun pointed at my head.

— Pilot Gerhard Goebel, in an announcement to passengers aboard Flight 592.

At Frankfurt Airport, Nebiu took advantage of the airport security by stuffing a pistol deep into his hat and then placing his hat on a table adjacent to the scanner.

Approximately 35 minutes into the flight, as the aircraft reached cruising altitude in Austrian airspace, Nebiu entered the forward lavatory. He put on a black ski mask and removed his pistol. Leaving the lavatory, he entered the cockpit, which was unlocked. Placing the pistol to the pilot's head, he said, "If you do not turn west, I'll shoot you."

Nebiu demanded that the aircraft be flown to New York City and demanded political asylum in the United States. After being told that the plane would need to be refueled, Nebiu agreed to allow a refueling stop in Hanover, Germany. The aircraft landed at Hannover-Langenhagen Airport around noon local time, where it was surrounded by law enforcement officials. Nebiu remained in the cockpit with the pistol to the pilot's head, and threatened to begin killing a flight attendant every five minutes. German authorities allowed the plane to depart after Nebiu threatened to kill his hostages but promised to surrender peacefully upon reaching the United States.

Pilot Gerhard Goebel was able to calm Nebiu down during the non-stop flight to New York. Though Nebiu kept the pistol pointed at Goebel's head for the duration of the flight, he removed his ski mask. Goebel later told newspapers that he spent the hours trying to build a rapport with Nebiu, who admitted to having spent several months planning the hijacking. Both men agreed that, upon arriving in New York, Goebel would give Nebiu his sunglasses in exchange for Nebiu's pistol.

The aircraft arrived at John F. Kennedy International Airport at around 4:00 pm EDT and taxied to a remote part of the runway. A three-man hostage negotiation team had been assembled in the air traffic control tower. NYPD detective Dominick Misino spoke with Nebiu over the radio, assisted by FBI special agent John Flood and Port Authority detective sergeant Carmine Spano. After 70 minutes of negotiation, Nebiu traded his pistol for the pilot's sunglasses and surrendered peacefully to authorities. All 94 passengers and ten crew were unharmed.

== Aftermath ==
Nebiu was arrested and charged with air piracy in the United States District Court for the Eastern District of New York in Brooklyn. He was arraigned on February 12, 1993; Judge Allyne Ross ordered him held without bail until his trial. Nebiu remained convinced that he would not spend any time in prison and that he would be granted asylum. During the course of his trial, he was twice found to be incompetent to stand trial and was prescribed medication for depression and hallucinations. He represented himself during the course of his four-day trial. He was found guilty in a jury trial after an hour of deliberation, and Judge Sterling Johnson, Jr. sentenced him to prison until 2013.

Germany was criticized severely by the international press for lax security measures in Frankfurt Airport that allowed Nebiu to smuggle a pistol on board, and for allowing the hijacked aircraft to leave after refueling in Hanover. Frankfurt Airport, the busiest airport in Europe at the time, had recently come under fire after the bombing of Pan Am Flight 103 over Lockerbie, Scotland, in 1988, when it had been alleged that the explosives had been loaded in Frankfurt. Since the 1988 bombing, the Frankfurt airport had performed numerous security reviews and implemented more stringent security procedures.

The incident was the first trans-Atlantic hijacking since five Croatian nationalists hijacked TWA Flight 355 on September 10, 1976. In that incident, the domestic New York-Chicago flight was forced to fly to Paris, France. It is, as of 2026, the most-recent transatlantic hijacking as well.

In 2012, the hijacking was mentioned on an episode of the TV show Hostage: Do or Die on the episode "The Last Transatlantic Hijacking".

== See also ==
- List of aircraft hijackings
