= Ethiopian Airlines Flight 702 =

2014 aircraft hijacking over Sudan

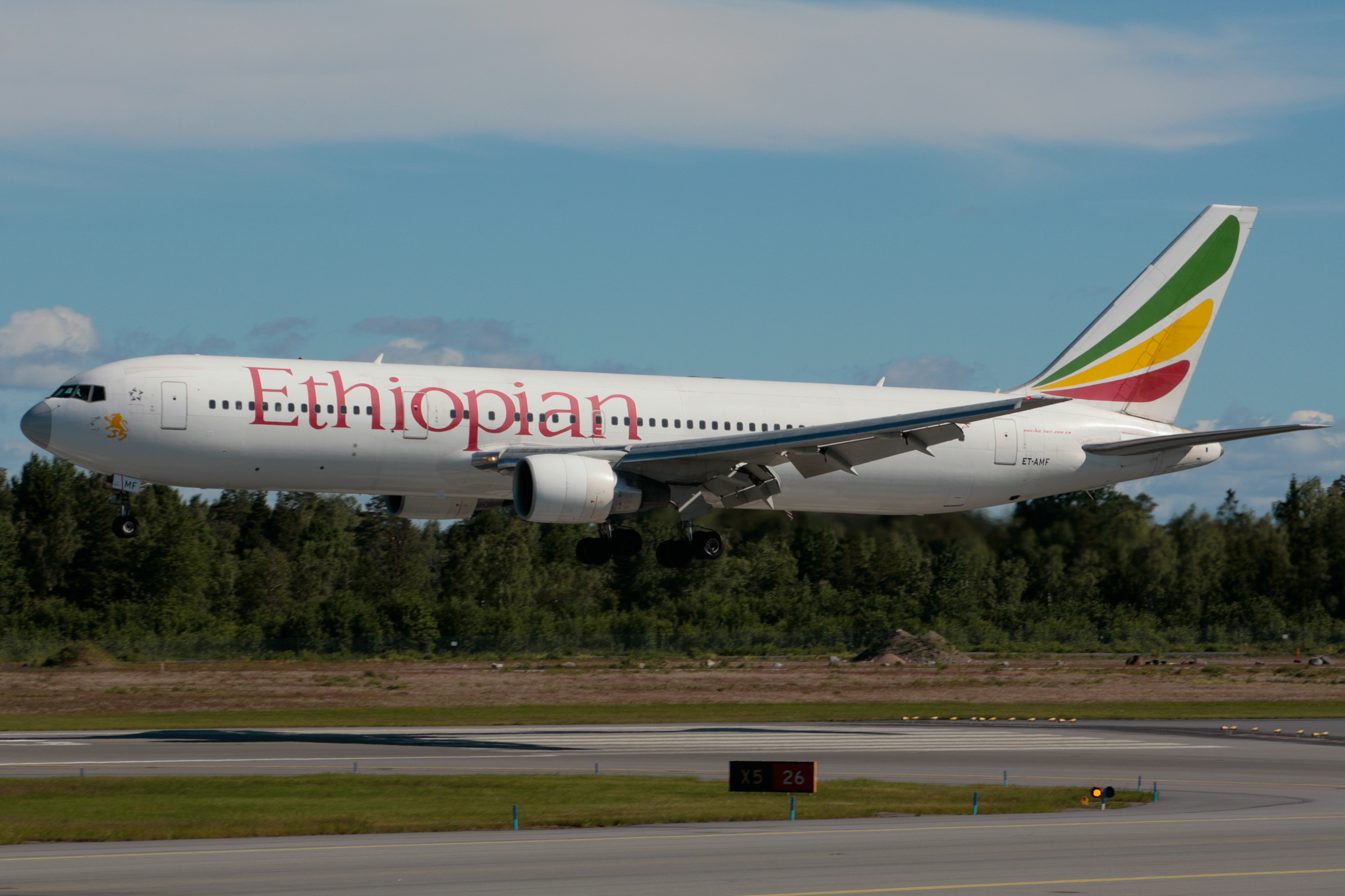
- ET-AMF, the aircraft involved in the hijacking, pictured in June 2014

Hijacking
- Date: 17 February 2014
- Summary: Hijacked by co-pilot
- Site: Hijacked over Sudan, forced to land at Geneva

Aircraft
- Aircraft type: Boeing 767-3BGER
- Operator: Ethiopian Airlines
- IATA flight No.: ET702
- ICAO flight No.: ETH702
- Call sign: ETHIOPIAN 702
- Registration: ET-AMF
- Flight origin: Addis Ababa Bole International Airport, Ethiopia
- Stopover: Leonardo da Vinci–Fiumicino Airport, Italy
- Destination: Malpensa Airport, Italy
- Occupants: 202 (including hijacker)
- Passengers: 193
- Crew: 9 (including hijacker)
- Fatalities: 0
- Survivors: 202 (including hijacker)

Ethiopian Airlines Flight 702 was a scheduled flight from Addis Ababa to Milan via Rome on 17 February 2014. The aircraft, an Ethiopian Airlines Boeing 767, was hijacked by the unarmed co-pilot, Hailemedhin Abera Tegegn, en route from Addis Ababa to Rome.

== Aircraft ==
The aircraft involved was a Boeing 767-3BGER, MSN 30563, registered as ET-AMF, that was built by Boeing Commercial Airplanes in 2000. The aircraft was equipped with two Pratt & Whitney PW4062 engines.

== Incident ==
Flight 702 was scheduled to depart from Addis Ababa Bole International Airport in Addis Ababa, Ethiopia, at 00:30 EAT (UTC+3) on 17 February 2014. The aircraft's transponder began to emit squawk 7500 — the international code for an aircraft hijacking — while flying north over Sudan. When the pilot exited the cockpit to use the restroom, the co-pilot locked the cockpit door and continued to fly the aircraft.

The flight was scheduled to arrive at Leonardo da Vinci–Fiumicino Airport in Rome, Italy, at 04:40 CET (UTC+1), before continuing to Malpensa Airport in Milan, Italy. Instead, the aircraft was flown to Geneva, Switzerland, where the co-pilot circled several times while communicating with air traffic control at Geneva International Airport while trying to negotiate political asylum for himself and an assurance that he would not be extradited to Ethiopia.

At 06:02 CET (UTC+1), the airplane landed at Geneva International Airport with about 10 minutes of fuel remaining, and having suffered the flameout of one engine.

The co-pilot exited the aircraft by scaling down a rope he threw out of the cockpit window before walking over to police; he surrendered after identifying himself as the hijacker, and was taken into custody. The airport was briefly shut down during the incident; no passengers or crew were injured.

The flight was escorted by Italian Eurofighter and French Mirage fighter jets while traversing their respective airspaces. The Swiss Air Force did not respond because the incident occurred outside normal office hours; a Swiss Air Force spokesman stated: "Switzerland cannot intervene because its airbases are closed at night and on the weekend. It's a question of budget and staffing." Switzerland relies on neighboring countries to police its airspace outside of regular business hours; the French and Italian Air Forces have permission to escort suspicious flights into Swiss airspace, but do not have authority to shoot down an aircraft over Switzerland.

== Consequences ==
=== Hijacker ===
The hijacker of Flight 702 was Hailemedhin Abera Tegegn, 31, who was the co-pilot of flight 702.

In May 2014, the Swiss government declined a request by the Ethiopian government to extradite Hailemedhin to Ethiopia. Swiss authorities initially said that Hailemedhin would face trial in Switzerland. However, in November 2015, the Swiss public prosecutor determined that Hailemedhin (who had been detained in Switzerland ever since his arrest) would not be prosecuted after a panel of experts "unanimously decided that [Hailemedhin] was in a state of complete paranoia" during the hijacking and was incapable of rational thinking. Hailemedhin was then set to appear before a Swiss federal court, which would order the pilot to undergo mental health treatment.

In March 2015, the Ethiopian high court in Addis Ababa convicted Hailemedhin in absentia and sentenced him to 19 years and six months in jail.

=== Swiss Air Force ===
The limitations of Switzerland's air defences were made apparent by this incident. Although a proposal to improve coverage was already in motion, the hijacking led to the implementation of a 24-hour readiness organization. From 4 January 2016, a pair of Swiss F/A-18 Hornets were kept at 15 minute QRA readiness between 8.00am and 6.00pm on weekdays. This was increased as of 2 January 2017 to the same hours daily. Since 31 December 2020, the Swiss Air Force maintain a pair of interceptors at 15 minute readiness 24 hours a day for 365 days a year.

== See also ==
- Ethiopian Airlines Flight 961
