= Air West =

Sudanese airline

IATA	ICAO	Call sign
-	AWZ	-
- Founded: April 1992; 33 years ago
- Hubs: Khartoum International Airport
- Fleet size: 7
- Headquarters: Khartoum, Sudan

Air West is an airline based in Khartoum, Sudan. It operates domestic passenger services and international cargo charters. Its main base is Khartoum International Airport, with a hub at Sharjah International Airport.

This airline has no connection to Hughes Airwest which previously operated in the U.S. as Air West.

The airline is on the List of air carriers banned in the European Union.

== History ==
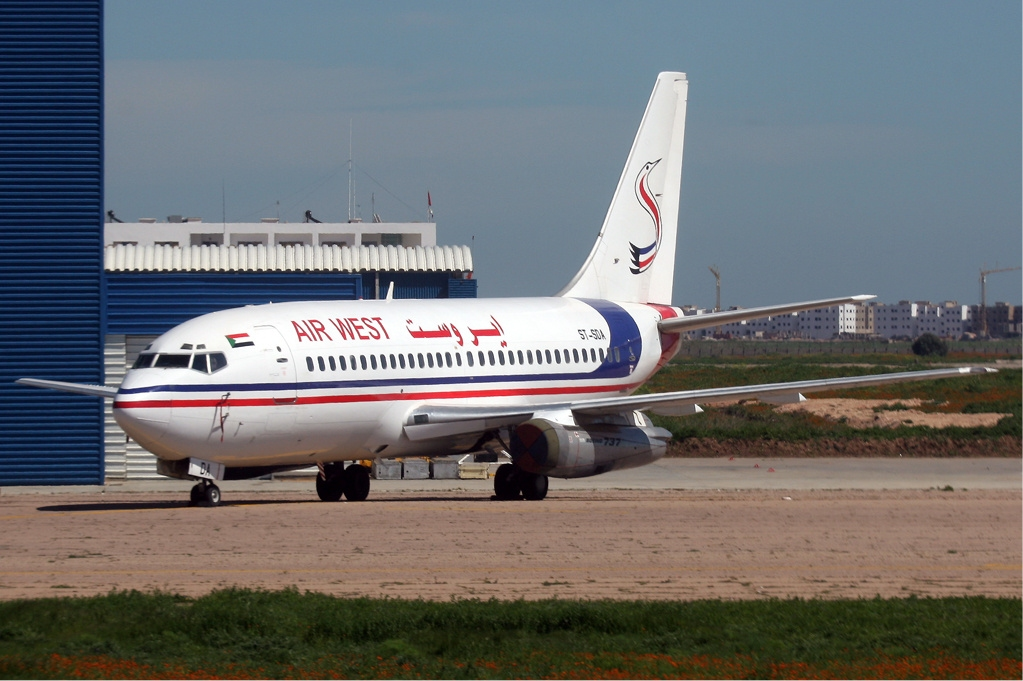
Air West Boeing 737-200 in 2006.

The airline was established in April 1992 and started operations in October 1992.

== Incidents and accidents ==
On January 24, 2007, Air West Flight 612, a Boeing 737 with 95 passengers and 8 crew on board, was hijacked and diverted to the Chadian capital of N'Djamena. The plane, destined for the town of El Fasher, took off from Khartoum at 8:30 AM. Air traffic control had evidence of only one hijacker aboard the plane. The 24-year-old hijacker, Mahamat Abdelatif Mahamat, was armed with a pistol and several knives. He demanded that the airplane be flown to Britain. When he realized that there was not enough fuel to go to Britain he asked to be flown to Bangui or N'Djamena. The aircraft landed safely in N'Djamena and all passengers were released. The hijacker requested guarantees for his safety from the French embassy and requested political asylum in the United Kingdom. The hijacker's demands were not heeded; he was arrested following twenty minutes of negotiations on the ground.

== Destinations ==
Air West does public services to Sudan, Egypt and Saudi Arabia.

== Fleet ==
The Air West fleet consists of the following aircraft (as of 4 April 2018):

- 1 Airbus A300-600 (265)
- 2 Antonov An-24 (44)
- 1 Antonov An-28 (18)
- 1 Boeing 737-300QC (148)
- 2 Fokker 50 (50)

Total:7
