= Turkish Airlines Flight 1476 =

2006 aircraft hijacking

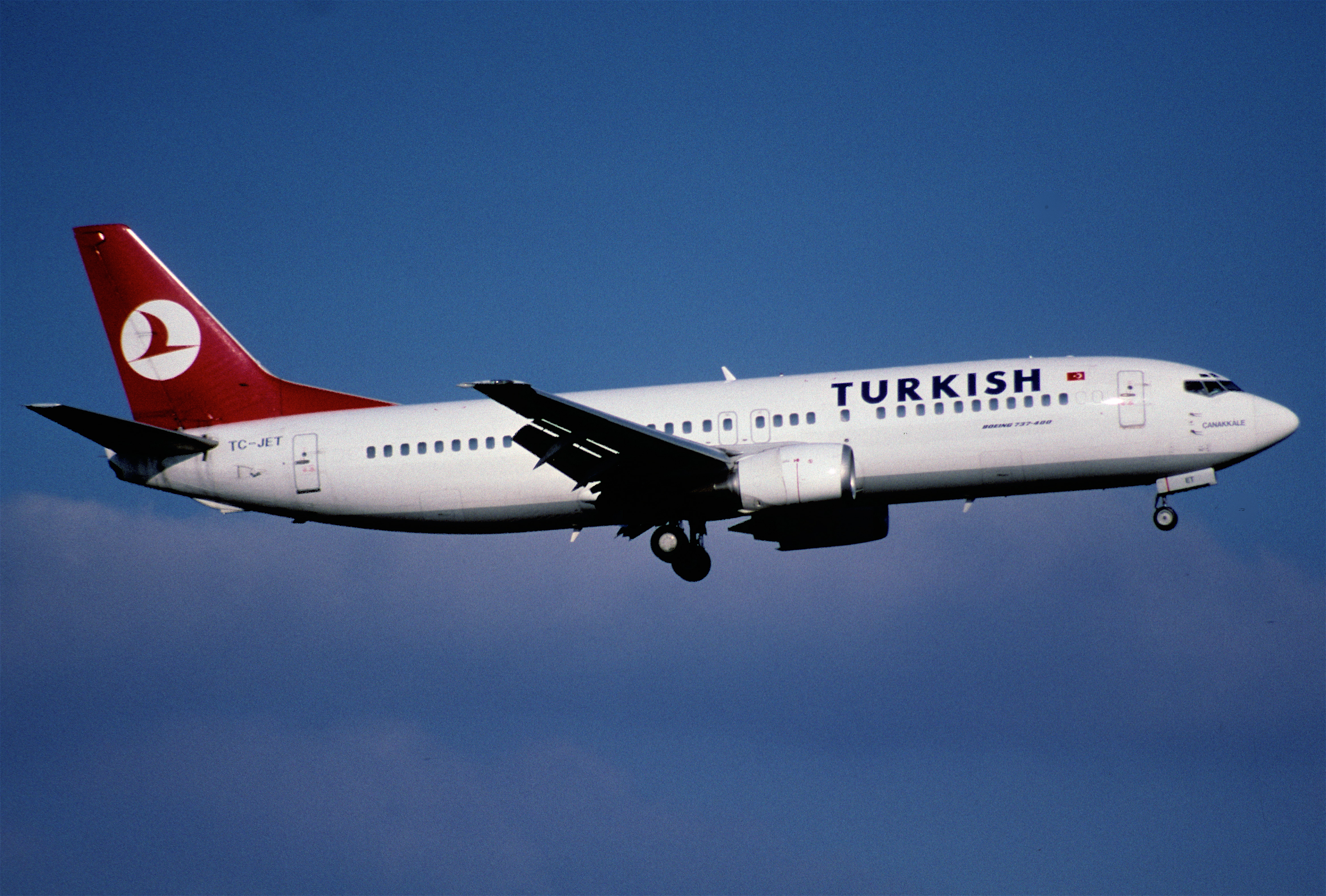
- TC-JET, the aircraft involved in the hijacking, photographed in 2003.

Hijacking
- Date: 3 October 2006
- Summary: Hijacking
- Site: Hijacked in Greek air space, landed at Brindisi Airport in Italy

Aircraft
- Aircraft type: Boeing 737-4Y0
- Operator: Turkish Airlines
- IATA flight No.: TK1476
- ICAO flight No.: THY1476
- Call sign: TURKISH 1476
- Registration: TC-JET
- Flight origin: Tirana International Airport Nënë Tereza
- Destination: Atatürk International Airport
- Occupants: 113
- Passengers: 107 (including hijacker)
- Crew: 6
- Fatalities: 0
- Survivors: 113

Turkish Airlines Flight 1476 (TK1476) was a Turkish Airlines Boeing 737-400 flying from Tirana to Istanbul that was hijacked by Hakan Ekinci in Greek airspace on 3 October 2006. Ekinci demanded to go to Rome to speak with the Pope, but Greek and Italian F-16 Fighting Falcon jets intercepted and escorted the aircraft until it landed in Brindisi, Italy. Nobody was harmed, and Ekinci was jailed in Italy while awaiting trial. At first, the hijacking incident was linked with the envisaged visit of Pope Benedict XVI to Turkey, but later, it was ascertained that Ekinci was seeking to request political asylum from Italy. On 4 October, a Turkish Airlines plane was sent to take the other passengers to Istanbul.

== Hijacking ==
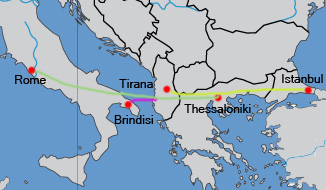
Planned route from Tirana to Istanbul of the plane is shown with yellow, green is the demanded route from Thessaloniki to Rome by the hijacker, and purple is the actual route to Brindisi.

On 3 October 2006, the Boeing 737-4Y0 took off from Tirana bound for Istanbul. It was hijacked by Hakan Ekinci in Greek airspace at 14:58 UTC and was intercepted and forced by Italian F-16 Fighting Falcon interceptor jets to land at the southern Italian Adriatic port city of Brindisi. There were 113 people on board: 107 passengers and six crew members. At first, it was reported that there were two hijackers, but later, it was confirmed that the sole hijacker lied about the existence of an accomplice.

An official from Greek Ministry of National Defence said the plane had entered Greek air space at 14:58 (UTC). The pilots transmitted the hijack squawk code twice at 14:55 (UTC), while the aircraft was cruising about 25 kilometres (15 mi) north of Thessaloniki. Italian Interior Minister Giuliano Amato reported that the hijacker slipped into the cockpit with a package which could have been a bomb when flight attendants opened the cockpit door, and the pilots acted according to the international rules in the matter and did what the hijacker wanted. The flight's captain reported in Istanbul that "while the chief stewardess entered the cockpit to ask if we needed anything, the terrorist entered by force. I tried to push him out but he was a big man and I failed to stop him". The captain went on to say that the hijacker said he had three friends and they had explosives. He wanted to go Rome to speak with the Pope, and Italian Minister of the Interior Giuliano Amato reported that, the hijacker added there are other hijackers on another unspecified plane, "would blow that plane up if the missive didn't get to the pope". Four Greek F-16 fighter jets took off and accompanied the plane until it left Greek airspace. Once in Italian airspace, two Italian F-16s intercepted, escorted, and forced it to land in Brindisi Airport in Brindisi. The airline spokesman said that Greek officials had alerted their Italian counterparts about the hijacking incident.

== Passenger accounts ==
Passengers said that the hijacker used no violence. Sabri Abazi, an Albanian member of parliament, who was a passenger on the flight, spoke to ANSA news agency by mobile phone on board. Abazi said that there was one hijacker in the cockpit and another in the cabin, and added that he saw no weapons. Passenger Ergün Erköseoğlu said "I didn't see any suspicious behaviour of the hijacker. Airplane took off and after 20 minutes later, captain announced that due to technical malfunction we would land in Italy instead of Istanbul". Aviation authorities said that after all the passengers had left the plane, police questioned the hijacker. Abazi said that he saw only one hijacker but had been told by a flight attendant that there were two hijackers on board. Istanbul Governor Muammer Güler reported that the hijacker Ekinci lied to the airliner's pilots that he had at least one accomplice.

== Upon landing ==
Italian police, military, and fire brigade vehicles surrounded the plane and the Italian news agency ANSA reported that police detained both hijackers. Brindisi Police Chief, Salvatore De Paolis, told Reuters "they will request political asylum". In an interview with reporters, a fire rescue official said "The two hijackers want to speak to journalists so they can send a message to the Pope and explain why they did this." Amoto reported that the hijacker wanted to deliver a message for Pope Benedict XVI, but stated he did not have a written letter.

Hijacker Hakan Ekinci's protest took six hours, and after his surrender, the hijacker apologized to the captain and shook his hand; he also apologized to the passengers. CNN Türk reported that there were 107 passengers, 80 of them Albanian and five Turkish.

After the incident, a Tirana airport video was released to Reuters showing Ekinci being checked by security. He was body searched and passed through a metal detector, then removed his belt, sweater, and emptied his pockets, but was cleared to proceed to his flight.

Ekinci was arrested in Italy after interrogation. Turkish Minister of Justice Cemil Çiçek reported that there would not be a direct return request to the Italian Ministry of Justice until the Chief Public Prosecutor's Office and Ministry of Internal Affairs had completed their work on the subject. They then requested the return of Ekinci. Giuseppe Giannuzzi, prosecutor of the hijacking incident, said to The Associated Press in an interview that the hijacker would remain in jail until the end of the trial which would presumably take two years after inception. Giannuzzi charged Ekinci with hijacking and considered other charges like terrorism and kidnapping. Ekinci was sentenced to 3 years and 4 months for hijacking, and was released on September 14, 2009.

== Possible motives ==
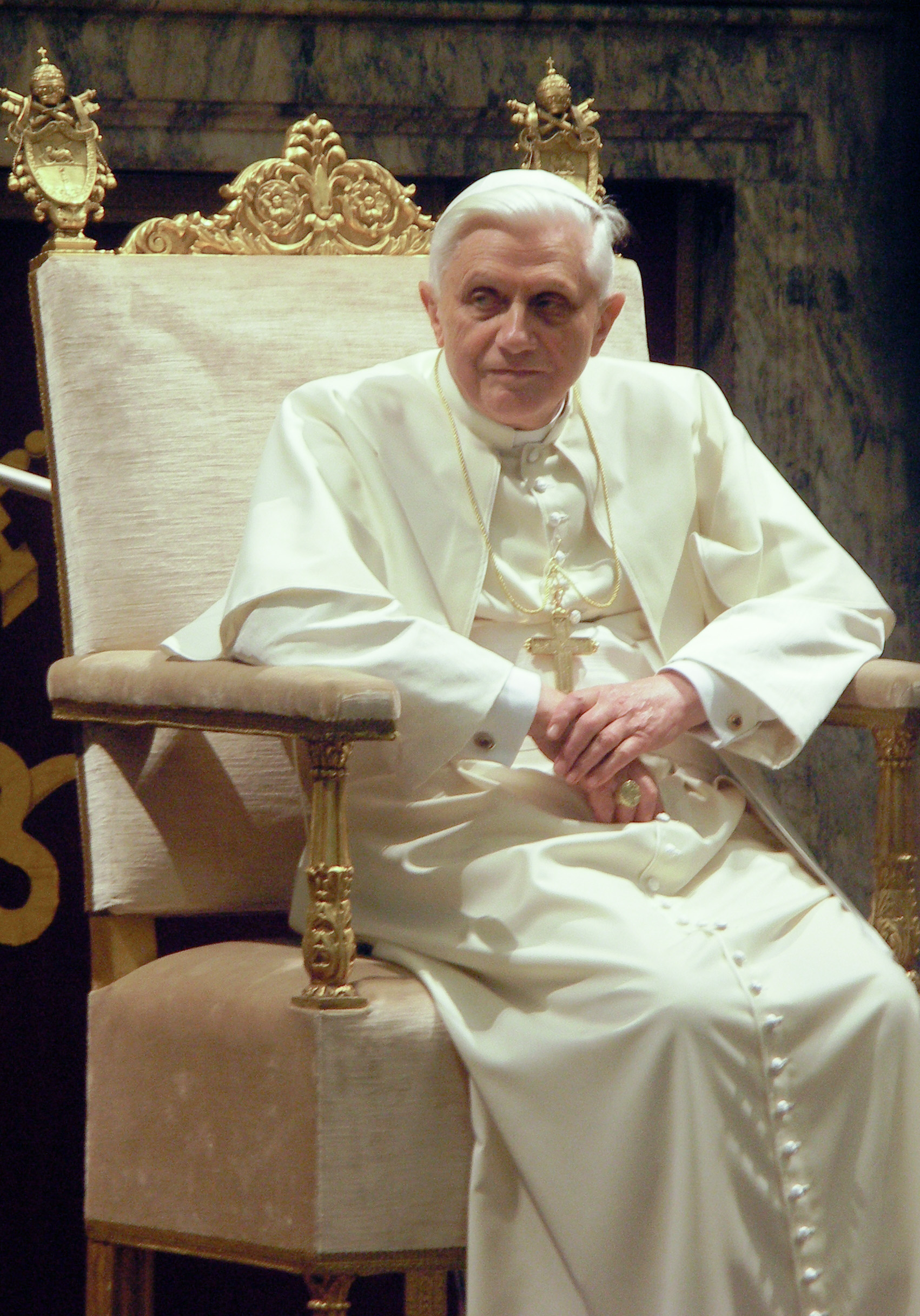
At first, the hijacking was linked with Benedict XVI's envisaged visit, but later it was ascertained that Ekinci wanted to give a letter to the Pope.

Several theories have emerged as to the motives for the hijacking. At first, Turkish media reported police sources as saying the hijacking was in protest against the then envisaged visit of Pope Benedict XVI, who had offended many Muslims with a speech linking the spread of the Islamic faith to violence. But later, it was reported that the hijacker sought political asylum in Italy due to his conscientious objection to serving in the military.

At first, Turkish media reported that there were two hijackers, Hakan Ekinci and Mehmet Ertaş, but later it was ascertained that Ekinci was alone and Ertaş was innocent. According to the report of Turkey's Ministry of Justice, first information about hijacking incident were retrieved via Interpol and authorities reported Ertaş's name as hijacker based on Interpol's report but after more investigations it was ascertained that Ertaş was innocent.

Turkish officials reported the hijacker's name as Hakan Ekinci, born in 1978 in Buca, who is known to have written a letter to the Pope in August 2006. He wrote, "I am a Christian and don't want to serve a Muslim army". He also wrote that he had been attending church since 1998. Istanbul Governor Muammer Güler reported that, Ekinci, who has been identified as a Christian convert by the Turkish media and by chief prosecutor Giuseppe Giannuzzi's reporting near Lecce, is a conscientious objector Catholic and has dodged his military conscription. He left Istanbul on 6 May 2006 and went to Albania. Turkey's Consulate General in Tirana then filed for his deportation. If he had landed in Turkey, Hakan Ekinci was certain to be interned as a draft-dodger, since the Consulate had reported the order for his deportation to the police at Atatürk International Airport. Authorities had been investigating him since 1 September on the draft-dodging charge.

Pope Benedict XVI visited Ankara, Istanbul, and Ephesus as a guest of the Turkish President Ahmet Necdet Sezer between 28 November and 1 December 2006. Vatican City officials reported that the Pope was informed of the hijacking incident but the preparations for his trip would not be affected.

== Passengers' compensation flight ==
Although the hijacker was found to have acted alone, Italian police took statements from passengers and searched the aircraft and baggage for a possible accomplice, and due to this process, passengers stayed in Italy during the night. On 4 October, a Turkish Airlines Boeing 737 was sent from Turkey to bring the passengers back to Istanbul. The plane departed from Brindisi Airport at 4:15 (UTC) and landed in Istanbul at 5:40 (UTC) with 105 passengers, with the exception of the hijacker who had been arrested in Brindisi, and a passenger who wanted to remain in Italy.
