= Indian Airlines Flight 405 =

1984 aircraft hijacking

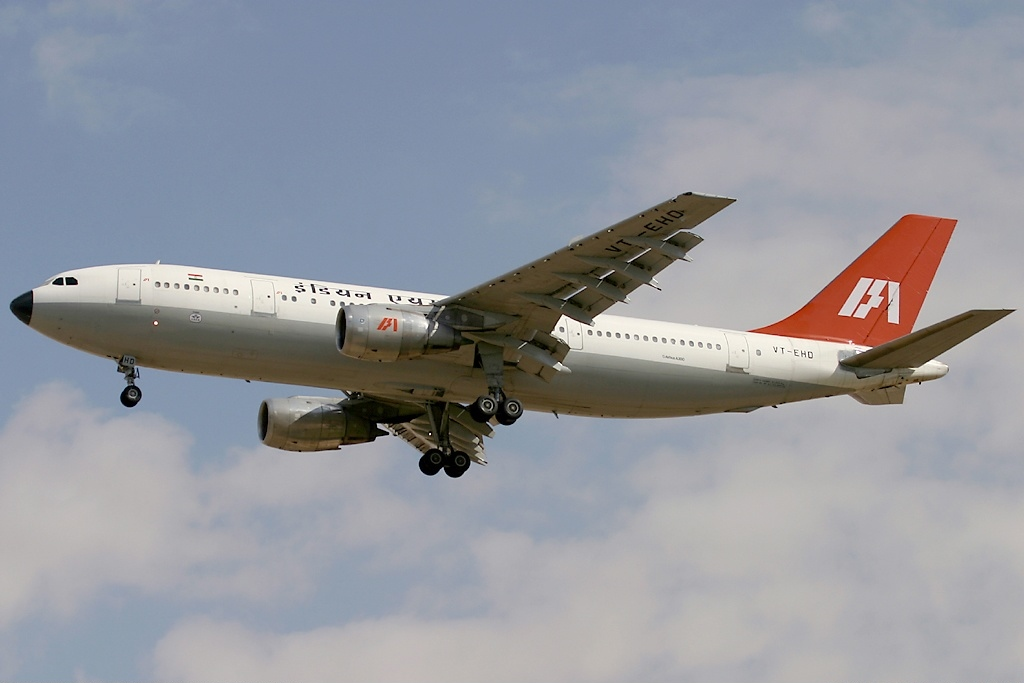
- An Indian Airlines A300, similar to the aircraft involved in the hijack

Hijacking
- Date: 5 July 1984
- Summary: Terrorist hijacking
- Site: Lahore Airport, Punjab, Pakistan; 31°31′17″N 74°24′12″E

Aircraft
- Aircraft type: Airbus A300
- Operator: Indian Airlines
- IATA flight No.: IC405
- ICAO flight No.: IAC405
- Call sign: INDAIR 405
- Registration: Unknown
- Flight origin: Srinagar Airport, Budgam, India
- Destination: Palam Airport, Palam, Delhi, India
- Occupants: 264 (including 9 hijackers)
- Passengers: 254
- Crew: 10
- Fatalities: 0
- Survivors: 264

On 5 July 1984, nine hijackers forced Indian Airlines Flight 405, an Airbus A300 on a domestic flight from Srinagar Airport to the Delhi-Palam Airport with 254 passengers and 10 crew on board, to be flown to Lahore Airport in Pakistan.

The hijackers were armed with guns, daggers and a fake bomb. Their demands included the release of prisoners (all Sikhs arrested during Operation Blue Star), US$25 million for damage done during the Operation, and the return of items alleged to be stolen from the Golden Temple during the Operation. The demands of the hijackers were not met and they ultimately surrendered to Pakistani authorities on July 6.

The Press Trust of India quoted the hijackers as saying "Long Live Khalistan". It was related to the secessionist struggle in the Indian state of Punjab, where Khalistani separatists were active. They demanded a separate country for Sikhs.

== Hijackers ==
=== Parminder Singh Saini ===
Parminder Singh Saini was part of the Khalistan movement, a radical Sikh separatist movement in the Indian state of Punjab and hijacked the Indian Airlines Flight 405 that was flying from Srinagar to New Delhi, forcing it to reroute to Lahore in 1984. At his trial in Pakistan, he was sentenced to death, but was released after ten years.

He immigrated to Canada under a false name (Balbir Singh). After entering and completing his law school education in Canada, Saini sought admission to practice as a lawyer. The application was refused, in part because of the serious and heinous nature of Saini's crime, but also because of a lack of candour on his part.

He fought deportation when his true identity was discovered, and stayed in Canada for 15 years, before he was deported in 2010. Saini sought to return to Canada in 2011. His most recent application to the Federal Court of Canada was denied as well.

== See also ==
- List of hijackings of Indian aeroplanes#1980s
- List of aircraft hijackings#1980s
- List of accidents and incidents involving airliners by location#India
- List of accidents and incidents involving airliners by airline (D–O)#I
- List of accidents and incidents involving commercial aircraft#1984
