= Flight 421 =

Flight 421 may refer to:

- Northwest Airlines Flight 421, crashed on 29 August 1948
- Indian Airlines Flight 421, hijacked on 24 August 1984
- Garuda Indonesia Flight 421, ditched on 16 January 2002
