= Flight 427 =

Flight Number 427 may refer to:

- USAir Flight 427 (1994), crashed on approach of Pittsburgh International Airport, killing 132.
- TWA Flight 427 (1994), struck a Cessna 441 during takeoff, killing 2.
- Indian Airlines Flight 427, about an aircraft hijacking that took place in India between 24 and 25 April 1993
