= 1976 Indian Airlines hijacking =

Domestic passenger flight hijacking

Indian Airlines Flight
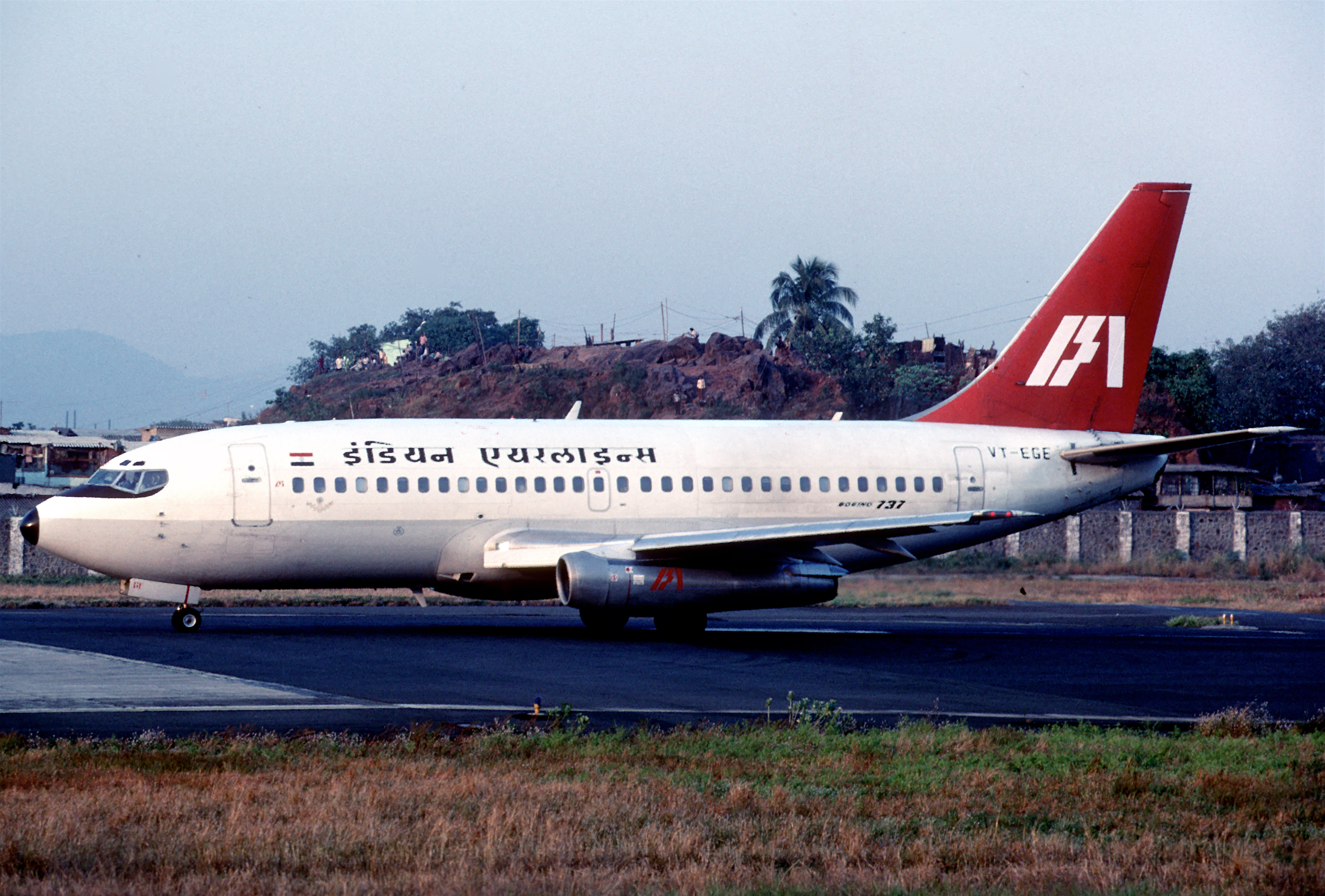
- An Indian Airlines Boeing 737-200, the model of the hijacked aircraft.

Hijacking
- Date: 10 September 1976
- Summary: Aircraft hijacking
- Site: Palam Airport, Delhi, India

Aircraft
- Aircraft type: Boeing 737-200
- Operator: Indian Airlines
- Registration: Unknown
- Flight origin: Palam Airport, Delhi, India
- Destination: Santacruz Airport, Bombay, India
- Occupants: 83
- Passengers: 77
- Crew: 6
- Fatalities: 0
- Survivors: 83

The 1976 Indian Airlines hijacking was a domestic passenger flight hijacking by a group of six terrorists on 10 September 1976. The flight was from Palam Airport, Delhi to Santacruz Airport, Mumbai. The terrorists were later identified to be Kashmiri separatists. Their names were Syed Abdul Hameed Dewani, Syed M Rafique, M. Ahsan Rathore, Abdul Rashid Malik, Ghulam Rasool, and Khawaja Ghulam Nabi Itoo.

== Timeline ==
The original flight path was Delhi to Mumbai. Initially ordered to fly the plane to Libya, after knowing that there wasn't enough fuel for that journey, the leader of the terrorists told the pilot Captain B.N Reddy to take the flight to Karachi, Pakistan instead.

To refuel the plane, they landed in the CAA Lahore airport in Pakistan. All the passengers and crew on board were returned to India the next day, after diplomatic relations between India and Pakistan were re-established and Pakistan helped with the rescue operations.

The hijackers were tricked during breakfast on the plane. They were served colorless tranquilizers with water, leading to the apprehension of all six of the hijackers. Afterwards, the plane was sent back to India with 83 passengers on board.

== Aftermath ==
The terrorists were later released in Pakistan citing "lack of evidence".

Repercussions on the Indian side led to the suspension of 11 members of the security staff and a promise by the Ministry of Tourism and Civil Aviation, Raj Bahadur, to order a detailed and "thorough inquiry" into the event "and into the security arrangements at the airport".

== See also ==
- Timeline of Hijacking of Indian Airplanes
