= Indian Airlines Flight 410 =

1978 politically-motivated plane hijacking in India

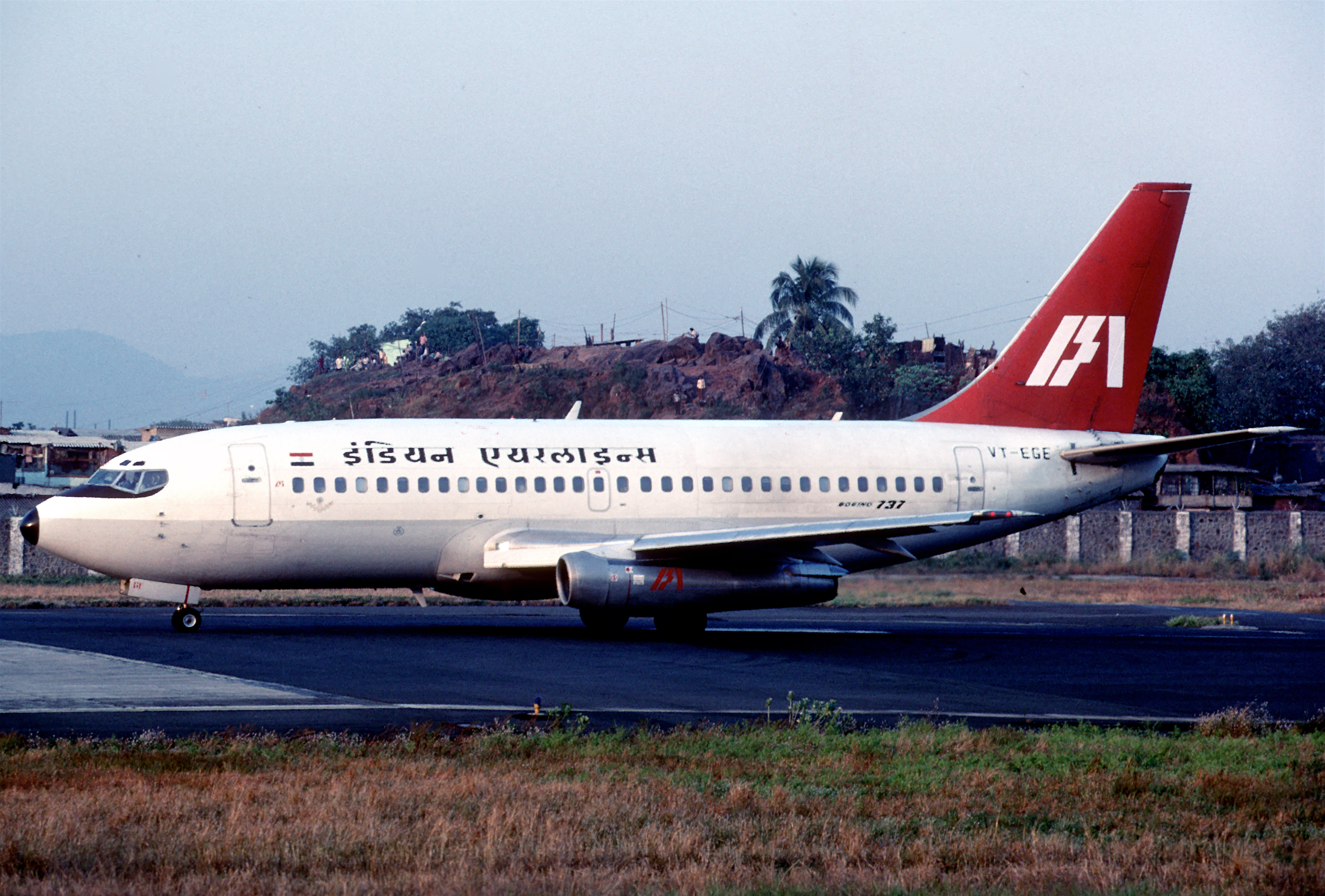
- An Indian Airlines Boeing 737-200, the model of the hijacked aircraft.

Hijacking
- Date: 20 December 1978
- Summary: Aircraft hijacking
- Site: Varanasi Airport, Uttar Pradesh, India; 25°27′08″N 082°51′34″E

Aircraft
- Aircraft type: Boeing 737-200
- Operator: Indian Airlines
- IATA flight No.: IC410
- Registration: Unknown
- Flight origin: Calcutta Airport
- Stopover: Amausi Airport
- Destination: Palam Airport
- Occupants: 132
- Passengers: 126
- Crew: 6
- Fatalities: 0
- Survivors: 132

Indian Airlines Flight 410 was a domestic passenger flight from Calcutta to Palam Airport, Delhi, India. On 20 December 1978, the flight was hijacked by two future members of the Uttar Pradesh Legislative Assembly—Bholanath Pandey and Devendra Pandey— (Note: The two hijackers were not related)shortly before landing at Palam Airport. The hijackers claimed to be members of the Indian Youth Congress, and demanded the release of Indira Gandhi, withdrawal of the charges against her son Sanjay Gandhi, and the resignation of the Janata Party government. The hijackers surrendered shortly after 60 passengers managed to escape.

The prosecution against the two hijackers was dropped after Indira Gandhi and her party returned to government in 1980. Bholanath Pandey and Devendra Pandey then went on to serve as members of the legislative assembly of Uttar Pradesh.

== Timeline ==
On 20 December 1978, the aircraft (a Boeing 737-200) was hijacked shortly before landing at Palam Airport by Bholanath Pandey and Devendra Pandey, who were armed with a toy gun and a cricket ball. The hijackers initially ordered the pilots to fly the plane to Nepal, which the pilots refused due to a shortage of fuel. The hijackers then ordered the pilots to fly to Bangladesh, which the pilots also refused. The hijackers then settled for Varanasi Airport in Uttar Pradesh, India.

The hijackers made speeches over the plane intercom informing passengers that the plane had been hijacked and that the passengers would not be harmed. The hijackers claimed to be members of the Indian Youth Congress; a claim that the Congress later denied.

Upon landing in Varanasi, the hijackers used the plane's radio to announce their demands to the authorities. Their main demands were the release of Indira Gandhi (who had been arrested after the Emergency), the withdrawal of all the cases against her son Sanjay Gandhi, and the resignation of the Janata Party government.

Negotiations commenced early in the morning of 21 December 1978, after a charter flight, carrying Ram Naresh Yadav, the Chief Minister of Uttar Pradesh, the Inspector General of the Police and the Chief Secretary, landed at the airport at 1:00am. The negotiations continued for several hours, whilst the hijackers kept the 130 passengers and crew hostage within the plane. One passenger reportedly managed to escape undetected during this time.

At around 6:00am, in response to passenger complaints about the stuffy air in the plane, the hijackers allowed the passengers to open the rear fuselage doors. This deployed the evacuation slide, which allowed 60 passengers to escape. The hijackers surrendered shortly afterwards.

== Aftermath ==
After Indira Gandhi and her party returned to government in the 1980 Indian general election, the prosecution against the two hijackers were dropped. The Indian National Congress party rewarded them with party tickets for the 1980 state assembly election. Both won the election and became members of the legislative assembly of Uttar Pradesh. Bholanath Pandey served as a Congress MLA from 1980 to 1985, and from 1989 to 1991, and Devendra Pandey remained a member of the house for two terms.{Citation needed|date=February 2024}

== See also ==
- List of hijackings of Indian aeroplanes - 1970s
- List of aircraft hijackings - 1970s
- List of accidents and incidents involving airliners by location - India
- List of accidents and incidents involving airliners by airline (D–O)
- List of accidents and incidents involving commercial aircraft - 1978
