= Devendra Pandey =

Indian politician and plane hijacker

Member of Legislative Assembly
- In office 1980 to 1985; 1985 to 1989
- Constituency: Jaisinghpur

General Secretary of the Uttar Pradesh Congress Committee

Personal details
- Died: 23 September 2017 Gomti Nagar, Lucknow, India
- Party: Indian National Congress

Devendra Pandey was an Indian politician affiliated with the Indian National Congress, who was a Member of Legislative Assembly (MLA) twice from Jaisinghpur Legislative Assembly from 1980 to 1985 and 1985 to 1989. He also served as the Uttar Pradesh State General Secretary of the Indian National Congress. He died on 23 September 2017 at the age of 67.

In 1978 Pandey along with Bholanath Pandey hijacked Indian Airlines Flight 410, en-route on a domestic flight from Calcutta to Delhi with a toy gun to protest the arrest of Indira Gandhi. He was imprisoned in Lucknow jail for nine months and 28 days. Later, when the Congress government came to power, on the instructions of the then Prime Minister Indira Gandhi, the government withdrew the case against him in 1980. Pandey was close to Indira Gandhi and Rajiv Gandhi.

After the death of Indira Gandhi, Rajiv Gandhi gave the assembly ticket to Devendra Pandey in 1985 and 1989. In 1985 Devendra won, and in 1989 he lost the election.

== Posts held ==
#	From	To	Position
01	1980	1985	Member, Uttar Pradesh Legislative Assembly
02	1985	1989	Member, Uttar Pradesh Legislative Assembly
03	−	−	General Secretary, Uttar Pradesh Congress Committee

== See also ==
- Indian Airlines Flight 410
- List of hijackings of Indian aeroplanes
