= Dal Khalsa (organization) =

Radical Sikh outfit

- Formation: 13 April 1978 (48 years ago)
- Founder: Gajinder Singh
- Type: Sikh nationalism
- Headquarters: Amritsar, Punjab, India
- Region served: Worldwide
- Official language: Punjabi
- President: Paramjit Singh Mand
- Key people: Kanwarpal Singh

Dal Khalsa is a radical Sikh organisation, based in the city of Amritsar in the state of Punjab. The outfit was formed in 1978 by Gajinder Singh, the leader of the hijackers of Indian Airlines Flight 423. It came to prominence during Insurgency in Punjab along with Jarnail Singh Bhindranwale in 1981. Members of the Dal Khalsa have also been accused of the assassination of journalist Lala Jagat Narain. The primary aim of Dal Khalsa is to form a Punjabi Sikh nation state called Khalistan.

== History ==
=== Origin ===
On 13 April 1978, the members and leaders of the Sant Nirankari Mission (regarded by orthodox sikh as heretics) held a convention at the Golden Temple. Opposed to this mission, Damdami Taksal and Akhand Kirtani Jatha formed a procession to protest the convention. Soon a clash broke out between the two sides in which 2 Nirankaris and 13 orthodox Sikhs were killed. This clash was termed the 1978 Sikh–Nirankari clash.

Dal Khalsa (DK) was founded in the immediate aftermath of this incident by Gajinder Singh at a convention held at a Gurdwara in Chandigarh with the objective of establishing an independent Sikh state called Khalistan, governed by Sikh religious laws.

Noted journalist Mark Tully in his book claimed that Sanjay Gandhi and Giani Zail Singh were instrumental in the formation of DK in order to promote Bhinderawale and to harass Akalis.

At its first annual conference held in Gurdaspur in December 1979, the DK, with the support of All India Sikh Students Federation, passed a resolution demanding that Amritsar be officially declared a "holy city". This was later taken up with the Indian government by the SGPC in 1980 but the demand was rejected by the government. Sikh Students Federation organised a procession on 31 May 1981 which was opposed by a Hindu procession.

On 1 August 1981, DK Activists raised the Khalistan Flag at the location of the 1978 Sikh-Nirankari clash. The flag was also raised at various places in the Punjab state during India's Independence Day on 15 August 1981.

During 1981 the DK along with other Sikh organisations such as the Sikh Students Federation, SGPC and Shiromani Akali Dal demanded associate membership in the United Nations for the 'Sikh Nation'.

=== Militancy and Ban ===
A 10-year ban was put on the DK by the Indian government in 1982 following militant activities carried out by the organization.

These included the hijacking of the Indian Airlines Flight 423 on 29 September 1981. The plane was hijacked by five members of the DK including the founder Gajinder Singh. The hijackers forced the plane to land in Lahore and demanded 500,000 USD random and the release of Khalistani militant Jarnail Singh Bhindranwale. Pakistani authorities were able to convince the release of most of the passengers and eventually Pakistani military conducted a commando operation to apprehend the hijackers and free the captives. Even though General Zia Ul-Haq promised full cooperation to the Indian authorities, the hijackers were never extradited to India. The hijackers were identified as Gajinder Singh, Satnam Singh of Paonta Sahib, Jasbir Singh of Ropar, Tejinderpal Singh of Jalandhar and Karam Singh of Jammu.

The DK and National Council of Khalistan were banned by the Indian government in May, 1982 after which the DK went underground. Two years later, the DK announced its "Government in Exile" in June, 1984.

== Revival of Dal Khalsa ==
The ban imposed on DK was lifted in 1992. The leader of the organisation, Gajinder Singh continued to reside in Pakistan even after this lift of the ban. In 1996, Gajinder Singh tried to escape to Germany but he was deported back to Pakistan. Since the lifting of the ban, DK has openly operated in India.

On 30 September 2005, Gajinder Singh stepped down as chairman of the organisation with Satnam Singh Paonta, one of the co-founders, chosen as his successor.

In June 2005, the DK became a constituent member of the Punjab Rights Forum.

Currently Harcharanjit Singh Dhami is the president of DK, and Kanwarpal Singh is the secretary general.

In February 2007 the DK broke from its earlier stance regarding participation in Indian politics by supporting two candidates in the Punjab polls, most notably SGPC member Karnail Singh Panjoli. During the Punjab legislative assembly elections the DK also supported candidates from the Shiromani Akali Dal (Amritsar) led by Simranjit Singh Mann.

== Recent activity ==
In September, 2008, DK named the expatriate Sikh leader Manmohan Singh vice president. Singh had already been placed on an Indian government blacklist for past militant activities.

On 3 November 2009, marking 25 years of the 1984 anti-Sikh riots following the assassination of then PM Indira Gandhi, DK called for a Bandh.

In November 2009, Kanwarpal Singh and other noted Sikh representatives from various organizations, under the leadership of Justice (retd) Ajit Singh Bains met Shalini Dewan, the director of United Nations Information Centre at New Delhi and urged the UN to intervene in getting justice for victims of 1984 incident.

In January 2010, DK along with other separatist organisations in India, namely the National Socialist Council of Nagaland and All Parties Hurriyat Conference of Jammu Kashmir came together to demand "early solution to the impasse" of Kashmir, Nagaland and Punjab. On 26 January 2010, DK wrote a letter to prime minister Manmohan Singh highlighting constitutional and legal discriminations faced by Sikhs in India. It demanded that Indian state should immediately abrogate Article 25 (2)(b) of the Indian constitution as it violates the fundamental recognition of Sikhs as a separate religion. On 12 May 2010, the important day of victory of Banda Singh Bahadur, DK participated in parades where flags of Khalistan was unfurled pictures and slogans of Sikh militants were openly displayed.

In 2015, DK demanded opening of Cow-Slaughterhouses in Punjab and also questioned Beef-Ban in Jammu and Kashmir.

In September 2015, DK and Shiromani Akali Dal (Panch Pardani) merged into a single entity by signing a Memorandum of Understanding (MoU) with the main aim to achieve a separate Sikh home land.

=== Nanakshahi calendar ===
On 14 March 2010 DK commemorated 227th anniversary of the historic event when Sikh warrior Baba Baghel Singh, unfurled Nishan Sahib atop the historic Red Fort in 1783. At a well-attended convention at a village gurdwara built in memory of Baba Baghel Singh, DK rejected the amended version of the SGPC Nanakshahi Calendar which went back to the original Sikh calendar with Bikrami dates (moon dates). They released the Nanakshahi calendar (Mool Nanakshahi Calendar) created by SGPC sponsored Sikh scholar Pal Singh Purewal. The calendar has been dedicated to the great Sikh warrior Baba Baghel Singh.

DK spokesperson Kanwarpal Singh rued that the SGPC has killed the letter and spirit of Nanakshahi calendar by mixing it with Bikrami calendar, which had its roots in Hinduism. "We had mentioned dates of Gurpurabs [Sikh religious days] according to original calendar adopted in April 2003 as we believe that the amended version has an imprint of RSS ideology," Singh said. In 2022 DK launched a restored version of the Nanakshahi calendar.

=== Sit-in and hunger strike ===
DK party activists held 72 hours sit-in protest at outside the main entrance gate of Darbar Sahib Complex from 3 June to 6,2010.

=== March 2023 controversy ===
On March 23, 2023, news reports showed Gurcharan Singh, a leader from Dal Khalsa UK, giving a controversial speech while addressing a group of protestors near the High Commission of India in London. A part of his speech in Punjabi translated to: "Bhagat Singh was a bootlicker and a traitor who showed the Sikh community as terrorists. He should not be called a great martyr (Shaheed-e-azam)."

=== Death of Gajinder Singh ===
Gajinder Singh, the founder of the organization, died due to a heart attack in July 2024 in Pakistan.
