= Indian Airlines Flight 423 =

1981 aircraft hijacking

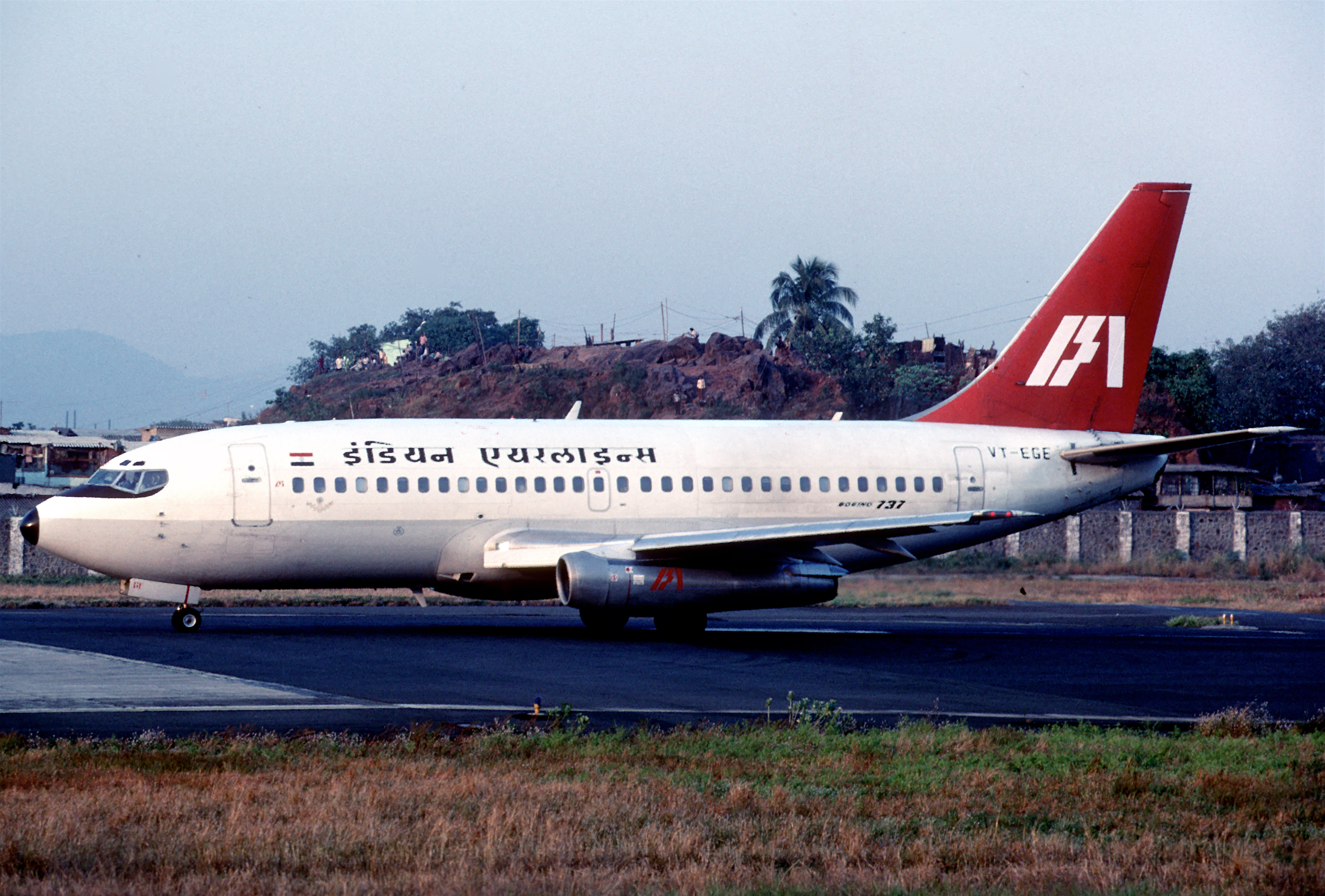
- An Indian Airlines Boeing 737-200, similar to the aircraft involved in the hijack

Hijacking
- Date: 29 September 1981
- Summary: Terrorist hijacking
- Site: Lahore Airport, Punjab, Pakistan; 31°31′17″N 74°24′12″E

Aircraft
- Aircraft type: Boeing 737-2A8
- Operator: Indian Airlines
- Registration: VT-EDR
- Flight origin: Palam Airport
- Destination: Raja Sansi Airport
- Occupants: 117 (including the hijackers)
- Passengers: 111
- Crew: 6
- Fatalities: 0
- Survivors: 117

Indian Airlines Flight 423 (IATA No.: IC423) was an Indian Airlines Boeing 737 domestic passenger flight from the Delhi-Palam Airport to the Amritsar-Raja Sansi Airport on 29 September 1981. It was hijacked by five Sikh terrorists of the Dal Khalsa organization (armed with daggers and a hand grenade) and taken to Lahore Airport in Pakistan. The plane had 111 passengers and 6 crew members on board. The Dal Khalsa had been demanding a separate Sikh homeland of Khalistan.

The leader of the hijackers, Gajender Singh, talked to Natwar Singh, India's ambassador in Pakistan, and put forward his demands. Singh had demanded the release of militant leader Jarnail Singh Bhindranwale and others, and a sum of $500,000 in cash.

Pakistan rescued the passengers upon request from India. Pakistan took commando action using its elite SSG forces which cleared the plane and got all passengers released. The hijackers faced trial in Pakistan and were sentenced to life imprisonment.

The accused, Satnam Singh, after completing his sentence, returned to India and was put on trial there too. However, the court discharged him, stating that the accused had already been tried for the same offence and served his sentence in Pakistan.

== See also ==
- List of hijackings of Indian aeroplanes § 1980s
- List of aircraft hijackings § 1980s
- List of accidents and incidents involving airliners by location § India
- List of accidents and incidents involving airliners by airline (D–O)#I
- List of accidents and incidents involving commercial aircraft § 1981
