= Timeline of Hijacking of Indian Airplanes =

This list of hijackings of Indian airplanes is a list of hijackings or hijacking attempts which have occurred on Indian aircraft.

As of 6th July 2017, then Civil Aviation Minister Ashok Gajapathi Raju had told parliament that the India had witnessed 19 hijacking incidents in India till then.

== List of Hijacking Incidents in India by Date ==
=== 1970–1979 ===
S.No	Date	Incidents & Description	Flight Path	People Killed	Injured	Status of the Case	Perpetrators
1	30 January 1971	Hijacking of 1971 Indian Airlines–An Indian Airlines plane, Fokker F27, named Ganga, on its way from Srinagar to Jammu was hijacked by Hashim Quereshi and Ashraf Quereshi of the Jammu Kashmir Liberation Front, who took it to Lahore. Zulfikar Ali Bhutto, then Foreign Minister of Pakistan rushed to Lahore and met the hijacker. On February 1, he persuaded them to release the crew and passengers who were then sent by road to Amritsar. The Government of India sought permission of Pakistan to send a replacement crew to fly the aircraft back to India. Pakistan authorities denied the permission, and the hijackers torched the aircraft on February 2.	Srinagar–Jammu	0	0	Verdict Given While several people were arrested in connection with the case, only Hashim Qureshi was convicted and sentenced to seven years in prison.	Hashim Quereshi and Ashraf Quereshi (affiliated with Jammu Kashmir Liberation Front)
2	10 September 1976	1976 Indian Airlines hijacking–Indian Airlines plane Boeing 737 was hijacked from Delhi by a group of six terrorists from Kashmir. Initially ordered to fly the plane to Libya, after knowing that there wasn't enough fuel for that journey, the leader of the terrorists told the pilot Captain B.N Reddy to take the flight to Karachi, Pakistan instead. To refuel the plane, they took permission from CAA Lahore airport in Pakistan to land and refuel. All the passengers and crew on board were duly returned to India the next day, after diplomatic relations between India and Pakistan were re-established and Pakistan helped with the rescue operations. The hijackers were caught in a trick during breakfast, being served colourless tranquilisers with water. All six hijackers were taken in custody and the plane was sent back to India with 83 passengers on board. The militants were later released in Pakistan citing "lack of evidence". Repercussions on the Indian side led to the suspension of 11 members of the security staff and a promise by the Minister for Tourism and Civil Aviation, Raj Bahadur, to order a detailed and "thorough inquiry" into the event "and into the security arrangements at the airport".	Delhi–Mumbai	0	0	Arrested but later released during trial in Pakistan due to "lack of evidence"	(Syed Abdul Hameed Dewani, Syed M Rafique, M. Ahsan Rathore, Abdul Rashid Malik, Ghulam Rasool, and Khawaja Ghulam Nabi Itoo) Islamist terrorists (Group affiliation unknown)
3	20 December 1978	Hijacking of Indian Airlines Flight 410–The flight was hijacked mid-air minutes before its touchdown at the erstwhile Indira Gandhi International Airport, New Delhi. The two hijackers, Bholanath Pandey and Devendra Pandey, hijacked the Indian Airlines plane on a domestic flight from Calcutta to Delhi. It is to note that the hijacking was performed with the aid of a toy gun. They demanded the release of opposition leader Indira Gandhi (who had been arrested by the Indian Parliament), the withdrawal of all charges against her son, Sanjay Gandhi, and for the Janata Party Government at the Centre to tender its resignation and leave. Initially the two demanded to fly the plane to Nepal and then Bangladesh, both of which were rejected due to shortage of fuel. Eventually the flight was taken to Varanasi where the flight was landed. It was here that the chief minister of the state of Uttar Pradesh was summoned for the negotiations. After discussions, both men released the passengers and crew. Their surrender in the presence of media was noted.	Calcutta–Delhi	0	0	Charges Dropped After Indira Gandhi and her party returned to government in the 1980 Indian general election, the prosecution against the two hijackers were dropped. The Indian National Congress party rewarded them with party tickets for the 1980 state assembly election. Both won the election and became members of the legislative assembly of Uttar Pradesh. Bholanath Pandey served as a Congress MLA from 1980 to 1985, and from 1989 to 1991, and Devendra Pandey remained a member of the house for two terms.	Bholanath Pandey and Devendra Pandey (affiliated with Indian Youth Congress)

=== 1980-1989 ===
S.No	Date	Incidents & Description	Flight Path	People Killed	Injured	Status of the Case	Perpetrators
4	29 September 1981	1981 September 29: An Indian Airlines IC-423 plane on flight from Delhi to Amritsar was hijacked by Sikh separatists and taken to Lahore. Pakistan took commando action using its elite SSG, which cleared the plane and freed all passengers.					
5	25 November 1981	1981 November 25: Air India Flight 224, a Boeing 707 plane VT-DVB "Kamet" on its way from Zambia to Mumbai, with 65 passengers and 13 crew members, was hijacked when it landed for refuelling at Mahé.The 43-strong team of mercenaries carrying an assortment of weapons demanded that the flight to be taken to Durban where the nightmare of the crew and the passengers ended after prolonged negotiations.					
6	4 August 1982	1982 August 4: An Indian Airlines flight from Delhi-Srinagar was hijacked en-route by a Sikh militant with the help of a fake bomb. The hijacker identified as Gurbaksh Singh hijacked the plane, by his own statement as direct retaliation after the Indian government has then asked Sikhs to not carry their Kirpans (Sikh ceremonial daggers) on board. The hijacked plane landed at Amritsar (after being denied permission to land in Lahore, Pakistan). After landing in Amritsar he demanded that he would list his demands only in the presence of then Shiromani Akali Dal president Harchand Singh Longowal and then Damdami Taksal chief Jarnail Singh Bhindranwale, but he later surrendered in front of then SAD general secretary Parkash Singh Majitha. All the crew and passengers on board which included 70 foreigners were rescued successfully.					
7	20 August 1982	1982 August 20: A Sikh militant, armed with a pistol and a hand grenade, hijacked a Boeing 737 on a scheduled flight from Jodhpur to New Delhi carrying 69 persons. The militant got on the plane at Udaipur on the jump flight from Bombay to Delhi stopping at Jodhpur, Udaipur and Jaipur. The hijacker was later identified as Manjit Singh an electrician from Amritsar. The militant demanded for the flight to be taken to Lahore but after being debited permission to land by the Pakistani government, it was no longer possible. Due to this the plane circled over Lahore airport more than 42 times before running short of fuel, due to which it was finally landed at Amritsar. Among the various demands that Manjit asked for was 8 Lakh Rupees in German marks, the transfer of power in Punjab to Akali Dal with the position of chief minister given to Prakash Singh Badal and the release of half Sikh security granthis. The hijacker was finally apprehended and shot dead in what was described in a rather "Ham handed" manner. All the passengers and crew on the plane were successfully rescued by the Punjab police and commandos. Peter Lamont, production designer working on the James Bond film Octopussy, was a passenger.					
8	5 July 1984	1984 July 5 : Indian Airlines Flight 423 carrying 254 passengers and a crew of ten on flight from Srinagar to New Delhi was hijacked and forced to land in Lahore, Pakistan. The hijackers were reported to be armed with pistols, daggers and explosives. The hijackers' surrender to Pakistani authorities ended a 17-hour ordeal for the plane's passengers and crew, who remained aboard the A-300 Airbus in suffocating heat, with little food and water.					
9	24 August 1984	1984 August 24: Seven young hijackers demanded an Indian Airlines Flight 421, on a domestic flight from Delhi to Srinagar with 100 passengers on board, be flown to the United States. The plane was taken to Lahore, Karachi and finally to Dubai where the defense minister of UAE negotiated the release of the passengers. It was related to the secessionist struggle in the Indian state of Punjab. The hijacker was subsequently extradited by UAE authorities to India, who handed over the pistol recovered from the hijacker.					
10	5 September 1986	1986 September 5: Pan Am Flight 73, a Boeing 747-121 serving the flight from Mumbai to New York City with 360 passengers on board, was hijacked while on the ground at Karachi by four armed Palestinian members of the Abu Nidal Organization. Forty-three passengers were injured or killed during the hijacking, including nationals from India, the United States, Pakistan, and Mexico. All the hijackers were arrested and sentenced to death in Pakistan. However, four of the hijackers remain at large. The 2016 Bollywood movie Neerja is based on this event, with focus on the actions of flight purser Neerja Bhanot.					

=== 1990-1999 ===
S.No	Date	Incidents & Description	Flight Path	People Killed	Injured	Status of the Case	Perpetrators
11	22 January 1993	1993 January 22: Indian Airlines Flight 810 en route from Lucknow to the Delhi was hijacked and returned to Lucknow. The hijacker demanded the release of all karsevaks arrested after the Demolition of the Babri Masjid situated in Ayodhya and for a temple be built at Ram Janmabhoomi. The hijacker, later identified as Satish Chandra Pandey, stated his reason for the hijacking, as a means of protest for then Prime minister Narasimha Rao's assurance that Babri Masjid would be remade. The hijacker surrendered after talking to then MP from Lucknow Atal Bihari Vajpayee, former prime minister of India. The bomb he carried was also found to be phony. Pandey was convicted for the hijacking and was sentenced to a four year imprisonment.					
12	27 March 1993	1993 March 27: Indian Airlines Flight 439 was hijacked en route from Delhi to Madras by a hijacker claiming to be strapped with explosives. The hijacker was later identified as Hari Singh, a truck driver from Haryana who said the hijacking was a protest against the ongoing Hindu-Muslim riots at that time in which more than 2,000 people had died. He forced the plane to land in Amritsar (after being denied landing permission in Lahore) and demanded political asylum in Pakistan. His demands a 40-day asylum in Pakistan and permission to speak to Pakistani media was rejected but, was allowed to speak to Indian media at Amritsar airport after his surrender. The hijacker subsequently surrendered and the explosive was found to be a disguised hair-dryer.					
13	10 April 1993	1993 April 10: An Indian Airlines Boeing 737, en route from Lucknow to Delhi, was hijacked by four students of the Government Arts College, Lucknow. The 4 youth commandeered the plane soon after takeoff from Lucknow and forced it return. The 4 students were armed with a bottle which they brandished as containing an explosive. It was later identified as being a combustible liquid capable of a small fire. They demanded changes to the college's courses, cancellation of an award to a professor and postponement of exams. One student narrated a 10-minute litany on their various grievances and demanded that unless they are allowed to meet with the governor of Uttar Pradesh they'll blow up the plane. In the words of Tom Segev, an Israeli journalist who was also a passenger on the flight: "The whole thing was like a game." The passengers didn't pay much attention to the hijackers and continued to do whatever they were doing. The flight flew in circles for 3 hours, while negotiations were done with the authorities through the control tower. After the flight landed the passengers overpowered the hijackers and successfully got the situation in control. All of the 52 passengers and 7 crew members were unharmed and saved. The hijackers beaten and bruised were handed over to authorities. This was the 3rd attempt on plane hijacking in 1993.					
14	24–25 April 1993	1993 April 24–25: Indian Airlines Flight 427 was bound for Srinagar via Jammu from Delhi when it was hijacked. The hijacker wanted to take the plane to Lahore, but Pakistan authorities refused permission. The plane landed at Amritsar where the hijacker was killed and passengers freed.					
15	13 January 1994	An Indian airline. An Airbus A320 with 56 passengers was hijacked, and the hijacker demanded Marathwada University to be renamed after Dr. B. R Ambedkar.	Bangalore–Madras				
16	24–31 December 1999	1999 December 24–31: Indian Airlines Flight 814, flying from Kathmandu, was hijacked and diverted to Kandahar, Afghanistan which was then under Taliban control, by members of the terrorist organisation Harkat-ul-Mujahideen. After a week-long stand-off, India agreed to release three jailed terrorists in exchange for the hostages. One hostage was stabbed to death and his body thrown on the tarmac as a "warning attack".					

== See also ==
- Anti-Hijacking Act, 2016
- Air India Flight 182
- List of hijackings of Turkish airplanes
- List of aircraft hijackings
- List of accidents and incidents involving airliners by location#India
- List of accidents and incidents involving airliners by airline (A–C)#A
- List of accidents and incidents involving airliners by airline (D–O)#I
- List of accidents and incidents involving commercial aircraft
