= List of accidents and incidents involving airliners by airline (D–O) =

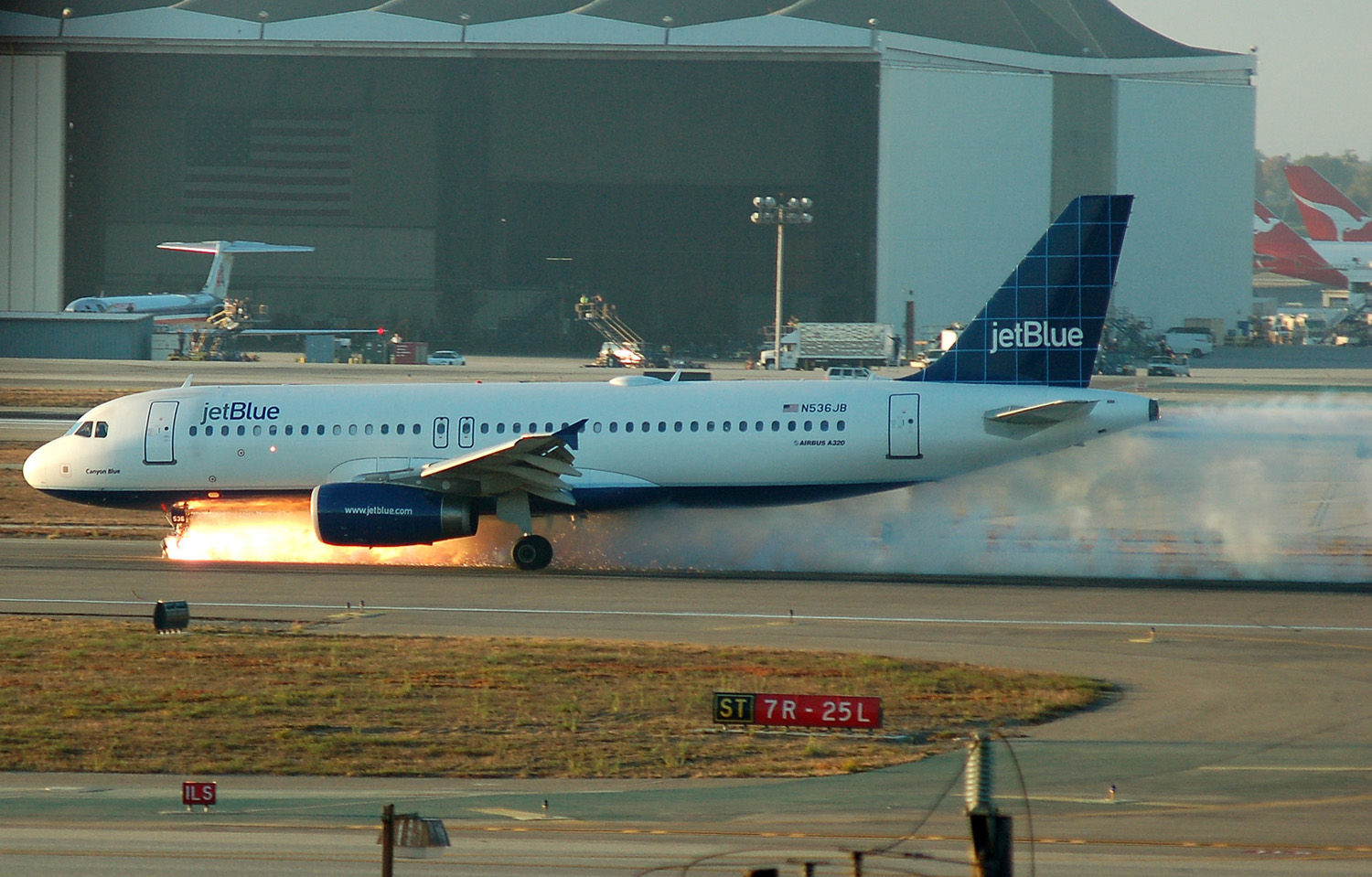
JetBlue Flight 292 making an emergency landing in September 2005 with its nose landing gear turned sideways.

This list of accidents and incidents involving airliners by airline summarizes airline accidents and all kinds of incidents, major or minor, by airline company with flight number, location, date, aircraft type, and cause.

This list is dynamic and by no means complete!

While all of the incidents in this list are noteworthy, not all the incidents listed involved fatalities.

The flight had no casualties.

The flight had at least one casualty but at least one person on board survived.

The flight ended with the deaths of everyone on board.

== D ==
Daallo Airlines
Flight designation	Location	Date	Aircraft type	Route	Cause
S9-KAS	Bender Qassim Int'l Airport	13 January 2009	Antonov An-24RV	Djibouti–Bosaso	Nose gear failure
Flight 774	Bosaso Airport	2 November 2009	Antonov An-24RV	Bosaso–Djibouti	Attempted hijacking
Flight 159	over Somalia	2 February 2016	Airbus A321-111	Mogadishu–Djibouti	Suicide bombing
Dagestan Airlines
Flight designation	Location	Date	Aircraft type	Route	Cause
Flight 372	Domodedovo Int'l Airport	4 December 2010	Tupolev Tu-154M	Moscow–Makhachkala	Fuel exhaustion
Daimler Airway
Flight designation	Location	Date	Aircraft type	Route	Cause
G-EAWO	Thieuloy-Saint-Antoine	7 April 1922	de Havilland DH.18A	Croydon–Paris	Mid-air collision with a CGEA Farman F.60
G-EBBS	Ivinghoe Beacon	14 September 1923	de Havilland DH.34	Croydon–Manchester	Pilot error, stall, loss of control
Dan-Air
Flight designation	Location	Date	Aircraft type	Route	Cause
G-AMUV	Gurgaon	25 May 1958	Avro York C.1	Karachi–New Delhi	Engine failure, in-flight fire
G-ATFZ	Godalming	1 September 1966	Piper Apache 160	Gatwick–Lasham–Bristol	Pilot error, weather
Flight 1903	Catalonia	3 July 1970	de Havilland DH-106 Comet 4	Manchester–Barcelona	Navigation error, ATC error
G-BEBP	Lusaka	14 May 1977	Boeing 707-321C	London–Athens–Nairobi–Lusaka	Design defect, structural failure
Flight 0034	Sumburgh Airport	31 July 1979	Hawker Siddeley HS 748	Shetland Islands–Aberdeen	Accidental engagement of gust lock
Flight 1008	Los Rodeos, Tenerife	25 April 1980	Boeing 727-46	Manchester–Tenerife	CFIT
Flight 240	Nailstone, England	26 June 1981	Hawker Siddeley HS 748	Gatwick–East Midlands	Rapid decompression caused by failure of baggage door
Danish Air Lines (DDL)
Flight designation	Location	Date	Aircraft type	Route	Cause
OY-DCI	Ulrichstein, Germany	12 February 1948	Douglas C-53	Copenhagen–Frankfurt	Crash on approach
OY-DLU	off Barsebäck	8 February 1949	Vickers Viking 1B	Paris–Copenhagen	CFIT
Delta Air Lines
Deruluft
Flight designation	Location	Date	Aircraft type	Route	Cause
D-AREN	Stettin, Germany (now Szczecin, Poland)	31 January 1935	Junkers Ju 52/3mge	Moscow–Königsburg (now Kaliningrad)–Gdansk–Berlin	Wing icing, loss of control
D-AJYP; Schönberg	Schievelbein, Germany (now Świdwin, Poland)	7 March 1935	Rohrbach Roland II		Structural failure
URSS-D311; Yastreb	near Nemirovo, Moscow Oblast	6 December 1936	Tupolev ANT-9	Königsburg (now Kaliningrad)–Velikiye Luki–Moscow	Navaid failures, navigation errors, CFIT
Deutsche Luft Hansa
DHL Aviation
Flight designation	Location	Date	Aircraft type	Route	Cause
Flight 611	Überlingen	1 July 2002	Boeing 757-23APF	Bergamo–Brussels	Mid-air collision with a Bashkirian Airlines Tu-154
OO-DLL	Baghdad	22 November 2003	Airbus A300B4-203F	Baghdad–Bahrain	Missile attack, loss of controls
Flight 7216	Juan Santamaría Int'l Airport	7 April 2022	Boeing 757-27A (PCF)	San José–Guatemala City	Under investigation (runway excursion)
Dominicana de Aviación
Flight designation	Location	Date	Aircraft type	Route	Cause
HI-6	near Yamasa	11 January 1948	Douglas C-47	Barahona–Santiago de los Caballeros	Weather, navigation error
Flight 402	General Andrews Int'l Airport	17 July 1958	Curtiss C-46A	Ciudad Trujillo–Miami	Engine problems, pilot error, stall, loss of control
Flight 401	near Miami International Airport	23 June 1969	Aviation Traders Carvair	Miami–Santo Domingo	Engine failure, pilot errors
HI-177	near Santo Domingo	15 February 1970	Douglas DC-9-32	Santo Domingo–San Juan	Double engine failure, loss of control
HI-617CA	Las Americas Airport	5 September 1993	Boeing 727-281	San Juan–Santo Domingo	Electrical fire, aircraft burned out
Downeast Airlines
Flight designation	Location	Date	Aircraft type	Route	Cause
Flight 46	Rockland, Maine	30 May 1979	de Havilland Canada Twin Otter 200	Boston–Rockland	Pilot error (improper IFR operation)

== E ==
EAS Airlines
Flight designation	Location	Date	Aircraft type	Route	Cause
Flight 4226	Kano	4 May 2002	BAC 1-11-525FT	Kano–Lagos	Pilot error
EasySky
Flight designation	Location	Date	Aircraft type	Route	Cause
Flight 734	Ramón Villeda Morales Int'l Airport	31 December 2012	British Aerospace Jetstream 31	Roatan–San Pedro Sula	Under investigation (runway excursion)
Eastern Air Lines
Flight designation	Location	Date	Aircraft type	Route	Cause
Flight 14	near Milford	19 December 1936	Douglas DC-2-112	Miami–Charleston–Newark	Pilot error, ATC error
Flight 7	Daytona Beach	10 August 1937	Douglas DC-2-112	Chicago–Indianapolis–Louisville–Nashville–Chattanooga–Jacksonville–Daytona Beach–Miami	CFIT (power pole)
Flight 21	near Atlanta	26 February 1941	Douglas DST-318A	New York–D.C.–Atlanta–New Orleans–Houston–Brownsville	Incorrect altimeter setting, CFIT
Flight 45	over Lamar, South Carolina	12 July 1945	Douglas DC-3-201C	D.C.–Columbia	Mid-air collision with a USAAF A-26
Flight 42	Florence, South Carolina	7 September 1945	Douglas DC-3-201G	Miami–Jacksonville–Savannah–New York City	In-flight fire for reasons unknown
Flight 14	Flushing Bay near LaGuardia Airport	30 December 1945	Douglas DC-3-201	Jacksonville–Savannah–Columbia–Raleigh–Richmond–D.C.–Philadelphia–New York City	Pilot error, runway overrun
Flight 105	Cheshire, Connecticut	18 January 1946	Douglas DC-3-201E	New York City–Boston	Fuel leak, in-flight fire, partial wing failure, loss of control
Flight 665	near Galax, Virginia	12 January 1947	Douglas C-49	Detroit–Cleveland–Akron–Winston-Salem	Navigation error, deviation from course, CFIT
Flight 605	Port Deposit, Maryland	30 May 1947	Douglas C-54B	Newark–Miami	Loss of control for reasons unknown
Flight 572	Oxon Hill, Maryland	13 January 1948	Douglas DC-3-201F	Houston–Atlanta–Greenville–Winston-Salem–D.C.	Crew error, disregard of procedure
Flight 611	off Jacksonville, Florida	7 February 1948	Lockheed L-649 Constellation	Boston–New York City–West Palm Beach–Miami	Propeller failure, fuselage penetration
Flight 557	over Chesterfield, New Jersey	30 July 1949	Douglas DC-3-201D	Boston–New York–Wilmington–Memphis	Mid-air collision with a USN F6F Hellcat
Flight 537	over Arlington, Virginia	1 November 1949	Douglas C-54B	Newark–D.C.	Mid-air collision with a Bolivian Air Force P-38
Flight 601	Curles Neck Farm	19 July 1951	Lockheed L-749A Constellation		Forced landing
Flight 627	Idlewild Int'l Airport	19 October 1953	Lockheed L-749A Constellation	New York City–San Juan	Spatial disorientation, pilot error
Flight 642	Jacksonville, Florida	21 December 1955	Lockheed L-749A Constellation	Miami–Jacksonville–Boston	Pilot error for reasons unknown
N808D	Miami Int'l Airport	28 June 1957	Douglas DC-7B	None	Ground collision with an Eastern Air Lines Lockheed L-1049 Constellation
Flight 375	Logan Int'l Airport	4 October 1960	Lockheed L-188 Electra	Boston–Philadelphia–Atlanta	Bird strikes
Flight 512	Queens	30 November 1962	Douglas DC-7B	Charlotte–New York City	Weather, pilot error
N842D	Boston	28 February 1963	Douglas DC-7		Person ran into propeller (suicide)
Flight 304	Lake Pontchartrain	25 February 1964	Douglas DC-8-21	Mexico City–New Orleans–Atlanta–Philadelphia–New York	Pitch trim compensator failure, loss of control
N809D	Richmond	16 July 1964	Douglas DC-7B	New York–Richmond	Pilot error, crashed short of runway
Flight 663	Jones Beach	8 February 1965	Douglas DC-7B	Boston–New York–Richmond–Charlotte–Greenville–Atlanta	Near-miss, evasive maneuvers, spatial disorientation
Flight 853	over Carmel, New York	4 December 1965	Lockheed L-1049C Constellation	Boston–Newark	Mid-air collision with a TWA Boeing 707 due to optical illusion and pilot error
N8943N	over Raleigh	4 December 1971	Douglas DC-9-31		Mid-air collision with a Cessna 206
Flight 346	Fort Lauderdale	18 May 1972	Douglas DC-9-31	Miami–Fort Lauderdale–Cleveland	Pilot error
Flight 401	Everglades	29 December 1972	Lockheed L-1011 TriStar 1	New York–Miami	CFIT
Flight 212	Charlotte	11 September 1974	Douglas DC-9-31	Charleston–Charlotte–Chicago	Pilot error
Flight 66	Queens	24 June 1975	Boeing 727-225	New Orleans–New York	Weather, wind shear from a microburst
Flight 855	near Miami	5 May 1983	Lockheed L-1011 TriStar	Miami–Nassau	Dual engine failure due to improper maintenance
Flight 980	Nevado Illimani	1 January 1985	Boeing 727-225	Asunción–La Paz–Guayaquil–Miami	CFIT
Flight 791	over Cape Canaveral	3 October 1990	Douglas DC-9-31		Severe turbulence, pilot error, crew error
Eastern Provincial Airways
Flight designation	Location	Date	Aircraft type	Route	Cause
CF-IHA	Godthåb harbour (now Nuuk)	12 May 1962	Canadian-Vickers PBV-1A Canso	Kangerlussuaq–Godthab	Sank on landing
EgyptAir
Flight designation	Location	Date	Aircraft type	Route	Cause
Flight 763	Shamsan Mountains	19 March 1972	Douglas DC-9-32	Cairo-Aden	CFIT
SU-AOW	Beni Suef, Egypt	5 December 1972	Boeing 707-366C	None	Possible engine separation
Flight 741	Kyrenia Mountains	29 January 1973	Ilyushin Il-18D	Cairo–Nicosia	CFIT
SU-AXB; Nefertiti	near Cairo	10 July 1974	Tupolev Tu-154	None	Stall, loss of control
YR-IMK (leased from Tarom)	Red Sea	9 December 1974	Ilyushin Il-18D	Jeddah–Cairo	CFIT
Flight 321	Luxor Airport	23 August 1976	Boeing 737-266	Cairo–Luxor	Hijacking
Flight 864	Bangkok	25 December 1976	Boeing 707-366C	Cairo-Bangkok	Pilot error
Flight 648	Luqa, Malta	24 November 1985	Boeing 737-266	Athens-Cairo	Hijacking, burned out on the ground
SU-BCA	Luxor Airport	21 September 1987	Airbus A300B4-203	Cairo–Luxor	Runway excursion
Flight 990; Thutmosis III	Nantucket	31 October 1999	Boeing 767-366ER	Los Angeles-New York City-Cairo	(disputed)
Flight 843	near Carthage Airport	7 May 2002	Boeing 737-566	Cairo–Tunis	Pilot error
Flight 181	Larnaca Airport	29 March 2016	Airbus A320-232	Alexandria-Cairo	Hijacking
Flight 667; Nefertiti	Cairo International Airport	29 July 2011	Boeing 777-266ER	Cairo–Jeddah	Cockpit fire
Flight 804	Mediterranean Sea	19 May 2016	Airbus A320-232	Paris-Cairo	Oxygen leak, cockpit fire
Eirjet
Flight designation	Location	Date	Aircraft type	Route	Cause
Unknown	Ballykelly Airfield	29 March 2006	Airbus A320	Liverpool-Derry	Pilot error, landed at wrong airport
El Al
Flight designation	Location	Date	Aircraft type	Route	Cause
4X-ADN	near Kloten Airport	24 November 1951	Douglas DC-4	Tel Aviv–Rome–Zurich–Amsterdam	Crashed on approach
Flight 402/26	near Petrich	27 July 1955	Lockheed L-149 Constellation	London–Vienna–Istanbul–Tel Aviv	Shot down
Flight 219	Amsterdam	6 September 1970	Boeing 707-458	Tel Aviv–Amsterdam–New York City	Hijacking
Flight 1862	Amsterdam	4 October 1992	Boeing 747-258F	New York City–Amsterdam–Tel Aviv	Metal fatigue, engine separation
Emirates
Flight designation	Location	Date	Aircraft type	Route	Cause
Flight 407	Melbourne Airport	20 March 2009	Airbus A340-541	Melbourne–Dubai	Crew error, tailstrike on takeoff
Flight 521	Dubai International Airport	3 August 2016	Boeing 777-31H	Thiruvananthapuram–Dubai	Pilot error, crash during go-around
Ethiopian Airlines

== F ==
Far Eastern Air Transport (FAT)
Flight designation	Location	Date	Aircraft type	Route	Cause
Flight 104	near Tainan	24 February 1969	Handley Page Herald 201	Kaohsiung–Taipei	Possible engine failure, CFIT
B-243	near Taipei	20 February 1970	Douglas C-47A		CFIT
Flight 134	Taipei Airport	31 July 1975	Vickers Viscount 837	Hualien–Taipei	Stall, loss of control
Flight 103	near Taipei	22 August 1981	Boeing 737-222	Taipei–Kaohsiung	Severe fuselage corrosion, explosive decompression, in-flight breakup
Flight 116	Kaohsiung Int'l Airport	25 October 1993	McDonnell Douglas MD-82	Kaohsiung–Taipei	Engine failure, runway overrun
Flight 128	Xiamen Airport	10 March 1997	Boeing 757-2Q8	Kaohsiung–Taipei	Hijacking
FedEx Express
Flight designation	Location	Date	Aircraft type	Route	Cause
Flight 705; John Peter Jr.	Memphis, Tennessee	7 April 1994	McDonnell Douglas DC-10-30F	Memphis-San Jose	Attempted hijacking
Flight 14; Joshua	Newark International Airport	31 July 1997	McDonnell Douglas MD-11F	Anchorage-Newark	Pilot error
Flight 647; Amber	Memphis International Airport	18 December 2003	McDonnell Douglas DC-10-10F	Oakland-Memphis	Pilot error
Flight 630; Chandra	Memphis International Airport	28 July 2006	McDonnell Douglas MD-10-10F	Seattle-Memphis	Improper maintenance, landing gear failure, runway excursion
Flight 80	Narita Int'l Airport	23 March 2009	McDonnell Douglas MD-11F	Guangzhou-Tokyo	Windshear, loss of control
Flight 910	Fort Lauderdale–Hollywood International Airport	26 October 2016	McDonnell Douglas MD-10-10F	Memphis-Fort Lauderdale	Metal fatigue, landing gear failure
Finnair/Aero OY
Flight designation	Location	Date	Aircraft type	Route	Cause
K-SALD	Gulf of Finland	16 November 1927	Junkers F.13	Tallinn–Helsinki	Unexplained disappearance
Unknown	Baltic Sea	10 November 1937	Junkers Ju 52	Turku–Stockholm	Broken propeller blade, engine separation
Flight 1631; Kaleva	Gulf of Finland off Keri Island	14 June 1940	Junkers Ju 52/3mge	Tallinn–Helsinki	Shot down
OH-LAK; Sampo	Gulf of Finland off Turku	7 November 1941	Junkers Ju 52/3mce		Contaminated fuel, triple engine failure, water ditching
OH-LAK	Hyvinkää	31 October 1945	Junkers Ju 52/3mce	Helsinki–Hyvinkää–Hämeenlinna–Tampere	Radio problems, CFIT
Flight 311	Kvevlax	3 January 1961	Douglas C-47A	Kokkola–Vaasa	Pilot error, stall (pilot was intoxicated and sleep deprived)
Flight 217	Mariehamn	8 November 1963	Douglas C-47A	Helsinki–Turku–Mariehamn	Misread altimeter, CFIT
Flight 070	Chep Lap Kok Airport	27 November 2010	Airbus A340-313X		Attempted to takeoff from taxiway
First Air
Flight designation	Location	Date	Aircraft type	Route	Cause
Flight 6560	Resolute, Nunavut, Canada	20 August 2011	Boeing 737-210C		CFIT
Flash Airlines
Flight designation	Location	Date	Aircraft type	Route	Cause
Flight 604	Sharm el-Sheikh	3 January 2004	Boeing 737-3Q8		Loss of control (due to spatial disorientation)
Flydubai
Flight designation	Location	Date	Aircraft type	Route	Cause
Flight 981	Rostov-on-Don Airport	19 March 2016	Boeing 737-8KN	Dubai–Rostov-on-Don	Crew error, spatial disorientation
Flight 1073	Tabuk Airport	30th September 2026	Boeing 737 MAX 8	Dubai - Tel Aviv	Hijacking
FlyMontserrat
Flight designation	Location	Date	Aircraft type	Route	Cause
Flight 107	V.C. Bird Int'l Airport	7 October 2012	Britten-Norman BN-2A-26 Islander	Antigua–Montserrat	Contaminated fuel, loss of engine power, loss of control
Flying Tiger Line
Flight designation	Location	Date	Aircraft type	Route	Cause
N67960	Denver	30 July 1950	Curtiss C-46F	Newark–Cleveland–Detroit–Chicago–Des Moines–Denver–Los Angeles	Poor takeoff performance for reasons unknown
Flight 841	Squak Mountain	7 January 1953	Douglas C-54B	Burbank–San Francisco–Seattle	Crew error, CFIT
Flight 7413-23	Pacific Ocean	24 September 1955	Douglas C-54A	Honolulu–Wake Island	Crew error, fuel exhaustion, engine failure, water ditching
N6920C	Mount Ōyama	9 September 1958	Lockheed L-1049H Super Constellation	Travis AFB–Wake Island–Tachikawa Air Base	CFIT
Flight 739	Pacific Ocean	15 March 1962	Lockheed L-1049H Super Constellation	Travis AFB–Honolulu–Wake Island–Guam–Clark AFB–Saigon	Unexplained disappearance
Flight 7816	Adak	15 March 1962	Lockheed L-1049H Super Constellation	Travis AFB–Cold Bay–Adak–Misawa–Okinawa	Pilot error
Flight 923	Atlantic Ocean	23 September 1962	Lockheed L-1049H Super Constellation	Gander–Frankfurt	Crew error, triple engine failure, water ditching
Flight 183	Hollywood-Lockheed Air Terminal	14 December 1962	Lockheed L-1049H Super Constellation	Chicago–Burbank	Pilot incapacitation, loss of control
Flight 282	San Bruno Mountain	24 December 1964	Lockheed L-1049H Super Constellation	San Francisco–New York City	Deviation from course for reasons unknown
Flight 914	California Peak	15 December 1965	Lockheed L-1049H Super Constellation	Los Angeles–Chicago	Spatial disorientation
Flight 6303	Naval Station Norfolk	21 March 1966	Canadair CL-44D4-2	Indianapolis–NAS Norfolk	Crew error
N228SW	Da Nang	24 December 1966	Canadair CL-44D4-1	Tachikawa Air Base–Da Nang	Crashed short of runway
Flight 45	Okinawa	27 July 1970	Douglas DC-8-63AF	Los Angeles–San Francisco–Seattle–Cold Bay–Tokyo–Okinawa–Cam Ranh Bay–Da Nang	Crew error
Flight 2468	Naval Station Norfolk	25 October 1983	Douglas DC-8-63CF	New York City–NAS Norfolk	Crew error, ATC error, runway overrun
Flight 066; Thomas Haywood	near Kuala Lumpur	19 February 1989	Boeing 747-249F	Singapore–Kuala Lumpur	ATC error, CFIT
Formosa Airlines (now Mandarin Airlines)
Flight designation	Location	Date	Aircraft type	Route	Cause
B-12268	Orchid Island Airport	14 August 1990	Dornier 228-201	Taipei–Lanyu	Crashed short of runway
B-12238	off Orchid Island	28 February 1993	Dornier 228-201	Taipei–Orchid Island	Weather, CFIT
B-12298	Green Island Airport	14 June 1993	Dornier 228-201	Taitung City–Green Island	Crashed short of runway
B-12288	Taitung Airport	15 June 1995	Dornier 228-201	Green Island–Taitung City	Belly landing
B-12208	Green Island Airport	18 June 1995	Dornier 228-201	Green Island–Taitung City	Loss of control (while taxiing)
Flight 7613	off Matsu Beigan Airport	5 April 1996	Dornier 228-212	Taipei–Matsu Island	Poor visibility, pilot error
Flight 7601	near Matsu Beigan Airport	10 August 1997	Dornier 228-212	Taipei–Matsu Island	Weather, aborted landing, CFIT
B-12255	off Hsinchu	18 March 1998	Saab 340B	Hsinchu-Kaohsiung	Partial electrical failure, poor visibility, pilot fatigue, crew disregard of procedure
Fuji Air Lines
Flight designation	Location	Date	Aircraft type	Route	Cause
Flight 902	Oita Airport	27 February 1964	Convair CV-240-0	Kagoshima–Oita	Pilot error, runway overrun
Fujita Airlines
Flight designation	Location	Date	Aircraft type	Route	Cause
JA6155	Mount Hachijō–Fuji	17 August 1963	de Havilland Heron 1B	Hachijojima–Tokyo	Poor visibility, CFIT

== G ==
Garuda Indonesia
Germanwings
Flight designation	Location	Date	Aircraft type	Route	Cause
Flight 9525	Prads-Haute-Bléone	24 March 2015	Airbus A320-211	Barcelona–Düsseldorf	Deliberate crash (by co-pilot)
Globe Air
Flight designation	Location	Date	Aircraft type	Route	Cause
HB-ITD	near Nicosia Airport	21 April 1967	Bristol Britannia 313	Bangkok–Colombo–Bombay–Cairo–Basel	CFIT in bad weather
Gulf Air
Flight designation	Location	Date	Aircraft type	Route	Cause
Flight 771	Jebel Ali	23 September 1983	Boeing 737-200	Karachi–Abu Dhabi	Terrorism, bombing
Flight 072	Al Muharraq	23 August 2000	Airbus A320-212	Cairo–Bahrain	Pilot error, CFIT
Gol Transportes Aéreos
Flight designation	Location	Date	Aircraft type	Route	Cause
Flight 1907	Mato Grosso	29 September 2006	Boeing 737-8EH	Manaus–Brasília–Rio de Janeiro	Mid-air collision with an Embraer Legacy
Golden West Airlines
Flight designation	Location	Date	Aircraft type	Route	Cause
Flight 261	Whittier, California	9 January 1975	de Havilland Twin Otter	Ontario–Los Angeles	Mid-air collision with a Cessna 150

== H ==
Handley Page Transport
Flight designation	Location	Date	Aircraft type	Route	Cause
G-EAMA	Golders Green	14 December 1920	Handley Page O/400	London–Paris	CFIT for reasons unknown
G-EATN	near Le Bourget Airport	14 January 1922	Handley Page O/10	London–Paris	Crash on approach
Hapag-Lloyd Airlines
Flight designation	Location	Date	Aircraft type	Route	Cause
Flight 3378	Schwechat International Airport	12 July 2000	Airbus A310-304	Chania-Hanover	Mechanical failure, fuel depletion
Hawthorne Nevada Airlines
Flight designation	Location	Date	Aircraft type	Route	Cause
Flight 708	Mount Whitney	18 February 1969	Douglas C-49J	Hollywood-Hawthorne	Weather, pilot error, CFIT
Helios Airways
Flight designation	Location	Date	Aircraft type	Route	Cause
Flight 522	Marathon, Greece	14 August 2005	Boeing 737-31S	Larnaca–Athens–Prague	Gradual depressurization, pilot incapacitation, fuel exhaustion
Henan Airlines
Flight designation	Location	Date	Aircraft type	Route	Cause
Flight 8387	Lindu Airport	24 August 2010	Embraer E-190	Harbin–Yichun	CFIT
Hillman's Airways
Flight designation	Location	Date	Aircraft type	Route	Cause
G-ACPM	English Channel off Folkestone	2 October 1934	de Havilland Dragon Rapide	Essex–Paris	Pilot error, CFIT
Horizon Air
Flight designation	Location	Date	Aircraft type	Route	Cause
Flight 2658	Seattle–Tacoma International Airport	15 April 1988	de Havilland Canada DHC-8-102	Seattle–Spokane	Engine fire, runway excursion, collision with jetways
N449QX	Ketron Island	10 August 2018	Bombardier Dash 8 Q400	None	Aircraft stolen, CFIT (suicide)

== I ==
IAS Cargo Airlines
Flight designation	Location	Date	Aircraft type	Route	Cause
G-BEBP (operated by Dan-Air)	Lusaka Airport	14 May 1977	Boeing 707-321C	London–Athens–Nairobi–Lusaka	Structural failure, loss of control, design defect
Iberia Airlines
Flight designation	Location	Date	Aircraft type	Route	Cause
M-CABA	off Europa Point	18 December 1939	Junkers Ju 52/3m	Alicante–Tetuan	Accidental shoot-down
EC-ABK	Pandols Mountain	23 December 1948	Douglas C-47	Madrid–Barcelona	CFIT
EC-ACH	near Getafe	28 October 1957	Douglas C-47A	Tangier–Madrid	Engine fire, engine separation, loss of control
EC-ABC	Sierra de Valdemeca	29 April 1959	Douglas C-47A	Barcelona–Madrid	Weather, deviation from route
EC-ATB	near Carmona	12 October 1962	Convair CV-440-62	Valencia–Seville	CFIT
EC-ATH	off Tangier Airport	31 March 1965	Convair CV-440-62	Málaga–Tangier	Stall for reasons unknown
Flight 401	Los Rodeos Airport	5 May 1965	Lockheed L-1049G Super Constellation	Madrid–Tenerife	Pilot error
Flight 062	Black Down, Sussex	4 November 1967	Sud Aviation Caravelle 10R	Málaga–London	Excessive descent for reasons unknown, CFIT
Flight 602	near Ibiza Airport	7 January 1972	Sud Aviation Caravelle VIR	Valencia–Ibiza	CFIT
Flight 504	near Nantes, France	5 March 1973	Douglas DC-9-32	Palma de Mallorca–London	Mid-air collision with a Spantax Convair 990
Flight 350	Madrid Airport	7 December 1983	Boeing 727-256	Madrid–Rome	Runway collision with an Aviaco DC-9
Flight 610; Alhambra de Grenada	near Bilbao	19 February 1985	Boeing 727-256	Madrid–Bilbao	Pilot error, CFIT
Icelandic Airlines (Loftleiðir)
Flight designation	Location	Date	Aircraft type	Route	Cause
TF-RVC; Geysir	Vatnajökull	14 September 1950	Douglas C-54B	Luxembourg–Reykjavik	CFIT
Flight 509	John F. Kennedy Int'l Airport	23 June 1973	Douglas DC-8-61CF	Reykjavik–New York City	Crew error
Flight 001 (operated by Garuda Indonesia)	Colombo Airport, Sri Lanka	15 November 1978	Douglas DC-8-63CF	Jeddah–Colombo–Surabaya	Crashed on approach, cause disputed
Imperial Airlines
Flight designation	Location	Date	Aircraft type	Route	Cause
Flight 201/8	near Richmond Int'l Airport	8 November 1961	Lockheed L-049E Constellation	Columbia–Newark–Wilkes Barre–Baltimore–Columbia	Poor CRM, triple engine failure
Imperial Airways
Flight designation	Location	Date	Aircraft type	Route	Cause
G-EBBX	Purley	24 December 1924	de Havilland DH.34	Croydon–Paris	Undetermined
G-EMBS; Prince Henry	English Channel	21 October 1926	Handley Page W.10	Croydon–Paris	Engine failure, water ditching
G-EBLB	Purley, Surrey	13 July 1928	Vickers Vulcan	None	Engine failure
G-EBMT; City of Ottawa	English Channel off Dungeness	17 June 1929	Handley Page W.10	Croydon–Paris–Basel–Zurich	Engine failure, water ditching
G-EBMZ; City of Jerusalem	Jask Airport, Iran	6 September 1929	de Havilland Hercules	Bandar Lengeh–Jask	Pilot error, stall, loss of control
G-AADN; City of Rome	La Spazia	26 October 1929	Short Calcutta	Naples–Genoa	Unexplained mechanical failure, crashed at sea
G-EBIX; City of Washington	Bologne	30 October 1930	Handley Page W.8g	Croydon–Paris	Stall, loss of control, CFIT
G-AAGX; Hannibal	Five Oak Green, Kent	8 August 1931	Handley Page H.P.42E		Engine failure
G-AACI; City of Liverpool	Near Diksmuide, Belgium	28 March 1933	Armstrong Whitworth Argosy II	Cologne–Brussels–Croydon	In-flight fire, possible sabotage
G-ABLU; Apollo	Ruysselede, Belgium	30 December 1933	Avro 618 Ten	Cologne–Brussels–Croydon	Pilot error, CFIT
G-ABFB; Sylvanus	Brindisi Harbor	5 November 1935	Short Kent	London–Brindisi–Alexandria	Caught fire during refueling, burned out
G-AASJ; City of Khartoum	off Alexandria	31 December 1935	Short Calcutta	London–Brindisi–Crete–Alexandria	Fuel exhaustion
G-ABKY	Croydon	10 August 1936	Vickers Vellox	Croydon–Paris	In-flight fire
G-ABFA; Scipio	Mirabella, Crete	22 August 1936	Short Kent	Alexandria–Crete–Brindisi–Southampton	Hard landing
G-ACOX; Boadicea	English Channel	25 September 1936	Boulton & Paul P.71A	Croydon–Paris	Unknown
G-ACVZ	Elsdorf, Germany	15 March 1937	de Havilland Express	Croydon–Cologne	Unknown
G-ADVA; Capricornus	near Ouroux	24 March 1937	Short S.23 Empire	Southampton–Brindisi–Crete–Alexandria–Durban	Navigation error, CFIT
G-AXXE; Hengist	Karachi	31 May 1937	Handley Page H.P.42E	None	Burned in hangar fire
G-ADVC; Courtier	Phaleron Bay	1 October 1937	Short S.23 Empire	Alexandria–Athens	Poor visibility, hard landing
G-ADUZ; Cygnus	Brindisi Harbor	5 December 1937	Short S.23 Empire		Pilot error, stall, loss of control, crash on takeoff
G-ABTG; Amalthea	Kisumu, Kenya	27 July 1938	Armstrong Whitworth Atalanta	Kisumu–Alexandria	CFIT
G-AETW; Calpurnia	Lake Habbaniyah, Iran	27 November 1938	Short S.23 Empire	Southampton–Sydney	Spatial disorientation, CFIT
G-ADUU; Cavalier	Atlantic Ocean	21 January 1939	Short S.23 Empire	Port Washington–Bermuda–Southampton	Icing, loss of engine power
G-ADVD; Challenger	Lumbo lagoon, Ilha de Mocambique	1 May 1939	Short S.23 Empire	London–Cairo–Mombasa–Dar es-Salaam–Lumbo–Maputo–Johannesburg	Crashed on landing
Flight 197; Hannibal	Gulf of Oman	1 March 1940	Handley Page H.P.42E	Calcutta–Jask–Sharjah–Alexandria–London	Unexplained disappearance
Independent Air
Flight designation	Location	Date	Aircraft type	Route	Cause
Flight 1851	Santa Maria Island, Azores	8 February 1989	Boeing 707-331B	Bergamo–Azores–Punt Cana	CFIT
Indian Airlines
Flight designation	Location	Date	Aircraft type	Route	Cause
VT-CHF	near Sonegaon Airport	12 December 1953	Douglas C-47A	Nagpur-Madras	Loss of power, loss of control, CFIT
VT-COZ	Guwahati	21 January 1955	Douglas C-47A	Calcutta-Guwahati	CFIT
VT-CVB	Nagpur	2 February 1955	Douglas C-47A	Nagpur-Delhi	Pilot error
VT-CGN	Salonibari Airport	21 March 1956	Douglas C-47A		Pilot error, stall, runway excursion
VT-DBA	Tribhuvan Airport	15 May 1956	Douglas C-47A		Runway overrun
VT-DGK	Agartala	19 October 1956	Douglas DC-3		Weather, CFIT
VT-CFB	Kingsway Camp, India	13 March 1957	Douglas C-47A	None	Loss of control
VT-AUV	Santoshpur	5 May 1957	Douglas C-47A	Silchar-Calcutta	Weather, windshear
VT-COJ	near Damroh	25 June 1958	Douglas DC-3C	None	Possible loss of power, CFIT
VT-CYM	near Dhaka	9 July 1958	Douglas C-47A	Agartala-Dhaka	In-flight breakup
VT-CYH	near Tobu	12 March 1959	Douglas C-47A	None	CFIT
VT-CGI	35 mi west of Silchar	29 March 1959	Douglas C-47A	Calcutta-Agartala-Silchar-Imphal	Weather, severe turbulence, in-flight breakup
VT-CGG	near Taksing	3 January 1960	Douglas C-47A	None	Pilot error, navigation error, stall, loss of control
VT-AUS	near Lahore	15 July 1962	Douglas C-47A	Kabul-Amritsar	Bird strike
VT-AUL	Sarna	3 June 1963	Douglas DC-3 Hiper	Amritsar–Srinagar	Loss of control, in-flight breakup
VT-DIO	51 mi south of Agra	11 September 1963	Vickers Viscount 768D	Nagpur-Delhi	Loss of control for reasons unknown
PH-SAB (leased from Schreiner Airways)	Banihall Pass	7 February 1966	Fokker F27-200	Srinagar-Jammu-Amritsar-Delhi	Navigation error, CFIT
VT-DPP	Palam Airport	15 February 1966	Sud Caravelle VI-N	Calcutta-Delhi	Crashed short of runway
VT-DSB	Mumbai	4 September 1966	Sud Caravelle VI-N	None	CFIT
VT-DOJ	near Khulna Airport	21 April 1969	Fokker F27-200	Agartala–Khulna	Weather, loss of control
VT-DWT	near Silchar	29 August 1970	Fokker F27-400	Silchar–Guwahait	Pilot error, CFIT
VT-DMA	Lahore Airport, Pakistan	30 January 1971	Fokker F-27 Friendship 100	Srinagar–Jammu	Hijacking
VT-DXG	Chinnamanur	9 December 1971	HAL 748-224 Srs. 2	Thiruvananthapuram–Madurai	Deviation from course, CFIT
VT-DME	near Delhi-Palam Airport	12 August 1972	Fokker F27-100	Gwalior–Delhi	Pilot error
VT-EAU	near Hyderabad	15 March 1973	HAL 748-224 Srs. 2	None	Crew errors, crew incapitation
Flight 440	New Delhi	31 May 1973	Boeing 737-2A8	Madras–New Delhi	Pilot error, crash on landing
Flight 171	Bombay-Santacruz Airport	12 October 1976	Sud Caravelle VI-N	Bombay–Madras	Engine failure, in-flight fire, loss of control
–	Lahore Airport, Pakistan	10 September 1976	Boeing 737-200	Delhi–Bombay	Hijacking
VT-EAL	Begumpet Airport	17 December 1978	Boeing 737-2A8	Hyderabad–New Delhi	Crashed on takeoff
Flight 410	Varanasi	20 December 1978	Boeing 737-200	Calcutta–Lucknow	Hijacking
VT-DXJ	near Panvel	4 August 1979	HAL 748-224 Srs. 2	Pune–Bombay (now Mumbai)	Instrument failure, pilot error, ATC errors, CFIT
Flight 423	Lahore Airport, Pakistan	29 September 1981	Boeing 737-200	Delhi–Amritsar	Hijacking
–	Amritsar Airport	4 August 1982	Boeing 737-200	Delhi–Amritsar	Hijacking
–	Amritsar Airport	20 August 1982	Boeing 737-200	Jodhpur–Delhi	Hijacking
Flight 405	Lahore Airport, Pakistan	5 July 1984	Airbus A300	Srinagar–Delhi	Hijacking
Flight 421	Lahore Airport, Pakistan	24 August 1984	Boeing 737-2A8 Advanced	Delhi–Srinagar	Hijacking
Flight 113	Ahmedabad	19 October 1988	Boeing 737-2A8	Mumbai–Ahmedabad	Pilot error, weather, lack of navigational aids
Flight 605	Bangalore	14 February 1990	Airbus A320	Mumbai–Bangalore	Pilot error, CFIT
Flight 257	near Imphal Airport	16 August 1991	Boeing 737-2A8	Calcutta–Imphal	CFIT
Flight 810	Lucknow Airport	22 January 1993	–	Lucknow–Delhi	Hijacking
Fight 439	Amritsar Airport	27 March 1993	Airbus A320-231	Delhi–Madras	Hijacking
–	Lucknow Airport	10 April 1993	Boeing 737-2A8	Lucknow–Delhi	Hijacking
Flight 427	Amritsar Airport	24 April 1993	Boeing 737-2A8	Srinagar–Delhi	Hijacking
Flight 491	near Aurangabad Airport	26 April 1993	Boeing 737-2A8	Aurangabad–Bombay	Pilot error
Flight 814	Kathmandu	24 December 1999	Airbus A300B2-101	Kathmandu–Delhi	Hijacking
Indonesia AirAsia
Flight designation	Location	Date	Aircraft type	Route	Cause
Flight 8501	Karimata Strait	28 December 2014	Airbus A320-216	Surabaya–Singapore	Mechanical failure, crew error, stall, loss of control
Flight 509	Ngurah Rai International Airport	16 May 2016	Airbus A320-216	Singapore-Denpasar	Crew miscommunication
Flight 535	Perth	16 October 2017	Airbus A330	Perth-Bali	Loss of altitude
Inex-Adria Aviopromet (now Adria Airways)
Flight designation	Location	Date	Aircraft type	Route	Cause
Flight 450	near Prague	30 October 1975	Douglas DC-9-32	Tivat–Prague	Ground impact during final approach in foggy weather
Flight 550	near Vrbovec	10 September 1976	Douglas DC-9-31	Split–Cologne	Mid-air collision with a British Airways Trident
Flight 1308	Mont San-Pietro	1 December 1981	McDonnell Douglas MD-82	Ljubljana–Ajaccio	CFIT
Interflug
Flight designation	Location	Date	Aircraft type	Route	Cause
DM-SEA	near Königs Wusterhausen	14 August 1972	Ilyushin Il-62	East Berlin–Bourgas	In-flight fire
DM-SCA	Schönefeld Airport	30 October 1972	Tupolev Tu-134		Hard landing, ran off runway
Flight 1107	Leipzig Airport	1 September 1975	Tupolev Tu-134	Stuttgart–Leipzig	ATC error, crew error
DM-SEM	Schönefeld Airport	22 November 1977	Tupolev Tu-134A	Moscow–East Berlin	Pilot error
DM-STL	Luanda, Angola	26 March 1979	Ilyushin Il-18D		Engine failure, aborted takeoff, runway overrun
Flight 102	Schönefeld Airport	17 June 1989	Ilyushin Il-62M	East Berlin–Moscow	Mechanical failure, runway overrun
IrAero
Flight designation	Location	Date	Aircraft type	Route	Cause
RA-26053	Ust-Kuiga	27 December 2002	Antonov An-26B	Yakutsk–Ust Kuiga	Crew disregard of procedure, hard landing
Flight 103	Ignatyevo Airport	8 August 2011	Antonov An-24	Chita–Blagoveshchensk–Khabarovsk	Runway overrun
Iran Air
Flight designation	Location	Date	Aircraft type	Route	Cause
EP-IRD	Alborz Mountains, Iran	21 January 1980	Boeing 727-86	Mashhad–Tehran	Inoperable ILS and ground radar
EP-IRG	Shiraz Airport	15 October 1986	Boeing 737-286	None	Destroyed on the ground
Flight 655	Strait of Hormuz	3 July 1988	Airbus A300B2-203	Bandar Abbas–Dubai	US military missile shoot-down
Flight 277	Urmia Airport	9 January 2011	Boeing 727-286	Tehran–Urmia	Bad weather
Flight 742	Mehrabad Int'l Airport	18 October 2011	Boeing 727-286		Nosegear failure
Iran Air Tours
Flight designation	Location	Date	Aircraft type	Route	Cause
EP-ITD	near Mehrabad Int'l Airport	8 February 1993	Tupolev Tu-154M	Tehran–Mashhad	Mid-air collision with an IAF Su-24
Flight 956	near Sarab-e Do Rah	12 February 2002	Tupolev Tu-154M	Tehran–Khorramabad	Pilot error, CFIT
Flight 945	Mashhad Airport	1 September 2006	Tupolev Tu-154M	Bandar Abbas–Mashhad	Crashed on landing
Iran Aseman Airlines
Flight designation	Location	Date	Aircraft type	Route	Cause
EP-ANA	Ramsar Airport	4 October 1990	Fokker F27-600		Runway overrun
Flight 746	near Natanz	12 October 1994	Fokker F28-1000	Istafan–Tehran	Contaminated fuel, double engine failure, loss of control
Flight 775	Ahwaz Airport	18 July 2000	Fokker F28-4000	Tehran–Ahwaz	Landed next to runway
Flight 773	Tabriz Airport	26 August 2010	Fokker 100	Tehran–Tabriz	Runway excursion
Flight 853	Zahedan Airport	10 May 2014	Fokker 100	Mashhad–Zahedan	Landing gear failure, forced landing
Flight 3704	Mount Dena, near Semirom	18 February 2018	ATR 72-212	Tehran–Yasuj	Crew errors, windshear, CFIT
Iraqi Airways
Flight designation	Location	Date	Aircraft type	Route	Cause
Flight 163	Arar, Saudi Arabia	25 December 1986	Boeing 737-270C	Baghdad–Amman	Hijacking
Islamic Revolutionary Guard Corps
Flight designation	Location	Date	Aircraft type	Route	Cause
15-2280	Shahdad, Iran	19 February 2003	Ilyushin Il-76MD	Zahedan–Kerman	CFIT
Itavia
Flight designation	Location	Date	Aircraft type	Route	Cause
I-AOMU	Mount Capanne	14 October 1960	de Havilland Heron 2	Rome–Genoa	CFIT
Flight 703	near Sora	30 March 1963	Douglas C-47B	Pescara–Rome	Pilot error, CFIT
I-TIVE	Ciampino Airport	4 November 1970	Handley Page Herald 203	None	Engine failure, crash on landing
Flight 897	near Torino Airport	1 January 1974	Fokker F28-1000	Bologna–Torino	Pilot error, wing failure, loss of control
I-TIDA	Orio Al Serio Airport	9 April 1975	Fokker F28-1000	Bergamo–Bologna	Stalled on climbout, crashed on runway
Flight 870	Ustica	27 June 1980	Douglas DC-9-15	Bologna–Palermo	Contested. Evidence suggests a terrorist bombing, official position of Italy is shot down by French Navy fighter.

== J ==
Japan Airlines (JAL)
Japan Air System
Flight designation	Location	Date	Aircraft type	Route	Cause
Flight 451	Hanamaki Airport	18 April 1993	Douglas DC-9-41	Nagoya–Morioka	Windshear, hard landing
Flight 979	Tokunoshima Airport	1 January 2004	McDonnell Douglas MD-81	Kagoshima–Tokunoshima	Landing gear failure
Japan Domestic Airlines
Flight designation	Location	Date	Aircraft type	Route	Cause
JA8030	Haneda Airport	26 August 1966	Convair CV-880-22M-3	None	Loss of control for reasons unknown
JAT Yugoslav Airlines
Flight designation	Location	Date	Aircraft type	Route	Cause
Flight 367	Srbská Kamenice	26 January 1972	Douglas DC-9-32	Copenhagen–Belgrade	Bombing
Flight 769	near Titograd	11 September 1973	Sud Aviation Caravelle VI-N	Skopje–Titograd	ATC error, radar failure, CFIT
Jeju Air
Flight designation	Location	Date	Aircraft type	Route	Cause
Flight 2216	Muan International Airport	29 December 2024	Boeing 737-8AS	Bangkok–Muan	Under investigation (crashed following wheels-up landing)
JetBlue Airways
Flight designation	Location	Date	Aircraft type	Route	Cause
Flight 292; Canyon Blue	Los Angeles	21 September 2005	Airbus A320-232	Burbank–New York	Nosegear malfunction
Ju-Air
Flight designation	Location	Date	Aircraft type	Route	Cause
HB-HOT	Piz Segnas	4 August 2018	Junkers Ju 52/3mg4e	Locarno–Dübendorf	Pilot error, CFIT
Jubba Airways
Flight designation	Location	Date	Aircraft type	Route	Cause
5Y-JXN	Mogadishu	18 July 2022	Fokker 50	Baidoa–Mogadishu	Windshear, loss of control, crash on landing

== K ==
Kam Air
Flight designation	Location	Date	Aircraft type	Route	Cause
Flight 904	Pamir Mountains	3 February 2005	Boeing 737-242A	Herat–Kabul	Unexplained descent, CFIT
Katekavia
Flight designation	Location	Date	Aircraft type	Route	Cause
Flight 9357	Igarka	3 August 2010	Antonov An-24	Krasnoyarsk–Igarka	Pilot error
Kazakhstan Airlines
Flight designation	Location	Date	Aircraft type	Route	Cause
46478	Kostanay	16 January 1993	Antonov An-24RV		Engine failure, crashed short of runway
UN-85455	Karachi International Airport	21 January 1995	Tupolev Tu-154B-2		Overloading, failed to takeoff, runway overrun
UN-26080	Sambailo Airport	26 January 1995	Antonov An-26B		Rejected takeoff, runway overrun
UN-88181	Dzhambul Airport	13 April 1995	Yakovlev Yak-40K		Steering failure, ran off runway
UN-47710	Shymkent	1 November 1995	Antonov An-24B	None	Double engine failure, hard landing
Flight 1907	Charkhi Dadri	12 November 1996	Ilyushin Il-76TD	Shymkent–Delhi	Mid-air collision with a Saudia Boeing 747
Kenya Airways
Flight designation	Location	Date	Aircraft type	Route	Cause
Flight 431	Abidjan	30 January 2000	Airbus A310-300	Abidjan-Lagos-Nairobi	Pilot error due to false alarm
Flight 507	Cameroon	5 May 2007	Boeing 737-800		Pilot error
KLM
KNILM
Flight designation	Location	Date	Aircraft type	Route	Cause
PK-AFO	Denpasar	22 January 1940	Lockheed Super Electra		CFIT
PK-AFS	Kupang, Timor	26 January 1942	Grumman G-21A Goose		Shot down
PK-AFV; Pelikaan	Carnot Bay, Australia	5 March 1942	Douglas DC-3	Bandung-Broome	Shot down
Kogalymavia (now Metrojet)
Flight designation	Location	Date	Aircraft type	Route	Cause
Flight 348	Surgut Int'l Airport	1 January 2011	Tupolev Tu-154B-2	Surgut-Moscow	In-flight fire
Flight 9268	near Hasna, North Sinai Governorate, Egypt	31 October 2015	Airbus A321-231	Sharm-el-Sheikh - St. Petersburg	Terrorism, bombing
Korean Air

== L ==
LaMia
Flight designation	Location	Date	Aircraft type	Route	Cause
Flight 2933	Cerro Gordo, La Unión, Antioquia	29 November 2016	Avro RJ85	Santa Cruz de la Sierra–Medellín	Pilot error, fuel exhaustion, CFIT
LAM Mozambique Airlines
Flight designation	Location	Date	Aircraft type	Route	Cause
Flight 470; Chaimite	Bwabwata National Park	29 November 2013	Embraer E-190	Maputo-Luanda	Deliberate crash (by pilot)
LANSA
Flight designation	Location	Date	Aircraft type	Route	Cause
Flight 501	Mount Talaula	27 April 1966	Lockheed L-749A Constellation	Lima-Cuzco	Pilot error, overloading, CFIT
Flight 502	Cuzco	9 August 1970	Lockheed L-188A Electra	Cuzco-Lima	Ground crew error, improper maintenance, pilot error, loss of control
Flight 508	Puerto Inca, Amazon rainforest, Peru	24 December 1971	Lockheed L-188A Electra	Lima-Pucallpa	Weather, severe turbulence, lightning strike, wing separation, in-flight breakup
LAN Chile (now LATAM Airlines)
Flight designation	Location	Date	Aircraft type	Route	Cause
CC-CLC-0072	near El Plummerillo Airport	20 January 1944	Lockheed 18-56-23 Lodestar	Mendoza-San Juan	Crashed on takeoff
CC-CLC-0100	near Chamonate Airport	15 June 1953	Lockheed 18-56-23 Lodestar	Copiapo-Santiago	Engine fire
Flight 621	La Gotera Hill	3 April 1961	Douglas DC-3C	Temuco-Santiago	CFIT for reasons unknown
Flight 107	San José Volcano	6 February 1965	Douglas DC-6B	Santiago-Ezeiza	Pilot error, CFIT
Flight 160	Colina	28 April 1969	Boeing 727-116	Ezeiza-Santiago	CFIT
CC-CHJ	Calama	4 August 1987	Boeing 737-2A1	Antofagasta-Calama	Crashed short of runway
Flight 1069	Puerto Williams	20 February 1991	BAe 146-200A	Punta Arenas-Puerto Williams	Pilot error, runway overrun
Lao Air (now Lao Skyway)
Flight designation	Location	Date	Aircraft type	Route	Cause
Flight 200	Thoulakhom District	11 April 2009	Cessna 208B Grand Caravan	Vientiane–Xam Neua	Engine failure, forced landing
Flight 201	Sam Neua Airport	17 April 2013	de Havilland Canada Twin Otter 300	Xam Neua–Vientiane	Crash on takeoff
Lao Airlines
Flight designation	Location	Date	Aircraft type	Route	Cause
Flight 301	Mekong River near Pakxe	16 October 2013	ATR 72-212A	Vientiane–Pakxe	Weather, pilot error, CFIT
Lao Aviation (now Lao Airlines)
Flight designation	Location	Date	Aircraft type	Route	Cause
RDPL-34117	Phonsavan	13 December 1993	Harbin Y-12-II	Vientiane–Phonsavan	Poor visibility, CFIT
RDPL-34001	Long Tieng	25 May 1998	Yakovlev Yak-40	Vientiane–Xiengkhouang–Hanoi	Weather, premature descent, CFIT
Flight 703	near Xam Neua	19 October 2000	Harbin Y-12-II	Vientiane–Xam Neua	Pilot error, CFIT
LAPA
Flight designation	Location	Date	Aircraft type	Route	Cause
Flight 3142	Buenos Aires	31 August 1999	Boeing 737-204C	Buenos Aires–Cordoba	Pilot error, operational error, negligence
Lauda Air
Flight designation	Location	Date	Aircraft type	Route	Cause
Flight 004	Uthai Thani Province	26 May 1991	Boeing 767-3Z9ER	Hong Kong—Bangkok—Vienna	Engine went into reverse, in flight. Mechanical failure
Líneas Aéreas Comerciales, SA (LACSA)
Flight designation	Location	Date	Aircraft type	Route	Cause
XA-UKR	near Plan de Guadalupe International Airport	19 April 2014	BAe 125-700A	Cozumel–Saltillo	Under investigation (CFIT)
Linjeflyg
Flight designation	Location	Date	Aircraft type	Route	Cause
Flight 267	near Helsingborg-Ängelholm Airport	20 November 1964	Convair 440	Stockholm–Hultsfred–Halmstad–Ängelholm	Pilot error, crashed short of runway
Flight 618 (operated by Skyline Sweden)	near Stockholm	15 January 1977	Vickers Viscount 838	Malmö–Kristianstad–Växjö–Jönköping–Stockholm	Icing
Lion Air
Flight designation	Location	Date	Aircraft type	Route	Cause
Flight 386	Sultan Syarif Kasim II Airport	14 January 2002	Boeing 737-291	Pekanbaru–Batam	Incorrectly set flaps, runway overrun on takeoff
Flight 583	Surakarta	30 November 2004	McDonnell Douglas MD-82	Jakarta–Surakarta–Surabaya	Weather, pilot error, runway overrun
Flight 904	Ngurah Rai International Airport	13 April 2013	Boeing 737-8GP	Bandung–Denpasar	Crew disorientation, crashed short of runway
Flight 610	Java Sea off Java	29 October 2018	Boeing 737 MAX 8	Jakarta–Pangkal Pinang	MCAS design flaw, improper maintenance, pilot error
Los Angeles Airways
Flight designation	Location	Date	Aircraft type	Route	Cause
Flight 841	Paramount, California	22 May 1968	Sikorsky S-61L		Main rotor blade separation, loss of control
Flight 417	Anaheim, California	14 August 1968	Sikorsky S-61L		Main rotor hub failure, loss of control
LOT Polish Airlines
Flight designation	Location	Date	Aircraft type	Route	Cause
SP-AYB	Malakasa, Greece	1 December 1936	Lockheed 10A Electra	Warsaw-Bucharest-Athens	CFIT
SP-AYA	Susiec	28 December 1936	Lockheed 10A Electra	Lwów (now Lviv)-Warsaw	Icing, CFIT
SP-AYD	near Warsaw	11 November 1937	Lockheed 10A Electra	Kraków-Warsaw	Poor visibility, CFIT
SP-ASJ	Pirin Mountains	23 November 1937	Douglas DC-2-115D	Athens–Thessaloniki–Sofia–Warsaw	CFIT
SP-BNG	Negrileasa, Stulpicani	22 July 1938	Lockheed 14H Super Electra	Warsaw-Lwów (now Lviv)-Czerniowce (now Chernovtsy)-Bucharest-Thessaloniki	Possible lightning strike
SP-LKA	Tuszyn	15 November 1951	Lisunov Li-2P	Lodz-Kraków	Weather, pilot error (official); Engine failure, loss of control (unofficial)
SP-LAH	near Gruszowiec	19 March 1954	Lisunov Li-2P	Warsaw-Kraków	Spatial disorientation, CFIT
Flight 232	Vnukovo Int'l Airport	14 June 1957	Ilyushin Il-14P	Warsaw-Moscow	Weather, poor visibility, crew error
SP-LVB	near Warsaw-Okecie Airport	19 December 1962	Vickers Viscount 804	Brussels-East Berlin-Warsaw	Stall, loss of control
SP-LVA	near Jeuk, Belgium	20 August 1965	Vickers Viscount 804	Lille-Wroclaw	Weather, loss of control, possible turbulence
Flight 165	near Zawoja	2 April 1969	Antonov An-24B	Warsaw-Kraków	Weather, CFIT
Flight 165	Tempelhof Int'l Airport	30 August 1978	Tupolev Tu-134	Gdansk-East Berlin	Hijacking
Flight 007; Mikołaj Kopernik	near Warsaw-Okecie Airport	14 March 1980	Ilyushin Il-62	New York City-Warsaw	Engine failure, loss of control
Flight 5055; Tadeusz Kościuszko	near Warsaw-Okecie Airport	9 May 1987	Ilyushin Il-62M	Warsaw-New York City	Engine failure, in-flight fire, loss of control
Flight 703; Dunajec	near Rzeszów	2 November 1988	Antonov An-24B	Warsaw-Rzeszow	Icing, engine failure
Flight 702	Rzeszów-Jasionka Airport	25 February 1993	ATR 72-202	Rzeszow-Warsaw	Hijacking
Flight 016; Poznań	Warsaw Chopin Airport	1 November 2011	Boeing 767-35DER	Newark-Warsaw	Landing gear failure, belly landing
Lufthansa
Flight designation	Location	Date	Aircraft type	Route	Cause
Flight 502	Rio de Janeiro-Galeão International Airport	11 January 1959	Lockheed L-1049G Super Constellation	Hamburg–Frankfurt–Paris–Lisbon–Dakar–Rio de Janeiro–Buenos Aires	Pilot error, crew fatigue
D-ABOK	near Ebersheim	4 December 1961	Boeing 720-030B	Frankfurt-Cologne	Nose dived for reasons unknown
D-ABOP	near Ansbach	15 July 1964	Boeing 720-030B	None	Loss of control
Flight 005	Bremen Airport	28 January 1966	Convair CV-440-0	Frankfurt–Bremen	Stall, loss of control
Flight 649	Aden	22–23 February 1972	Boeing 747-230	Tokyo–Hong Kong–Bangkok–Delhi–Athens–Frankfurt	Hijacking
Flight 615	Zagreb	29 October 1972	Boeing 727-30	Damascus–Beirut–Ankara–Munich–Frankfurt	Hijacking
Flight 540	Nairobi	20 November 1974	Boeing 747-130	Frankfurt–Nairobi–Johannesburg	Mechanical failure, pilot error
Flight 181; Landshut	Mogadishu	17 October 1977	Boeing 737-230C	Palma de Mallorca–Frankfurt	Hijacking
Flight 527	near Rio de Janeiro	26 July 1979	Boeing 707-330C	Rio de Janeiro–Dakar	ATC errors, CFIT
Flight 2904	Warsaw Chopin Airport	14 September 1993	Airbus A320-200	Frankfurt–Warsaw	Pilot error, deficiencies in braking system
Luxair
Flight designation	Location	Date	Aircraft type	Route	Cause
Flight 9642	Niederanven	6 November 2002	Fokker 50	Berlin–Luxembourg	Weather, pilot error

== M ==
Maddux Air Lines
Flight designation	Location	Date	Aircraft type	Route	Cause
NC9636	over San Diego	21 April 1929	Ford 5-AT-B Tri-Motor	San Diego-Phoenix	Mid-air collision with a USAAF Boeing PW-9D
Flight 7	Oceanside, California	19 January 1930	Ford 5-AT-C Tri-Motor	Tijuana-Los Angeles	Windshear
Mahan Air
Malaysian Airline System/Malaysia Airlines
Flight designation	Location	Date	Aircraft type	Route	Cause
Flight 653	Johor	4 December 1977	Boeing 737-2H6	Penang-Kuala Lumpur	Hijacking, loss of control
Flight 684	Subang, Petaling	18 December 1983	Airbus A300B4-120	Singapore-Kuala Lumpur	Weather, crashed short of runway
Flight 2133	Tawau Airport	15 September 1995	Fokker 50	Kota Kinabalu-Tawau	Pilot error
Flight 370	southern Indian Ocean	8 March 2014	Boeing 777-2H6ER	Kuala Lumpur–Beijing	Under investigation (unexplained disappearance)
Flight 17	over Ukraine	17 July 2014	Boeing 777-2H6ER	Amsterdam–Kuala Lumpur	Shot down
Malév Hungarian Airlines
Flight designation	Location	Date	Aircraft type	Route	Cause
HA-LII	Bratroňov	23 December 1954	Lisunov Li-2	Budapest–Prague–Berlin	Icing, wheels-up landing
HA-LIF	Polná	23 December 1954	Lisunov Li-2	Budapest–Prague–Berlin	Icing, wheels-up landing
Flight 622	Ingolstadt Air Base	13 July 1956	Lisunov Li-2T	Budapest–Szombathely	Hijacking
HA-LID	Szombathely	13 October 1956	Lisunov Li-2	Budapest–Szombathely–Zalaegerszeg	Hijacking
HA-TSA	Budapest	6 August 1961	Douglas C-47A	None	Crew negligence, loss of control
Flight 355	near Le Bourget Airport	23 November 1962	Ilyushin Il-18V	Budapest–Frankfurt–Paris	Stall on approach for reasons unknown
HA-MAH	Ferihegy Airport	17 February 1964	VEB 14P	None	Burned in hangar fire
Flight 731	off Saltholm Island	28 August 1971	Ilyushin Il-18V	Oslo–Copenhagen–East Berlin–Budapest	Premature descent, CFIT
Flight 110	near Boryspil Airport	16 September 1971	Tupolev Tu-134	Budapest–Kiev	Poor visibility, CFIT
Flight 801	near Ferihegy Airport	15 January 1975	Ilyushin Il-18V	East Berlin–Budapest	Weather, poor visibility, poor CRM, possible spatial disorientation
Flight 240	off Lebanon	30 September 1975	Tupolev Tu-154A	Budapest-Beirut	Unknown
Flight 203	near Urziceni	21 September 1977	Tupolev Tu-134	Istanbul–Bucharest–Budapest	Pilot error, CFIT
Flight 262	Thessaloniki Int'l Airport	4 July 2000	Tupolev Tu-154B-2	Budapest–Thessaloniki	Pilot error, belly landing
Manchukuo National Airways
Flight designation	Location	Date	Aircraft type	Route	Cause
M-604	Sea of Japan	21 June 1941	Mitsubishi MC-20		CFIT
Mandala Airlines
Flight designation	Location	Date	Aircraft type	Route	Cause
Flight 091	Medan, Indonesia	5 September 2005	Boeing 737-200	Medan-Jakarta	Pilot error, stall, loss of control
Mandarin Airlines
Flight designation	Location	Date	Aircraft type	Route	Cause
Flight 369	Magong Airport	17 August 2013	Embraer ERJ-190-100 IGW	Taipei-Magong	Runway excursion
Martinair
Flight designation	Location	Date	Aircraft type	Route	Cause
Flight 495	Faro Airport, Portugal	21 December 1992	McDonnell Douglas DC-10-30CF	Amsterdam–Faro	Windshear, thunderstorm, rain
Maszovlet
Flight designation	Location	Date	Aircraft type	Route	Cause
HA-LIK	Pogany Airport	1 November 1949	Lisunov Li-2P	Budaörs–Pecs	Pilot error, CFIT
HA-LIL	Nyíregyháza Airport	2 October 1952	Lisunov Li-2P		Struck building on landing
Merpati Nusantara Airlines
Flight designation	Location	Date	Aircraft type	Route	Cause
PK-MVS; Sabang	off Padang, Indonesia	10 November 1971	Vickers Viscount 828	Jakarta–Padang	CFIT
Flight 422	Achmad Yani International Airport	30 November 1994	Fokker F28		Runway overrun
Flight 9760	near Oksibil	2 August 2009	de Havilland Canada Twin Otter 300		CFIT
Flight 836	Sorong Airport	13 April 2010	Boeing 737-322		Runway overrun
Flight 8968	off West Papua	7 May 2011	Xian MA60		Missed approach, crew error, CFIT
Flight 536	Sampit Airport	7 January 2012	Xian MA60		Ran off runway
Metro Airlines
Flight designation	Location	Date	Aircraft type	Route	Cause
N853SA	Scholes Field	30 April 1974	Beechcraft Model 99	Galveston-Houston	Pilot error, loss of control
N935MA	Beaumont Municipal Airport	20 May 1983	Short 330-100		Destroyed by a tornado (while parked)
Mexicana de Aviación
Flight designation	Location	Date	Aircraft type	Route	Cause
X-ABCO	near Amecameca de Juarez	26 March 1936	Ford 5-AT-B Trimotor	Mexico City-Guatemala City	CFIT
XA-DOT	Iztaccihuatl Volcano	11 August 1945	Douglas DC-2-243	Tapachula-Puebla	Weather, CFIT
XA-DUH	Mount Popocatepetl	26 September 1949	Douglas DC-3A	Tapachula-Tuxtla Gutierrez-Ixtepec-Oaxaca-Mexico City	CFIT
XA-DUK	Cerro del Borrago	16 December 1949	Douglas DC-3A	Mexico City-Mérida	CFIT
Flight 591	Cerro del Cabre mountains	8 March 1955	Douglas DC-3A-228D	Puerto Vallarta-Talpa-Mascota-Guadalajara	Poor visibility, CFIT
Flight 621	Poza Rica	8 September 1959	Douglas DC-3A	Mexico City-Mérida	Bombing
XA-HUS	near Juchitpec	28 September 1960	Douglas C-53	Tapachula-Mexico City	CFIT
Flight 704	Apodaca, Nuevo Leon	4 June 1969	Boeing 727-64	Mexico City-Monterrey	Pilot error, CFIT
Flight 801	Mexico City	21 September 1969	Boeing 727-64	Chicago-Mexico City	Undetermined
Flight 940	Sierra Madre Oriental, Mexico	31 March 1986	Boeing 727-264	Mexico City-Puerto Vallarta-Mazatlan-Los Angeles	Blown landing gear tire, in-flight fire, loss of control
Miami Airlines
Flight designation	Location	Date	Aircraft type	Route	Cause
N1678M	Elizabeth, New Jersey	16 December 1951	Curtiss C-46F	Newark–Tampa	Engine fire, loss of power, stall, loss of control
MIAT Mongolian Airlines
Flight designation	Location	Date	Aircraft type	Route	Cause
MONGOL-105	Otgontenger	4 August 1963	Avia 14 Super	Ulaanbaatar–Tsetserleg–Uliastai	CFIT
BNMAU-4206	Khovd Province	17 September 1973	Antonov An-24B		CFIT
BNMAU-1202	Erdenet Airport	1 May 1979	Antonov An-24B		Runway overrun
BNMAU-8401	Buyant-Ukhaa International Airport	25 June 1983	Antonov An-24RV	Khovd-Ulaanbaatar	Engine problems on approach, runway excursion
BNMAU-7710	Buyant-Ukhaa International Airport	23 January 1987	Antonov An-24RV		Crashed on landing
BNMAU-10208	near Ulaangom Airport	26 January 1990	Antonov An-24RV	Ulaanbaatar–Uliastai	Navigation error, fuel exhaustion, forced landing
BNMAU-14102	Marz Mountain	23 April 1993	Antonov An-26	Ulaanbaatar–Ölgii	Premature descent, CFIT
Flight 557	Choho Geologloh Uul	21 September 1995	Antonov An-24RV	Ulaanbaatar–Mörön	Premature descent, CFIT
Flight 447	Mandalgovi Airport	10 June 1997	Harbin Y-12 II	Ulaanbaatar–Mandalgovi–Dalanzadgad	Windshear, loss of control
JU-1017	near Erdenet	26 May 1998	Harbin Y-12 II	Erdenet–Mörön	Pilot error, CFIT
Misrair (now Egyptair)
Flight designation	Location	Date	Aircraft type	Route	Cause
SU-AHH	Tehran	22 December 1951	SNCASE SE.161 Languedoc	Baghdad-Tehran	Weather
SU-AFK	near Cairo	15 December 1953	Vickers Type 634 Viking 1B	Cairo-Luxor	Crash on takeoff
SU-AGN	Manzala Lake	7 March 1958	Vickers Type 628 Viking 1B	Athens-Cairo	Weather, CFIT
Middle East Airlines (MEA)
Flight designation	Location	Date	Aircraft type	Route	Cause
OD-ADB	Mediterranean Sea	29 September 1958	Avro York I	Beirut–Rome–London	Unexplained disappearance
Flight 265	over Ankara	1 February 1963	Vickers Viscount 754D	Nicosia-Ankara	Mid-air collision with a Turkish Air Force Douglas C-47
Flight 444	near Dhahran	17 April 1964	Sud Aviation Caravelle III	Beirut-Dhahran	CFIT for reasons unknown
Flight 438	Qaisumah	1 January 1976	Boeing 720B	Beirut-Dubai-Muscat	Bombing
Mohawk Airlines
Flight designation	Location	Date	Aircraft type	Route	Cause
Flight 121	Rochester, New York	2 July 1963	Martin 4-0-4	Rochester–Newark	Weather, pilot error
Flight 40	Blossburg, Pennsylvania	23 June 1967	BAC 1–11-204AF	Syracuse–Elmira–Washington DC	Mechanical failure, in-flight fire, structural failure, loss of control
Flight 411	Pilot Knob, New York	19 November 1969	Fairchild FH-227B	Albany–Glens Falls	Pilot error, CFIT
Flight 405	Albany, New York	3 March 1972	Fairchild FH-227B	New York City–Albany	Mechanical failure, pilot error

== N ==
National Airlines
Flight designation	Location	Date	Aircraft type	Route	Cause
NC33349	Peter O. Knight Airport	13 September 1945	Lockheed 18-50 Lodestar	Miami–Tampa	Runway overrun
Flight 16	Lakeland, Florida	5 October 1945	Lockheed 18-50 Lodestar	Tampa–Lakeland	Pilot error, overshot runway
Flight 23	Banana River Naval Air Station	11 October 1945	Lockheed 18-50 Lodestar	Jacksonville–Miami	Engine fire, pilot error
Flight 83	Philadelphia Int'l Airport	14 January 1951	Douglas DC-4-1009	Newark–Philadelphia–Norfolk	Pilot error, runway overrun
Flight 101	Newark Int'l Airport	11 February 1952	Douglas DC-6	Newark–Miami	Propeller failure, loss of altitude
Flight 470	Gulf of Mexico off Mobile, Alabama	14 February 1953	Douglas DC-6	Miami–Tampa–New Orleans	Weather, severe turbulence, in-flight breakup (possibly flew into a waterspout)
Flight 967 (leased from Delta Air Lines)	Gulf of Mexico off Pilottown, Louisiana	16 November 1959	Douglas DC-7B	Tampa–New Orleans	Unexplained in-flight explosion, possible bombing
Flight 2511	near Bolivia, North Carolina	6 January 1960	Douglas DC-6B	New York City–Miami	Suicide bombing (suspected)
Flight 27; Barbara	over Datil, New Mexico	3 November 1973	Douglas DC-10-10	Miami–New Orleans–Houston–Las Vegas–San Francisco	Uncontained engine failure, explosive decompression
Flight 193; Donna	Escambia Bay, Florida	8 May 1978	Boeing 727-235	Miami–Melbourne–Tampa–New Orleans–Mobile–Pensacola	Pilot error, poor CRM, CFIT
National Air Cargo
Flight designation	Location	Date	Aircraft type	Route	Cause
Flight 662 (operated for Transafrik)	near Kabul	12 October 2010	Lockheed L-100-20 Hercules	Bagram AB–Kabul	CFIT
Flight 102; Lori	Bagram Air Base	29 April 2013	Boeing 747-428BCF	Chateauroux–Camp Bastion–Bagram AB–Dubai	Shifted load, stall, loss of control
Nationair
Flight designation	Location	Date	Aircraft type	Route	Cause
Flight 2120 (operated by Nigeria Airways)	King Abdulaziz Int'l Airport	11 July 1991	Douglas DC-8-61	Jeddah–Sokoto	Fire, loss of control
Nepal Airlines
Flight designation	Location	Date	Aircraft type	Route	Cause
Flight 555	Jomsom Airport	16 May 2013	de Havilland Canada Twin Otter	Pokhara–Jomsom	Runway overrun
Flight 183	near Dhikura	16 February 2014	de Havilland Canada Twin Otter	Pokhara–Jumla	Pilot error, CFIT
Nihon Kinkyori Airways
Flight designation	Location	Date	Aircraft type	Route	Cause
Flight 497	Nakashibetsu Airport	11 March 1983	NAMC YS-11A-208	Sapporo–Nakashibetsu	Pilot error, crashed short of runway
NLM CityHopper (now KLM Cityhopper)
Flight designation	Location	Date	Aircraft type	Route	Cause
Flight 431	Moerdijk	6 October 1981	Fokker F28-4000	Rotterdam–Eindhoven–Hamburg	Weather, extreme turbulence, wing separation (flew into a tornado)
Nitto Aviation
Flight designation	Location	Date	Aircraft type	Route	Cause
JA3115	Awaji Island	1 May 1963	de Havilland Canada Otter	Osaka–Tokushima	Poor visibility, navigation error, CFIT
JA5067	near Itami Airport	18 February 1964	Grumman Mallard	Osaka–Tokushima	Engine failure, stall, loss of control
Northeast Airlines
Flight designation	Location	Date	Aircraft type	Route	Cause
Flight 792	Berlin, New Hampshire	30 November 1954	Douglas DC-3A	Boston–Concord–Laconia–Berlin	Pilot error
Flight 823	Rikers Island, New York	1 February 1957	Douglas DC-6A	New York City–Miami	Pilot error, CFIT
Flight 285	New Bedford, Massachusetts	15 September 1957	Douglas C-53 (DC-3)	Martha's Vineyard–New Bedford	Pilot error
Flight 258	near Nantucket Memorial Airport	15 August 1958	Convair CV-240-2	New York City–Nantucket	Poor visibility, crash short of runway
Flight 946	Moose Mountain, New Hampshire	25 October 1968	Fairchild Hiller FH-227C	Boston–Lebanon–Montpelier	Pilot error
Northwest Airlines
Flight designation(s)	Location(s)	Date	Aircraft type(s)	Route	Cause
Flight 2	near Bozeman, Montana	10 January 1938	Lockheed L-14H Super Electra	Butte–Billings	In-flight breakup, design defect
NC17394	near Santa Clarita, California	16 May 1938	Lockheed L-14H2 Super Electra	Burbank–Las Vegas	Poor visibility, CFIT
Flight 4	Billings Municipal Airport	8 July 1938	Lockheed L-14H Super Electra	Billings–Fargo	Stall on takeoff
Flight 1	near Miles City, Montana	13 January 1939	Lockheed L-14H Super Electra	Miles City-Billings	In-flight fire
Flight 5	Moorhead, Minnesota	30 October 1941	Douglas DC-3A-269	Chicago–Minneapolis–Fargo–Billings–Butte–Spokane–Seattle	Icing, loss of control
43-15738 (leased from USAAF)	Mount Deception, Alaska	18 September 1944	Douglas C-47A	Anchorage–Fairbanks	CFIT
45-922 (leased from USAAF)	near Billings, Montana	8 December 1945	Douglas C-47B	Fargo–Billings	Weather, CFIT
Flight 4422	Mount Sanford	12 March 1948	Douglas C-54G	Shanghai–Anchorage–New York City	CFIT
Flight 421	Fountain City, Wisconsin	29 August 1948	Martin 2-0-2	Chicago–Minneapolis	Structural failure
Flight 6427	34 mi N of Edmonton	27 October 1948	Douglas C-54A	Minneapolis–Edmonton–Anchorage–Tokyo	Pilot error
Flight 255	Romulus, Michigan	16 August 1987	Douglas DC-9-82	Saginaw–Detroit–Phoenix–Santa Ana	Pilot error, failure to extend flaps and slats for takeoff
Flight 1482	Detroit Metropolitan Wayne County Airport	3 December 1990	Douglas DC-9-14	Detroit–Pittsburgh	Runway collision with a Northwest Boeing 727
Flight 957 and Flight 7	Seattle and Memphis	28 October 1998	Both Airbus A320s		Hazardous material leakage
Flight 85	Anchorage, Alaska	9 October 2002	Boeing 747-451	Detroit–Tokyo	Metal fatigue, rudder malfunction
Flight 188	over Minnesota	21 October 2009	Airbus A320-211	San Diego–Minneapolis	Pilot distraction, pilot error
Flight 253	Detroit Metropolitan Wayne County Airport	25 December 2009	Airbus A330-323X	Amsterdam–Detroit	Attempted bombing
Northwest Orient Airlines
Flight designation(s)	Location(s)	Date	Aircraft type(s)	Route	Cause
Flight 1	Miles City, Montana	12 May 1942	Douglas DC-3A-269	Chicago–Miles City	Runway overrun
Flight 307	near Minneapolis-Saint Paul Int'l Airport	7 March 1950	Martin 2-0-2	Washington–Detroit–Madison–Rochester–Minneapolis–Winnipeg	CFIT
Flight 2501	Lake Michigan	23 June 1950	Douglas DC-4 (former C-54)	New York City–Minneapolis–Spokane–Seattle	Unexplained disappearance
Flight 163	Billings Airport	4 September 1950	Martin 2-0-2	Minneapolis–Billings–Bozeman–Seattle	Hydraulic fluid leak, in-flight fire, loss of control
NC93037	Almelund, Minnesota	13 October 1950	Martin 2-0-2	None	Mechanical failure, reversal of propeller in flight
Flight 115	near Butte, Montana	7 November 1950	Martin 2-0-2	Chicago–Minneapolis–Billings–Great Falls–Helena–Butte–Seattle	Crew error
Flight 115	near Reardan, Washington	16 January 1951	Martin 2-0-2	Minneapolis–Seattle	Loss of control for reasons unknown
Flight 324	off Sandspit, British Columbia	19 January 1952	Douglas C-54E	Tokyo–Shemya–Anchorage–Tacoma	Icing
Flight 2 Stratocruiser Tokyo	Puget Sound	2 April 1956	Boeing 377 Stratocruiser 10-30	Seattle–Portland–Chicago–New York City	Crew error, water ditching
Flight 710	near Cannelton, Indiana	17 March 1960	Lockheed L-188C Electra	Minneapolis–Chicago–Miami	Turbulence, in-flight breakup
Flight 1–11 (operated by USAF)	off Manila	14 July 1960	Douglas DC-7C	New York City–Seattle–Anchorage–Cold Bay–Tokyo–Okinawa–Manila	Engine failure, in-flight fire, water ditching
Flight 104	20 mi W of Missoula, Montana	28 October 1960	Douglas C-54A	Spokane–Missoula	Pilot error
Flight 706	Chicago	17 September 1961	Lockheed L-188C Electra	Milwaukee–Chicago–Tampa–Fort Lauderdale	Maintenance error
Flight 293	off Biorka Island, Alaska	22 October 1962	Douglas DC-7CF	Tacoma–Anchorage	Engine failure, water ditching
Flight 705	Everglades	12 February 1963	Boeing 720-051B	Miami–Chicago–Spokane–Seattle	Severe turbulence, loss of control, in-flight breakup
Flight 293 (operated by USAF)	Pacific Ocean	3 June 1963	Douglas DC-7CF	Tacoma–Anchorage	Unexplained disappearance
Flight 305	Portland Int'l Airport	24 November 1971	Boeing 727-51	Portland–Seattle	Hijacking
Flight 6231	Stony Point	1 December 1974	Boeing 727-251	New York City–Buffalo	Loss of control
Norwegian Air Lines (DNL)
Flight designation(s)	Location(s)	Date	Aircraft type(s)	Route	Cause
LN-DAE; Havørn	Lihesten	12 June 1936	Junkers Ju 52/3mW	Bergen–Trondheim	CFIT
LN-LAB	Fornebu Airport	22 May 1946	Junkers Ju 52/3m2e	Oslo–Stockholm	Engine failure, stall, loss of control
LN-IAV; Kvitbjørn	Lødingsfjellet	28 August 1947	Short Sandringham 6	Tromsø–Harstad–Bodø–Oslo	CFIT
LN-IAW; Bukken Bruse	Hommelvik	2 October 1948	Short Sandringham 5	Oslo–Trondheim	Loss of control, crash on landing

== O ==
One-Two-GO Airlines
Flight designation	Location	Date	Aircraft type	Route	Cause
Flight 269	Phuket Int'l Airport	16 September 2007	McDonnell Douglas MD-82	Bangkok–Phuket	Failed go-around, weather, crew disregard of procedure, poor CRM
Olympic Airlines
Flight designation	Location	Date	Aircraft type	Route	Cause
Flight 214	near Avlon Attiki	29 October 1959	Douglas C-47A	Athens–Thessaloniki	Engine failure, wing separation, loss of control
Flight 954	24 mi SE of Athens	8 December 1969	Douglas DC-6B	Chania–Athens	CFIT
Flight 506	near Ellinikon Int'l Airport	21 October 1972	NAMC YS-11A-500	Kerkyra–Athens	CFIT
Flight 830	12 mi SE of Philippos Airport	23 November 1976	NAMC YS-11A-500	Athens–Larissa–Kozani	Poor visibility, CFIT
Flight 417	After takeoff from Athens, Greece	4 January 1998	Boeing 747		Second-hand smoke and failure to re-seat a sensitive passenger killed the victim
Flight 3838	FIR Bucharest	14 September 1999	Dassault Falcon 900B	Athens–Bucharest	Mechanical failure, loss of control (oscillations)
Orbi Georgian Airways
Flight designation	Location	Date	Aircraft type	Route	Cause
4L-65809	Babusheri Airport	20 September 1993	Tupolev Tu-134A	None	Destroyed on the ground by Abkhaz forces
4L-85163	Babusheri Airport	22 September 1993	Tupolev Tu-154B	Tbilisi-Sukhumi	Shot down by the Abkhaz forces in the course of war, crashed on the runway
4L-85359	Babusheri Airport	23 September 1993	Tupolev Tu-154B-2	None	Destroyed on the ground

== See also ==
- Lists of disasters
