= Indian Airlines Flight 421 =

1984 terrorist hijacking

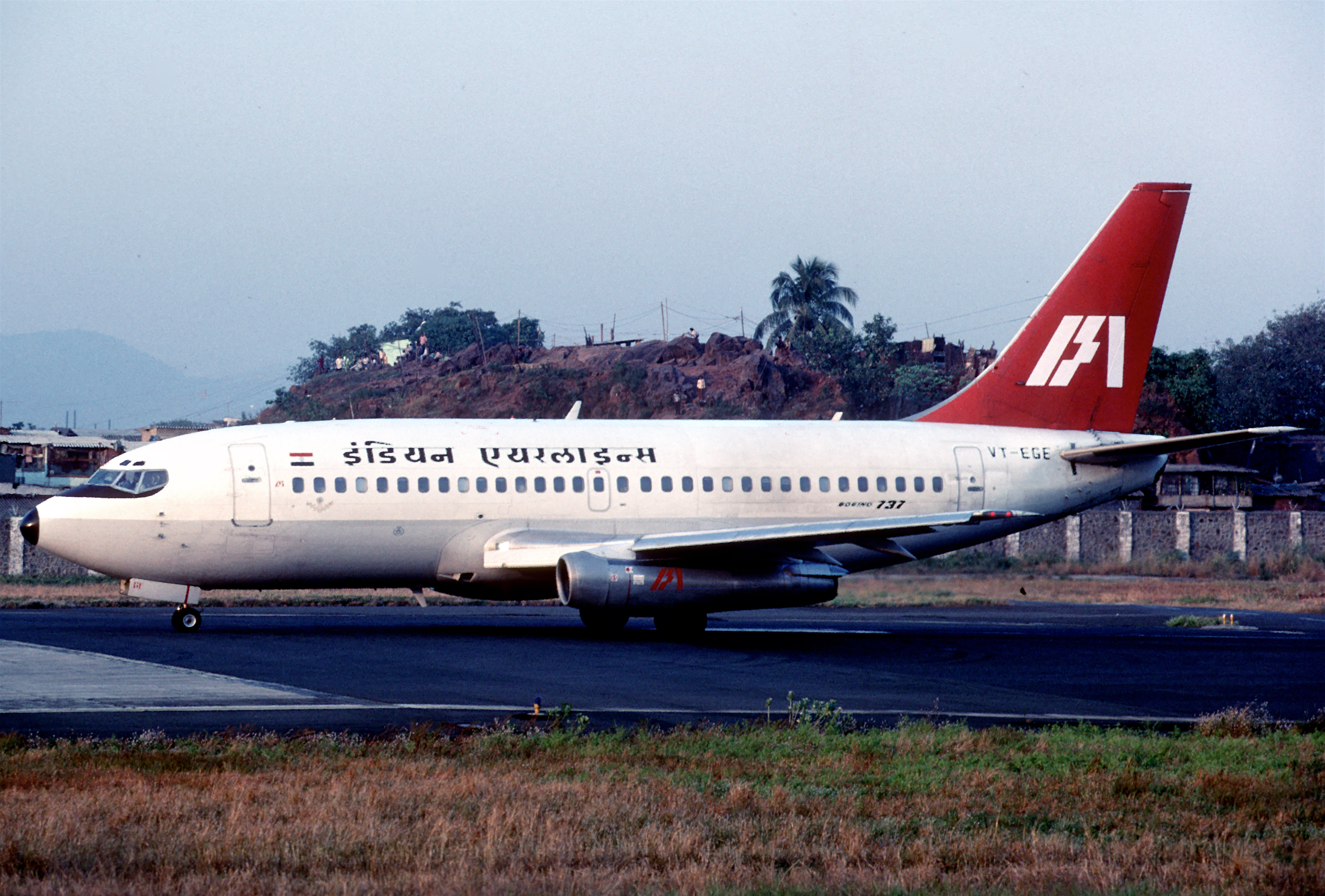
- An Indian Airlines Boeing 737-200, similar to the aircraft involved in the hijack

Hijacking
- Date: 24 August 1984
- Summary: Terrorist hijacking
- Site: Dubai Airport, UAE; 25°15′10″N 055°21′52″E

Aircraft
- Aircraft type: Boeing 737-2A8
- Operator: Indian Airlines
- IATA flight No.: IC421
- ICAO flight No.: IAC421
- Call sign: INDAIR 421
- Registration: VT-EFK
- Flight origin: Palam Airport
- 1st stopover: Lahore Airport
- 2nd stopover: Karachi Airport
- Last stopover: Dubai Airport
- Destination: Srinagar Airport
- Occupants: 74 (including the hijackers)
- Fatalities: 0
- Survivors: 74

On 24 August 1984, seven members of the banned All India Sikh Students Federation hijacked an Indian Airlines jetliner Indian Airlines Flight 421 (IATA No.: IC421), a Boeing 737-2A8, on a domestic flight from the Delhi-Palam Airport to Srinagar Airport with 74 people on board and demanded to be flown to the United States. The plane travelled to Lahore, then to Karachi and finally to Dubai, where the defence minister of the United Arab Emirates Mohammed bin Rashid Al Maktoum negotiated the release of the passengers and the surrender of all hijackers to UAE authorities.

It was related to the secessionist insurgency in the Indian state of Punjab. The Khalistan movement was a separatist movement in Indian Punjab and UK where a small portion of the Sikh community openly asked for a separate country for Sikhs (Khalistan). The hijackers were subsequently extradited by UAE to India. UAE authorities also handed over the pistol recovered from the hijackers.

Indian civil servant K. Subrahmanyam was on board the hijacked flight. The arrested hijackers later claimed in court that it was Subrahmanyam who "planned the entire hijacking to examine nuclear installations in Pakistan."

IC 421 hijacking was mentioned in the book IA's Terror Trail, written by Anil Sharma. Indian Airlines, India's sole domestic airline up to 1993, was hijacked 16 times, from 1971 to 1999.

This hijacking was an important part of the 2021 Indian film Bell Bottom.

== Aircraft ==
The aircraft, VT-EFK, was delivered to Indian Airlines in 1977. In 1996, the aircraft was transferred to PAHC, before the last delivered to Aerolineas Argentinas in 1997. The aircraft was used two Pratt & Whitney JT8D-17A, and was used as a setting for director Yash Chopra's film Silsila (1981).

== Timeline ==
Indian Airlines Flight 421 took off from Palam Airport at New Delhi with 122 passengers, bound for Srinagar via Chandigarh and Jammu in the early hours of 24 August 1984. At Chandigarh 67 passengers disembarked and 31 joined the flight for Jammu and Srinagar. At 7:30AM, seven Sikh passengers - described as being in their twenties and wielding kirpans - stormed into the cockpit and took control of the flight from Captain V.K. Mehta. On taking the cockpit, the hijackers forced the pilot to fly the aircraft to Amritsar and circle above the Golden Temple - the central shrine of the Sikh faith which had been raided in June that year by the Indian Army in an anti-terrorist operation. After two circles above the Golden Temple, the hijackers ordered the aircraft's pilot to fly to Lahore, Pakistan. At Lahore the aircraft had to circle the city for nearly 80 minutes before it was finally allowed to land by the Pakistani authorities at 9:50 AM due to dangerously low fuel levels.

Indian Prime Minister Indira Gandhi spoke with Pakistani President Muhammad Zia-ul-Haq and requested him not to allow the aircraft to leave Lahore airport. The Indian government believed that since the hijackers were lightly armed, they could have very easily been neutralized by having special forces storm the aircraft.

On meeting with Pakistani officials on the tarmac at Lahore, the hijackers demanded that the aircraft be re-fueled and flown to the United States. The Pakistanis agreed to refuel the aircraft, but advised that the aircraft lacked the range to fly to the Western Hemisphere. The hijackers allowed five passengers, including a three-member family, to leave the aircraft at Lahore. At 7 PM, one of the hijackers produced a revolver and used it to force Captain Mehta to take off from Lahore. Two British nationals on board the flight later recounted that Pakistani officials had handed a paper wrapped packet to the hijackers, and claimed that the revolver had been produced from this packet.

On departing from Lahore, the hijackers demanded that Captain Mehta fly them to Bahrain. When Mehta refused - citing unfavorable flying conditions - the aircraft was diverted to Karachi where it landed. At Karachi, the hijackers allowed two women holding British passports to leave the aircraft. After sitting on the tarmac for an hour where it was further re-fueled, the aircraft took off and headed for Dubai. On approaching Dubai airport, the UAE authorities refused permission to land, switching off the runway lights as well as the radio beacon, in spite of Mehta's repeated pleas. By 5 AM the next morning, the aircraft was again facing dangerously low fuel levels and the flight crew made announcements asking all passengers to prepare for a water landing. When Mehta informed the UAE authorities of his plans to ditch the aircraft in the waters off Dubai, permission was finally given to land. The aircraft landed at 4:55 AM local time with just five minutes of fuel left.

At 8 AM, UAE Defence Minister, Sheikh Mohammed Bin Rashid Al Maktoum, reached the airport's control tower and began negotiations with the hijackers. At 10:05 AM, a white Mercedes car was sent to the aircraft and returned with one of the hijackers for face-to-face negotiations with Sheikh Rashid inside the airport terminal building. At 11:40 AM, a van filled with food and water for the hostages was dispatched, but this was turned back by the hijackers. At 12:35 PM, two ambulances were summoned to the aircraft when one of its passengers - K. Subrahmanyam, director of the Delhi-based Institute for Defence Studies and Analysis - complained that he required insulin injections for his diabetes. Subrahmanyam and an accompanying hijacker returned to the aircraft after the insulin dose was administered inside one of the ambulances.

At 1:45 PM, after repeated requests from Sheikh Rashid, the hijackers finally allowed food and water to be brought on board for the hostages.

During negotiations with the UAE authorities, the hijackers demanded safe passage to the United States as well as political asylum there. The US Consul General in Dubai, David Stockwell, reached the airport during the negotiations but later announced that "Our position is very clear. If they go to the US, they will be arrested." At one point in the negotiations, the hijackers wanted to be flown to London and the authorities began to make plans for a refueling stop in Istanbul.

At 2:30 PM, the hijackers forced Subrahmanyam to convey to the negotiators over radio their intention to commence execution of one hostage every half hour - starting with Subrahmanyam - if their demands were not met. However, no executions were carried out. At 4 PM, two of the hijackers were taken to the terminal building for further negotiations, and at 5:30 PM when they had not yet returned, the remaining hijackers threatened to detonate an explosive device on board the aircraft. At 5:55 PM both the hijackers returned to the aircraft, leaving again at 6:20 PM only to return after 10 minutes.

At 6:50 PM, Dubai Chief of Police Colonel Dahi Khalfan Tamim announced to the press that the hijackers had been put under protective custody and that they had surrendered unconditionally. At 7 PM, two Dubai National Airlines Transport Authority passenger coaches arrived and all passengers and crew members were taken to the terminal building. The hijackers were then detained by the UAE authorities. The UAE authorities initially promised a seven-day asylum to the hijackers before their departure to the United States. In subsequent discussions with UAE and Indian officials, the hijackers were given two options: extradition back to India, or prosecution for air piracy under UAE law. All hijackers were later extradited to India.

== In popular culture ==
This hijacking was an important part of the 2021 Indian film Bell Bottom. In this movie, the flight is fictionalized as IC 691 and operated by an Airbus A321-200. The film also depicts the hijacking as a confrontation between Indian intelligence and a Sikh separatists organization backed by Pakistani intelligence.

== See also ==
- List of hijackings of Indian aeroplanes § 1980s
- List of aircraft hijackings § 1980s
- List of accidents and incidents involving airliners by location § India
- List of accidents and incidents involving airliners by airline (D–O)#I
- List of accidents and incidents involving commercial aircraft § 1984
