= Santa Cruz Airport =

Santa Cruz Airport or Santacruz Airport may refer to:

- Santa Cruz Airport (Argentina), serving Santa Cruz and Puerto Santa Cruz
- Santa Cruz Airport (Chile), serving Santa Cruz
- Santa Cruz Airfield (Portugal), an aerodrome in Torres Vedras
- Santa Cruz Island Airport, in Santa Barbara, California, US
- Chhatrapati Shivaji Maharaj International Airport, located in Santacruz, a suburb of Mumbai, India
- Viru Viru International Airport, serving Santa Cruz de la Sierra, Bolivia
