= Indian Airlines Flight 427 =

1993 aircraft hijacking

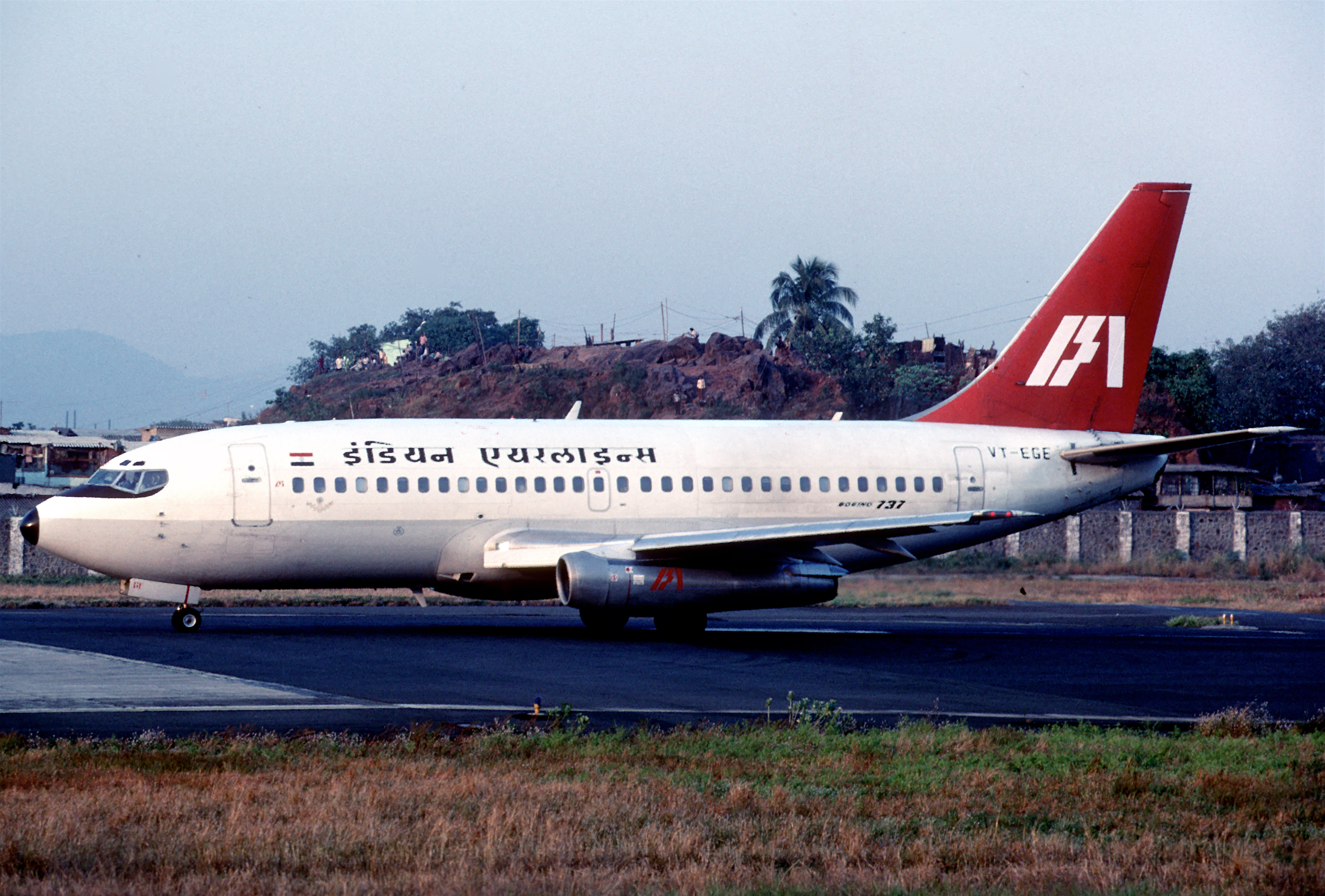
- An Indian Airlines Boeing 737-200, similar to the aircraft involved in the hijack

Hijacking
- Date: April 24 – 25, 1993
- Summary: Hijacking
- Site: Raja Sansi Airport, Amritsar, India; 31°42′28″N 074°47′57″E

Aircraft
- Aircraft type: Boeing 737-2A8
- Operator: Indian Airlines
- IATA flight No.: IC427
- Registration: VT-EDS
- Flight origin: Srinagar Airport, Jammu and Kashmir, India
- Destination: Indira Gandhi International Airport, Delhi, India
- Occupants: 141
- Passengers: 135 (including the hijacker)
- Crew: 6
- Fatalities: 1 (hijacker)
- Injuries: 0
- Survivors: 140

Indian Airlines Flight 427 was a domestic passenger flight of the Indian Airlines between Srinagar Airport and the Delhi-Indira Gandhi International Airport. The aircraft was involved in an aircraft hijacking that took place in India between 24 and 25 April 1993. Commandos from the National Security Guard (NSG) rescued all 141 hostages of the Indian Airlines Boeing 737, on the ground at Amritsar airport (where it was forced to land after being denied overflight permission by Pakistan to reach Kabul). The lone hijacker, Mohammad Yousuf, was killed within 3 minutes of commandos entering the plane, before he could react and harm any of the hostages. The rescue was code-named Operation Ashwamedh.

== Hijacking ==
Indian Airlines Flight IC427 departed Delhi at 13:57 for Srinagar with 6 crew members and 135 passengers on board. During the flight, a passenger, who first identified himself as Syed Salauddin, claimed that he was carrying pistols and a hand grenade, and asked the plane to be flown to Kabul. At 14:43, the Delhi Air Traffic Control received a message that the plane had been hijacked and was heading for Kabul in Afghanistan.

The Lahore Air Traffic Control refused to permit the plane to enter the Pakistani airspace, and the flight returned to India after circling over Lahore. Eventually, the plane landed at Amritsar in India at 15:20. The hijacker demanded refueling, and again asked for the plane to be flown to Kabul. The Crisis Management Group (CMG) at the Cabinet Secretariat of India and the Central Committee at Delhi Airport responded to the situation. The Deputy Commissioner and the Senior Superintendent of Police of the Amritsar district were sent to the airport to negotiate with the hijacker. At 18:00, the Director General of Punjab Police arrived in Amrtisar, and took charge of the negotiation process. However, the hijacker remained adamant on his demand, and even fired a warning shot which pierced through the body of the aircraft.

== NSG operation ==
The negotiations with the hijacker were done by Sri.M.R.Sivaraman I A S a member of the CMG a former DGCA and current revenue secretary of India from the Cabinet secretariat. The negotiations continued the whole day long and the hijacker insisted on the aircraft being flown to Pakistan. The negotiator spoke to Pakistan DGCA and they refused entry to the aircraft. The hijacker's request for the aircraft to be flown back to Delhi was also rejected. In the meanwhile, the CMG had moved a crack NSG team from Delhi to Amritsar and positioned it strategically. After the hijacker fired a shot, the negotiator warned the hijacker of dire consequences and asked him to surrender which he refused. The CMG then informed the PM that the aircraft would be stormed. The negotiator then issued the order to the NSG's crack 52 Special Action Group team to storm the aircraft and take down the hijacker. The hijacker was surprised by the sudden entry of the commandos into the plane. Before he could react he was taken down. The operation ended in five minutes, at 01:05, without any casualty or injury to any hostage or further damage to the aircraft.

== Aftermath ==
The hijacker, later identified as Jalaluddin alias Mohammed Yunus Shah, was shot dead by NSG. Two loaded 9 mm pistols and a grenade were recovered from him. The Indian authorities claimed the hijacker was a member of Hizbul Mujahideen, but the group denied responsibility.

== See also ==
- List of hijackings of Indian aeroplanes
- List of aircraft hijackings
- List of accidents and incidents involving airliners by location
- List of accidents and incidents involving airliners by airline
- List of accidents and incidents involving commercial aircraft
