= List of accidents and incidents involving airliners by airline (A–C) =

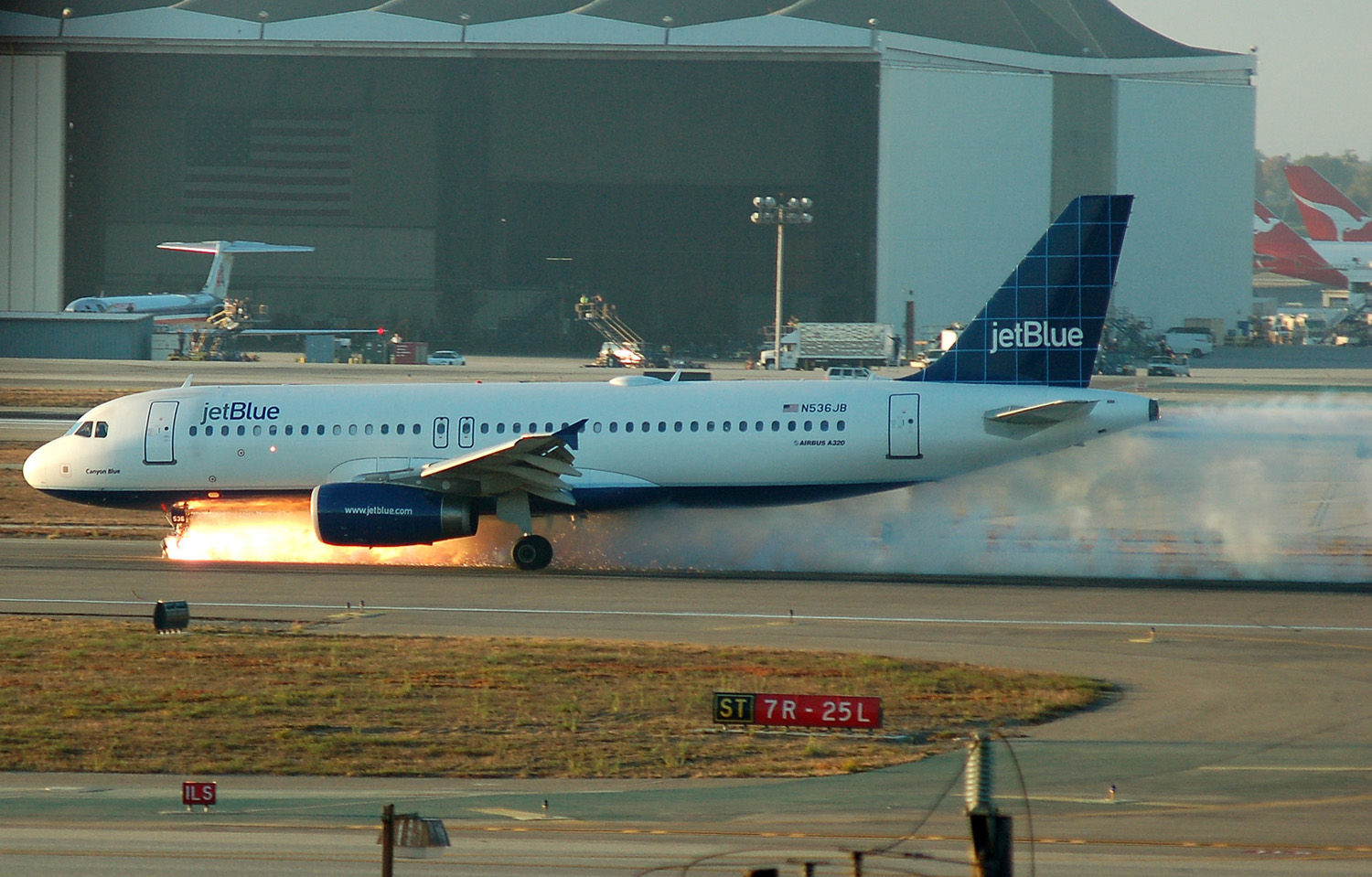
JetBlue Flight 292 making an emergency landing in September 2005 with its nose landing gear turned sideways.

This list of accidents and incidents involving airliners by airline summarizes airline accidents and all kinds of minor incidents by airline company with flight number, location, date, aircraft type, and cause.

This list is dynamic and by no means complete!

While all of the incidents in this list are noteworthy, not all the incidents listed involved fatalities.

The flight had no casualties.

The flight had at least one casualty but at least one person on board survived.

The flight ended with the deaths of everyone on board.

== 0-9 ==
09 Charlie Inc.
Flight designation	Location	Date	Aircraft type	Route	Cause
N4809C	off South Caicos	14 July 1978	Convair CV-440	Unknown	Undetermined, crashed into the sea
10 Tanker Air Carrier
Flight designation	Location	Date	Aircraft type	Route	Cause
N450AX	near Tehachapi	25 June 2007	McDonnell Douglas DC-10-10	Victorville-Victorville	Pilot error, impacted some trees
2M Leasing LLC
Flight designation	Location	Date	Aircraft type	Route	Cause
N126MT	Orlando	30 March 2018	Cessna 650 Citation III	Macon-Orlando	Collision on the ground
2nd Arkhangelsk United Aviation Division
Flight designation	Location	Date	Aircraft type	Route	Cause
Flight 718	Shoyna Airport	24 September 2014	Antonov An-2	Shoyna Airport-Vaskovo Airport	Crashed on take-off
Flight 9135	near Arkhangelsk	8 November 2018	Antonov An-2R	Vaskovo Airport-Unknown	Pilot error, icing, crashed in a forest
Flight 741	Nes	2 September 2022	Antonov An-2R	Arkhangelsk-Unknown	Damaged during landing
2nd Sverdlovsk Aviation Enterprise
Flight designation	Location	Date	Aircraft type	Route	Cause
RA-33565	near Gari	26 December 2006	Antonov An-2R	Puksinka Airfield-Unknown	Undetermined
RA-07331	Uktus Airport	20 December 2010	Antonov An-2P	None	Destroyed during a hangar collapse due to snow
RA-07637	Uktus Airport	20 December 2010	Antonov An-2TP	None	Destroyed during a hangar collapse due to snow
40-Mile Air
Flight designation	Location	Date	Aircraft type	Route	Cause
N3125N	near Healy	27 April 1999	de Havilland Canada DHC-3 Otter	Fairbanks International Airport-Unknown	Pilot error, wind, narrow airstrip
748 Air Services
Flight designation	Location	Date	Aircraft type	Route	Cause
9L-LBG	Foxtrot Airstrip	14 February 1999	Hawker Siddeley HS-748-206 Andover CC2	Lokichoggo Airport-Foxtrot Airstrip	Runway excursion
3C-KKB	Rumbek	March 2003	Hawker Siddeley HS-780 Andover C.1	Unknown	Crash landed after engine failure
5Y-SFE	Lokichoggio Airport	10 June 2005	Hawker Siddeley HS-780 Andover C.1	Natinga Airport-Lokichoggio Airport	Pilot error, belly landing
9L-LFQ	Lokichoggio Airport	1 November 2006	Antonov An-12BP	Nairobi-Lokichoggio Airport	Pilot error, bounced landing leading to nose gear collapse
5Y-YKM	Tonj Airfield	20 December 2009	British Aerospace BAe-748-398 Srs. 2B	Juba Airport-Tonj Airfield	Runway excursion
987 Investments LLC
Flight designation	Location	Date	Aircraft type	Route	Cause
N987AK	Houston Executive Airport	19 October 2021	McDonnell Douglas MD-87	Houston-Boston	Jammed stabilizer during takeoff, leading to an attempted aborted takeoff, resulting in a runway overrun

== A ==
A & H Aircraft Sales
Flight designation	Location	Date	Aircraft type	Route	Cause
N500ML	Madison	13 November 1997	Beechcraft B100 King Air	Muscle Shoals-Jackson	Pilot error due to spatial disorientation, instrument weather conditions
A&C Big Sky Aviation LLC
Flight designation	Location	Date	Aircraft type	Route	Cause
N452DA	Near Teterboro Airport	15 May 2017	Learjet 35A	Philadelphia-Teterboro	Pilot error, stall
A. McVinish
Flight designation	Location	Date	Aircraft type	Route	Cause
VH-MMV	Toogoolawah Airport	8 January 1995	Cessna 208 Caravan I	None	Engine flame out due to pilot error
VH-MMV	near Nagambie	29 April 2001	Cessna 208 Caravan I	None	Premature parachuting leading to loss of control
A. Trichot
Flight designation	Location	Date	Aircraft type	Route	Cause
F-OHRM	N'Djamena Airport	18 September 2001	Cessna 208 Caravan I	None	Destroyed by wind
A.E. Stanley Manufacturing Co.
Flight designation	Location	Date	Aircraft type	Route	Cause
N805C	near Sun Valley Airport	3 January 1983	Canadair CL-600-1A11 Challenger 600	Decatur-Hailey	Pilot error, weather
A.R. Wings LLC
Flight designation	Location	Date	Aircraft type	Route	Cause
N518AR	Smithfield	13 October 2016	Cessna 525B CitationJet CJ3+	Pittsburgh-Smithfield	Pilot error, runway excursion
AAA Investments (Pty) Ltd
Flight designation	Location	Date	Aircraft type	Route	Cause
ZS-PCM	near Nyala Lodge Airstrip	1 November 2008	Cessna 208B Grand Caravan	Pretoria-Nyala Lodge	Pilot error, failed go-around
Aaron Enterprises Corporation
Flight designation	Location	Date	Aircraft type	Route	Cause
N400D	Camarones	10 November 1978	Douglas DC-3-178	Unknown	Unknown
AAXICO Airlines
Flight designation	Location	Date	Aircraft type	Route	Cause
N51424	off Pensacola	2 April 1955	Curtiss C-46A	Mobile–Warner Robins	Weather
Flight 7002	Abilene	2 September 1959	Curtiss C-46F	Abilene–Fort Worth	Mechanical failure, stall, loss of control
N67937	San Pedro Sula Airport	18 September 1962	Curtiss C-46F		Engine failure on take-off
Flight 1814	near Great Falls	14 August 1963	Curtiss C-46F	Maelstrom AFB–Ellsworth AFB	Engine failure, pilot error
Flight 11346	Metropolitan Wayne County Airport	20 November 1964	Curtiss C-46F		Wing icing
Flight 1422A	Mount Rainier	23 April 1965	Douglas DC-6A	Seattle–Ogden	CFIT, pilot error
Flight 1416B	Whiteman AFB	10 May 1965	Douglas DC-6A	Oklahoma City–Whiteman	Weather, pilot error
AB Aerotransport
Flight designation	Location	Date	Aircraft type	Route	Cause
SE-AAF; Skane	Emsland	29 August 1929	Junkers G.24li	Unknown	Forced landing after engine trouble
SE-AAG; Norrland	Bulltofta Airport	11 June 1931	Junkers G.24	None	Destroyed in hangar fire
SE-AAE; Svealand	Tubbergen	31 August 1932	Junkers G.24	Amsterdam-Hannover	Engine failure
SE-ABA; Lappland	Bulltofta Airport	9 June 1936	Fokker F.XXII	Stockholm-Malmö-Copenhagen-Amsterdam	Pilot error, triple engine failure on takeoff
SE-BAF; Gladan	North Sea	27 August 1943	Douglas DC-3-268	Aberdeen-Stockholm	Possibly shot down
SE-BAG; Gripen	Hållö Island	22 October 1943	Douglas DC-3-268	Aberdeen-Stockholm	Attacked by German fighter, CFIT
SE-BAM; Tom	Stallarholmen	4 December 1945	Boeing B-17G	Göteborg-Stockholm	Weather
SE-BAY	Bulltofta Airport	9 August 1947	Douglas DC-3F	Amsterdam-Malmö	Runway excursion on landing
Flight 1629; Sunnan	Mount Hymettus	26 October 1947	Douglas DC-4-1009	Istanbul-Athens	CFIT
AB Aviation
Flight designation	Location	Date	Aircraft type	Route	Cause
Flight 1103	near Mohéli	26 February 2022	Cessna 208B Grand Caravan	Moroni-Mohéli	Investigation pending
AB Trafik-Turist-Transportflyg
Flight designation	Location	Date	Aircraft type	Route	Cause
SE-BNG	Santa Maria del Monte	18 November 1947	Bristol 170 Freighter XI	Catania-Roma	CFIT
ABA Aviation Resources Inc.
Flight designation	Location	Date	Aircraft type	Route	Cause
N430MP	Fort Lauderdale-Executive Airport	1 February 2008	Rockwell Sabreliner 40A	None	Impacted by taxiing aircraft
Ababeel Aviation
Flight designation	Location	Date	Aircraft type	Route	Cause
ST-ARO	Geneina Airport	7 June 2004	Antonov An-26B	El Fasher-Geneina	Runway excursion
ST-AQM	El Obeid Airport	28 August 2006	Antonov An-26		Engine failure on take-off
Flight 700	near Khartoum-Civil Airport	30 June 2008	Ilyushin Il-76TD	Khartoum-Juba	Engine failure on take-off, stall
Abakan Airlines
Flight designation	Location	Date	Aircraft type	Route	Cause
Flight 107	near Krasnoyarsk Airport	20 January 1995	Let L-410UVP	Krasnoyarsk-Abakan	Exceeded Maximum takeoff weight, Engine failure on take-off
Abdullah Seikh Ahamed
Flight designation	Location	Date	Aircraft type	Route	Cause
5Y-BIW	Nairobi-Wilson Airport	21 September 1999	Beechcraft 200 Super King Air	Unknown	Unknown
Abeer Air Services
Flight designation	Location	Date	Aircraft type	Route	Cause
YI-BYO	Kolnyang County	27 October 2019	Let L-410UVP	Walgak-Bor	Investigation pending
Abelag Aviation
Flight designation	Location	Date	Aircraft type	Route	Cause
OO-MAS	Berlin	15 February 2013	Embraer EMB-500 Phenom 100	Kortrijk-Berlin	Pilot error, icing, stall
Aboitiz Air
Flight designation	Location	Date	Aircraft type	Route	Cause
RP-C3590	Manila	16 November 2006	NAMC YS-11A-600	Tacloban-Manila	Loss of directional control after touchdown, Right landing gear collapse
Abu Dhabi Army Air Wing
Flight designation	Location	Date	Aircraft type	Route	Cause
302	Unknown	2 July 1970	de Havilland Canada DHC-4A Caribou	Unknown	Unknown
301	Radum	28 October 1976	de Havilland Canada DHC-4A Caribou	Unknown	Unknown
ABX Air
Flight designation	Location	Date	Aircraft type	Route	Cause
Flight 1611	San Francisco International Airport	28 June 2008	Boeing 767-281SF	San Francisco-Wilmington	Fire while standing
Abyssinian Flight Services
Flight designation	Location	Date	Aircraft type	Route	Cause
ET-AMI	near Kombolcha	27 July 2021	Cessna 208B Grand Caravan	Jijiga-Dire Dawa	Forced landing for unknown reasons
ACA-Ancargo Air
Flight designation	Location	Date	Aircraft type	Route	Cause
TN-AFJ	near Cafunfo	27 December 1998	Antonov An-12	Luanda-Lukapa	Unknown, possibly shot down
D2-FDI	near Mona Quimbundo	31 October 2000	Antonov An-26	Saurimo-Luanda	Claimed to be shot down by UNITA
ACE Air Cargo
Flight designation	Location	Date	Aircraft type	Route	Cause
Flight 91	near Saint Mary's	11 February 1999	Beechcraft 1900C-1	Anchorage-Saint Mary's	CFIT
N120AX	near Bethel Airport	16 October 2001	Embraer EMB-120ER Brasilia	Anchorage-Bethel	CFIT
Flight 22	near Sand Point Municipal Airport	21 January 2010	Beechcraft 1900C-1	Sand Point-Anchorage	Loss of control for unknown reasons
Flight 52	near Dillingham Municipal Airport	8 March 2013	Beechcraft 1900C-1	King Salmon-Dillingham	CFIT
ACES - Aerolineas Centrales de Colombia
Flight designation	Location	Date	Aircraft type	Route	Cause
HK-1286	Medellín	29 February 1976	Saunders ST-27	Turbo-Medellín	Hijacking
HK-2216	near San Antero	18 December 1981	de Havilland Canada DHC-6 Twin Otter 300	Medellín-Coveñas	Struck a hill
Flight 189	near Quetame	29 November 1982	de Havilland Canada DHC-6 Twin Otter 310	San José del Guaviare-Bogotá	CFIT
Flight 52	Cerro el Plateado	23 January 1985	de Havilland Canada DHC-6 Twin Otter 300	Quibdó-Medellín	CFIT, weather
HK-2763	El Bagre Airport	27 February 1985	de Havilland Canada DHC-6 Twin Otter 310	None	Set on fire in a riot
HK-2761	near Tame	27 April 1986	de Havilland Canada DHC-6 Twin Otter 300	Bogotá-Saravena	CFIT
HK-2445	in Colombia	1 August 1988	de Havilland Canada DHC-6 Twin Otter 300	El Bagre Airport-Medellín	Hijacking
Flight 385	San José	31 January 1989	Boeing 727-46	San Andréas-Rionegro	Hijacking
HK-2758	Otú Airport	18 February 1991	de Havilland Canada DHC-6 Twin Otter 300	Medellín-Otú	Seized and destroyed by guerrillas after landing
Flight 148	near Medellín	30 November 1996	de Havilland Canada DHC-6 Twin Otter 300	Medellín-Bahía Solano	Stall, pilot error, exceeded Maximum takeoff weight
VP-BOF	Bogotá	11 October 2000	ATR 42-512	Unknown	Collision on the ground
VP-BVE	near Cartagena	12 January 2002	ATR 42-512	Cartagena-Bucaramanga	Engine failure
ACM Praha
Flight designation	Location	Date	Aircraft type	Route	Cause
OK-NYA	Bad Kirchheim	9 July 1994	Antonov An-2	Unknown	Crashed on landing
Acme Leasing / K. Knight
Flight designation	Location	Date	Aircraft type	Route	Cause
N39393	Pivijay	21 July 1972	Douglas C-53	Panama City-Aruba	Runway excursion
Acme Plywood & Veneer Company
Flight designation	Location	Date	Aircraft type	Route	Cause
RP-C2152	near Luzon	7 October 1978	Britten-Norman BN-2 Islander		CFIT, weather
ACS Ltd.
Flight designation	Location	Date	Aircraft type	Route	Cause
9XR-AL	Lankein	14 September 2003	Let L-410UVP	Lankein-Lokichoggio	Runway excursion due to aborted takeoff
ACSA - Air Century
Flight designation	Location	Date	Aircraft type	Route	Cause
HI816	Punta Cana International Airport	12 October 2014	British Aerospace 3101 Jetstream 31	San Juan-Punta Cana	Runway excursion, pilot error, oil leak
ACT Airlines
Flight designation	Location	Date	Aircraft type	Route	Cause
Flight 521	Bagram Air Base	1 March 2010	Airbus A300B4-203F	Bahrain-Bagram	Landing gear collapse
AD Aviation Aircharters
Flight designation	Location	Date	Aircraft type	Route	Cause
5Y-JKB	near Nairobi	6 November 1998	Beechcraft 200 Super King Air	Nairobi–K-50 Airport	Crashed for unknown reasons
Adam Air
Flight designation	Location	Date	Aircraft type	Route	Cause
Flight 574	53 mi off Pambauang	1 January 2007	Boeing 737-4Q8	Surabaya–Manado	IRS malfunction, pilot error, spatial disorientation, loss of control
Flight 172	Juanda Airport	21 February 2007	Boeing 737-33A	Jakarta–Surabaya	Pilot error, excessive sink rate, structural failure
Flight 292	Hang Nadim Airport	10 March 2008	Boeing 737-408	Jakarta–Batam	Runway excursion
Adastra Aerial Surveys
Flight designation	Location	Date	Aircraft type	Route	Cause
VH-AGE	near Tennant Creek Airport	24 September 1966	Lockheed 414-08 Hudson IVA	None	Loss of control for unknown reasons
Adastra Airways
Flight designation	Location	Date	Aircraft type	Route	Cause
VH-AGO	near Horn Island Airport	24 June 1957	Lockheed 414-56 Hudson IIIA	None	Engine failure, pilot error
VH-AGG	near Lae Airfield	8 June 1958	Lockheed 414-56 Hudson IIIA	None	Loss of reason for unknown reasons
VH-AGX	Horn Island Airport	22 December 1973	Lockheed 414-08-10 Hudson IV		Engine failure leading to runway excursion
ADC Airlines
Flight designation	Location	Date	Aircraft type	Route	Cause
Flight 018	Sprigg Payne Airport	18 August 1994	Douglas DC-9-31	Banjul–Freetown–Monrovia	Runway overrun
5N-BBA	Sprigg Payne Airport	26 July 1995	Douglas DC-9-31	Lagos–Accra–Monrovia	Pilot error, crashed short of runway
Flight 86	near Ejirin, Nigeria	7 November 1996	Boeing 727-231	Port Harcourt–Lagos	ATC error and pilot error: loss of control after collision evasion
5N-BAA	Calabar Airport	29 July 1997	BAC 1-11-203AE	Lagos–Calabar	Pilot error, runway overrun
Flight 53	Abuja International Airport	29 October 2006	Boeing 737-2B7	Lagos-Abuja–Sokoto	Weather, windshear, pilot error, stall, loss of control
Aden Airways
Flight designation	Location	Date	Aircraft type	Route	Cause
VR-AAM	Hargeisa	12 April 1964	Douglas C-47B-20-DK	Unknown	Unknown
VR-AAA	Hadibo	26 March 1965	Douglas C-47B-1-DK	Riyan Airport-Hadibo	Runway excursion
VR-AAN	Wadi Rabtah	22 November 1966	Douglas R4D-1	Mayfa'ah-Aden	Bombing
VR-AAV	Aden International Airport	30 June 1967	Vickers 760D Viscount	None	Bombing
ADES Colombia - Aerolineas del Este
Flight designation	Location	Date	Aircraft type	Route	Cause
HK-3177	near Villavicencio	15 May 1991	Douglas C-47B	Villavicencio-Miraflores	Engine failure
Adhemar de Barros
Flight designation	Location	Date	Aircraft type	Route	Cause
PT-AXX	near Picinguaba Cove	5 July 1953	Consolidated PBY-5A Catalina		Failed go-around
Adikarto Printindo
Flight designation	Location	Date	Aircraft type	Route	Cause
PK-VRA	Palembang Airport	12 January 1991	Dornier Do 28D-1 Skyservant		Runway excursion
Adlair
Flight designation	Location	Date	Aircraft type	Route	Cause
C-GFYN	near Pelly Bay	23 July 1998	de Havilland Canada DHC-6 Twin Otter 200		Weather
Adria Airways
Flight designation	Location	Date	Aircraft type	Route	Cause
YU-AOE	Ljubljana	28 June 1991	Airbus A320-231	None	Attacked by the Yugoslav Air Force in the Ten-Day War
Advance Airlines
Flight designation	Location	Date	Aircraft type	Route	Cause
VH-AAV	Sydney	21 February 1980	Beechcraft 200 Super King Air	Sydney-Temora	Impacted sea wall for unknown reasons
Advance Aviation Inc
Flight designation	Location	Date	Aircraft type	Route	Cause
N244B	near Farmerville	6 September 1978	Douglas DC-7CF	Curaçao-Almyra	CFIT
Advanced Aviation
Flight designation	Location	Date	Aircraft type	Route	Cause
D-CAAW	Bangui Airport	16 August 2008	Dornier 228-202K	None	Hit a truck while towed
Advanced Power Aviation LLC
Flight designation	Location	Date	Aircraft type	Route	Cause
N888JL	Wichita-Mid-Continent Airport	October 2016	Cessna 500 Citation I	None	Ripped apart when towed with brakes locked
Adventure Air
Flight designation	Location	Date	Aircraft type	Route	Cause
C-GSUV	Lac du Bonnet	16 May 2008	de Havilland Canada DHC-3T/M601 Turbine Otter		Weather
Adventure Aviation
Flight designation	Location	Date	Aircraft type	Route	Cause
N203E	Sullivan Regional Airport	29 July 2006	de Havilland Canada DHC-6 Twin Otter 100	None	Engine failure, pilot error
Adygeya-Avia
Flight designation	Location	Date	Aircraft type	Route	Cause
RA-17832	Stanitsa Nekrasovskaya	25 April 2001	Antonov An-2R	Unknown	CFIT
AECA - Aeroservicios Ecuatorianos
Flight designation	Location	Date	Aircraft type	Route	Cause
NC54335	Guayaquil	6 February 1949	Douglas C-47A-90-DL	Unknown	Crashed into river bank for unknown reasons
Aer Arann
Flight designation	Location	Date	Aircraft type	Route	Cause
EI-BBA	Inishmore Airport	17 October 1975	Britten-Norman BN-2A-26 Islander	Unknown	Crashed
EI-BBR	Galway-Carnmore Airport	7 July 1980	Britten-Norman BN-2A-26 Islander	Unknown	Aborted takeoff, runway excursion with impact with wall
EI-SLM	Shannon Airport	17 July 2011	ATR 72-212	Manchester–Shannon	Weather, pilot error leading to nose gear collapse
EI-BYO	Shannon Airport	12 February 2014	ATR 42-300	None	Damaged in storm
Aer Lingus
Flight designation	Location	Date	Aircraft type	Route	Cause
EI-ACA	near Shannon	18 June 1946	Douglas DC-3-268B	Unknown	Engine fire, forced landing
EI-AFL; Saint Kevin	Cwm Edno, Wales	10 January 1952	Douglas C-47B Dakota III	London–Dublin	Weather, turbulence, CFIT
EI-ACF; St. Kieran	Spernall	1 January 1953	Douglas DC-3D	Dublin–Birmingham	Fuel starvation, double engine failure, forced landing
EI-AOF; St. Cathal	near Ashbourne	22 June 1967	Vickers Viscount 803	None	Stall, loss of control for reasons unknown
EI-AKK; St. Aidan	Bristol Airport	21 September 1967	Vickers Viscount 808	Dublin–Bristol	Pilot error, belly landing
Flight 712; St. Phelim	off Tuskar Rock	24 March 1968	Vickers Viscount 803	Cork–London	Undetermined (structural failure, possible shootdown)
Flight 164	Le Touquet Airport	2 May 1981	Boeing 737-248C	Dublin-London	Hijacking
Flight 156	Dublin Airport	7 December 1985	Boeing 737-248	Dublin–London	Bird strike
Flight 328	near East Midlands Airport	31 January 1986	Shorts 360-100	Dublin–East Midlands	Icing, loss of control
Flight 713	Heathrow Airport	23 March 2004	Airbus A321-211	London-Dublin	Hit by towed aircraft
Flight 132	Logan Int'l Airport	9 June 2005	Airbus A330	Boston–Shannon	ATC error
AerianTur-M
Flight designation	Location	Date	Aircraft type	Route	Cause
ER-26068	near Balad Air Base	9 January 2007	Antonov An-26B-100	Adana–Balad	Disputed
Aeroflot Russian Airlines
Flight designation	Location	Date	Aircraft Type	Route	Cause
СССР-Л104	Unknown	26 May 1931	ANT-9	Unknown	Unknown
Unknown	Tambov	27 January 1932	U-2	Unknown	Disputed
СССР-Л718	Tambov	23 February 1932	PS-5	Nizhne-Tambov	Overloaded
СССР-Л128	Moscow	10 May 1932	ANT-9	Moscow-Moscow	Oil leak on the right engine
CCCP-Z1	Kulebyakino	27 October 1932	SM.62bis	Irkutsk-Bodaibo	Weather
Unknown	Yekatinburg	27 January 1933	ANT-9	Unknown	Unknown
Aerolíneas Argentinas
Aeroméxico
Flight designation	Location	Date	Aircraft type	Route	Cause
Flight 229	near Puerto Vallarta	20 June 1973	Douglas DC-9-15	Houston–Monterrey–Puerto Vallarta–Mexico City	CFIT
Flight 152	Léon	2 September 1976	Douglas DC-9-15	Mexico City–Léon	Runway overrun
Flight 230	Villalobos	27 July 1981	Douglas DC-9-32	Monterrey–Chihuahua	Runway overrun, and fire
Flight 110	Zihuatanejo	8 November 1981	Douglas DC-9-32	Acapulco–Guadalajara	CFIT
Flight 498	Cerritos, California	31 August 1986	Douglas DC-9-32	Tijuana–Los Angeles	Mid-air collision
Unknown	Mexico City	15 October 1997	Douglas DC-9-32	?-Mexico City	Fuselage struck runway
Flight 250	Reynose–Gen Lucio Blanco	6 October 2000	Douglas DC-9-31	Mexico City–Reynosa	Runway overrun
Flight 254	Escobedo	31 October 2002	Douglas DC-9-32	Guadalajara–Monterrey	Runway overrun
Flight 576	Cancún	9 September 2009	Boeing 737	Cancun–Mexico City	Hijacking
Flight 002	Madrid	16 April 2013	Boeing 767	Madrid–Mexico City	Tailstrike
Aeroperú
Flight designation	Location	Date	Aircraft type	Route	Cause
Flight 603	Peru	2 October 1996	Boeing 757-200	Lima–Santiago	Instrumentation failure
Aerosvit Ukrainian Airlines
Flight designation	Location	Date	Aircraft type	Route	Cause
Flight 241	Thessaloniki	17 December 1997	Yakovlev Yak-42	Odessa–Mikra	Pilot error
Flight 406	Sheremetyevo Airport	27 April 2004	Boeing 737-529	Moscow–Kyiv	Loss of engine power, aborted takeoff, runway overrun
Afriqiyah Airways
Flight designation	Location	Date	Aircraft type	Route	Cause
Flight 771	near Tripoli International Airport	12 May 2010	Airbus A330-200	Johannesburg–Tripoli	Spatial disorientation, poor CRM, pilot error
5A-IAY	Tripoli International Airport	25 August 2011	Airbus A300B4-620	None	Destroyed on the ground
5A-ONK	Tripoli International Airport	25 August 2011	Airbus A320-214	None	Damaged by shelling
5A-ONF	Tripoli International Airport	20 July 2014	Airbus A330-202	None	Struck by RPG, burned out
Flight 209	Malta International Airport	23 December 2016	Airbus A320-214	Sabha–Tripoli	Hijacking
Air Algérie
Flight designation	Location	Date	Aircraft type	Route	Cause
F-BCYO	Bron Airport	8 January 1949	Douglas C-47A	Algiers–Lyon	Gear collapse on landing
F-OAIY	Orly Airport	30 October 1951	SNCASO SO.30P-1 Bretagne	Paris–Algiers	Retraction of landing gear for reasons unknown
F-BAZG	Maison Blanche Airport	17 December 1955	Lockheed L-749A Constellation	Algiers–Paris	Fire during takeoff for reasons unknown
F-OBNI	near Orly Airport	19 May 1960	Sud Aviation Caravelle IA	Algiers–Paris	Mid-air collision with a Stampe SV-4
F-BAZE	Maison Blanche Airport	26 April 1962	Lockheed L-749A Constellation	None	Terrorism, blown up
7T-VAU	near Tamanrasset Airport	11 April 1967	Douglas DC-4	Algiers–Tamanrasset	CFIT
7T-VAK	near Messaoud Airport	26 July 1969	Sud Aviation Caravelle VIN	Marseille–Biskra	Short circuit, smoke in cockpit, loss of control
7T-VAI	Dar el Beida Airport	23 September 1973	Sud Aviation Caravelle III		Crashed on landing
7T-VSU	near Leger Airport	24 January 1979	Nord 262A-44		Disregard of procedure, poor CRM, altimeter failure, crew fatigue, crashed short of runway
7T-VHK	Aguemar Airport	1 August 1989	Lockheed L-100-30 Hercules	Algiers–Tamanrasset	Heavy landing, ground looped
7T-VRM	In Guezzam Airport	25 July 1991	Fokker F27-400M	Tamanrasset–In Guezzam	Bounced and landed hard, nosegear collapsed
Flight 702P; Oasis	near Baginton Airport	21 December 1994	Boeing 737-2D6C	Algiers–Amsterdam–Coventry	CFIT
7T-VED	Tlemcen Airport	2 August 1996	Boeing 737-2D6C	Tlemcen–Algiers	Runway overrun, nosegear collapse
7T-VEH	Ain el Bey Airport	31 January 1999	Boeing 727-2D6	Paris–Constantine	Runway overrun, nosegear collapse
Flight 6289; Monts du Daia	Tamanhasset Airport	6 March 2003	Boeing 737-200	Tamanrasset–Noumerate	EFTO, loss of control
7T-VJQ	Sevilla Airport	18 March 2006	Boeing 737-6D6	Oran–Seville	Weather, landing gear collapse
Flight 2208	near Piacenza	13 August 2006	Lockheed L-100-30 Hercules	Algiers–Frankfurt	Autopilot problems, loss of control
Flight 1143	Ain Arat Airport	14 March 2008	Boeing 737-8D6	Paris–Sétif	Heavy landing
Flight 5017	50 mi northwest of Gossi, Mali	24 July 2014	McDonnell Douglas MD-83	Ouagadougou–Algiers	Loss of control caused by engine icing
AirAsia
Flight designation	Location	Date	Aircraft type	Route	Cause
Flight 104	Kota Kinabalu	7 November 2004	Boeing 737		Runway overrun
Flight 5218	Kuching Airport	10 January 2011	Airbus A320-200	Kuala Lumpur-Kuching	Runway overrun
Flight 1580	Medan	26 September 2017	Airbus A320	Medan-Penang	Possible bird strike, engine problems
AirAsia X
Flight designation	Location	Date	Aircraft type	Route	Cause
Flight 237	Perth	25 June 2017	Airbus A330	Perth-Kuala Lumpur	Contained engine failure
Flight 207	Gold Coast	3 July 2017	Airbus A330	Gold Coast-Kuala Lumpur	Bird strike, engine fire
Airblue
Flight designation	Location	Date	Aircraft type	Route	Cause
Unknown	Quetta	4 May 2008	Airbus A320 family	?–Quetta	Tailstrike on landing
Flight 202	Margalla Hills, Pakistan	28 July 2010	Airbus A321	Karachi–Islamabad	Violation of procedure, poor CRM
Air Canada incl. TCA
Flight designation	Location	Date	Aircraft type	Route	Cause
CF-TCL	Regina Airport	18 November 1938	Lockheed 14-H2 Super Electra	Regina–Vancouver	Crashed shortly after takeoff
TCA Flight 3	near Armstrong Airport	6 February 1941	Lockheed 14-H2 Super Electra	Montreal-Ottawa-Toronto-North Bay-Winnipeg	Engine problems, crashed into trees
CF-TCJ	Moncton	2 September 1946	Lockheed 14-08 Super Electra	None	Engine failure
CF-TCQ	near Headingley	23 January 1947	Lockheed 14-H2 Super Electra		CFIT
TCA Flight 3	10 mi north of Vancouver	28 April 1947	Lockheed 18-08A Lodestar	Lethbridge–Vancouver	Unexplained disappearance
CF-TEL	Sydney Airport	12 August 1948	Canadair DC-4M1 North Star	Montreal–Sydney–Prestwick	CFIT, crashed short of runway
TCA Flight 9	Moose Jaw, Saskatchewan	8 April 1954	Canadair C-4-1 Argonaut	Winnipeg–Vancouver	Mid-air collision with RCAF Harvard
CF-TGG	Brampton	17 December 1954	Lockheed L-1049E Super Constellation	Tampa–Toronto	Pilot negligence
TCA Flight 304	over Flat Rock, Michigan	9 July 1956	Vickers Viscount 724	Chicago–Toronto-Montreal	Mechanical failure, propeller separation
TCA Flight 810-9	Chilliwack, British Columbia	9 December 1956	Canadair DC-4M2 North Star	Vancouver–Mud Bay–Abbotsford–Cultus Lake–Calgary	Possible engine fire, weather, CFIT
CF-TGL	Idlewild International Airport	10 November 1958	Vickers Viscount 724	New York-Montreal	Struck by Seaboard & Western Airlines Super Constellation
CF-TGY	near Toronto	3 October 1959	Vickers Viscount 757		Pilot error, crashed short of runway
TCA Flight 455	RCAF Bagotville	10 October 1962	Vickers Viscount 757	Sept Îles–Bagotville	Runway collision with a RCAF CF-101B
TCA Flight 861	London Heathrow Airport	6 November 1963	Douglas DC-8-54F	London–Montreal	Pilot error, aborted takeoff, runway overrun
TCA Flight 831	Sainte-Thérèse, Quebec	29 November 1963	Douglas DC-8-54F	Montreal–Toronto	Unknown (mechanical failure or pitot icing)
Flight 3277	Toronto International Airport	13 June 1964	Vickers Viscount 757	Montreal–Toronto	Pilot error, loss of control
CF-TJM	Ottawa	19 May 1967	Douglas DC-8-54F	Montreal–Ottawa	Loss of control
CF-THK	Sept–Îles Airport	7 April 1969	Vickers Viscount 757		In-flight fire
Flight 106	Vancouver	1 March 1970	Vickers Viscount 757		Mid-air collision with an Ercoupe 415
Flight 621	Toronto	5 July 1970	Douglas DC-8-63	Montreal–Toronto–Los Angeles	Crew error
Flight 890	Toronto	21 June 1973	Douglas DC-8-53	Toronto–Zürich	Caught fire during refueling, burned out
Flight 445	near Jose Marti International Airport	18 March 1976	Douglas DC-8-43	Montreal–Havana	Mid-air collision with a Cubana Antonov An-24
Flight 189	Pearson International Airport	26 June 1978	Douglas DC-9-32	Toronto–Winnipeg	Mechanical failure, pilot error
C-FTLY	Montreal	2 June 1982	Douglas DC-9-32	None	Maintenance error, fuel tank explosion (while parked)
Flight 797	Cincinnati	2 June 1983	Douglas DC-9-32	Dallas–Toronto–Montreal	In-flight fire
Flight 143	Gimli, Manitoba	23 July 1983	Boeing 767-200	Montreal–Ottawa–Edmonton	Maintenance error, crew error, fuel starvation
Flight 646	Fredericton Airport	16 December 1997	Bombardier CRJ-100ER	Toronto–Fredericton	Wing icing, stall, loss of control
Flight 116	Pearson International Airport	13 May 2002	Boeing 767-3Y0ER	Vancouver–Toronto	In-flight fire
Flight 723	LaGuardia Airport	8 September 2006	Airbus A319-112	New York–Toronto	Struck by a Shuttle America Embraer ERJ-170
Flight 624	Stanfield International Airport	29 March 2015	Airbus A320-211	Toronto–Halifax	Under investigation (struck obstacles while landing)
Flight 759	San Francisco International Airport	7 July 2017	Airbus A320-211	Toronto-San Francisco	Near collision during approach
Air Caraïbes
Flight designation	Location	Date	Aircraft type	Route	Cause
Flight 1501	Saint-Barthélémy	24 March 2001	de Havilland Canada DHC-6-300	Sint Maarten-Juliana–Saint Barthélémy	Pilot error
Air China
Flight designation	Location	Date	Aircraft type	Route	Cause
B-2208	Guilin Airport	22 March 1990	Hawker-Siddeley Trident 2E	Shanghai–Guilin	Runway overrun on landing
Flight 973	Chiang Kai Shek Airport	10 August 1993	Boeing 767-2J6ER	Beijing–Xiamen–Jakarta	Hijacking
Flight 129	Busan	15 April 2002	Boeing 767-200ER	Beijing–Busan	Poor CRM, crew errors, CFIT
Flight 1250	Xinxhang International Airport	15 April 2018	Airbus A321-213	Changsha–Beijing	Attempted hijacking
Flight 183	Beijing-Capital International Airport	27 August 2019	Airbus A330-343	Beijing–Tokyo	Burned while parked
Air Florida
Flight designation	Location	Date	Aircraft type	Route	Cause
Flight 90	Washington, D.C.	13 January 1982	Boeing 737-200	Tampa–Fort Lauderdale	Pilot error, wing icing
Air France
Air India
Flight designation	Location	Date	Aircraft type	Route	Cause
VT-ATI	Jammu Airport	13 November 1947	Douglas C-53		Runway overrun
VT-AUG	Korangi Creek	27 December 1947	Douglas C-48C	Karachi–Bombay	Loss of control
VT-CLY	Santacruz Airport	6 February 1948	Vickers Viking 1B	Calcutta–Bombay	Engine failure
VT-CIZ	Marve Beach	7 April 1949	Vickers Viking 1B	Bombay–Karachi	Belly landing
Flight 245; Malabar Princess	Mont Blanc	3 November 1950	Lockheed L-749A Constellation	Bombay–London	Weather, CFIT
VT-CFK	Katagiri	13 December 1950	Douglas C-47B	Bombay–Coimbatore	Navigation error, CFIT
VT-CCA	Hindustan Airport	15 September 1951	Douglas C-47A	Bangalore–Trivandrum	Loss of control
VT-AUD	Palam Airport	9 May 1953	Douglas C-47A	Delhi–Ahmedabad	Crew error, loss of control
Flight 300; Kashmir Princess	Natuna Islands	11 April 1955	Lockheed L-749A Constellation	Bombay–Hong Kong–Jakarta	Bombing
VT-DIN; Rani of Aera	Mumbai	19 July 1959	Lockheed L-1049G Super Constellation	Tokyo–Hong Kong–Calcutta–Bombay	Improperly set altimeter
VT-DJK	Schwechat International Airport	12 November 1963	Boeing 707-437		Struck radar mast on approach
Flight 101; Kanchenjunga	Mont Blanc	24 January 1966	Boeing 707-437	Mumbai-Delhi–Beirut–Geneva-London	Pilot error
VT-DJI; Nandi Devi	Mumbai	23 January 1971	Boeing 707-437	None	Pilot error, loss of control, ran off runway
Flight 855; Emperor Ashoka	off Santacruz Airport	1 January 1978	Boeing 747-237B	Bombay–Dubai	Instrument malfunction
Flight 224	Durban Airport	26 November 1981	Boeing 707-337C	Seychelles–Bombay	Hijacking
Flight 403; Gouri Shankar	Santacruz Airport	21 June 1982	Boeing 707-437	Kuala Lumpur–Bombay	Pilot error
Flight 182; Emperor Kanishka	Atlantic Ocean	23 June 1985	Boeing 747-200B	Montreal–London–Delhi–Bombay	Terrorist bombing
N816EV	Dum Dum Airport	4 July 1985	Douglas DC-8-73CF	Hong Kong–Calcutta	Landing gear failure
Flight 132; Emperor Vikramaditya	Indira Gandhi International Airport	7 May 1990	Boeing 747-237B	London–Delhi	Engine separation, in-flight fire
Flight 829	Chhatrapati Shivaji International Airport	4 September 2009	Boeing 747-437	Mumbai–Riyadh	Fuel leak, engine fire
VT-ALH	Mumbai Airport	28 May 2012	Boeing 777-237LR		Unexplained nose damage
Flight 890	Jaipur International Airport	5 January 2014	Airbus A320-231	Guwahati–Delhi	Landed next to runway, struck trees
Flight 171	Ahmedabad	12 June 2025	Boeing 787-8 Dreamliner	Ahmedabad—London	Under investigation (crash on takeoff)
Air India Express
Flight designation	Location	Date	Aircraft type	Route	Cause
Flight 812	Mangalore International Airport	22 May 2010	Boeing 737-8HG	Dubai–Mangalore	Pilot fatigue, pilot error, runway overrun
Flight 611	Tiruchirappalli International Airport	11 October 2018	Boeing 737-8HG	Tamil Nadu–Dubai	Tailstrike, pilot error
Flight 1344	Calicut International Airport	7 August 2020	Boeing 737-8HG	Dubai–Kozhikode	Weather, pilot error, runway overrun
Air Inter
Flight designation	Location	Date	Aircraft type	Route	Cause
Flight 2611	Lyon	12 August 1963	Vickers Viscount 708	Lille–Lyon–Nice	Weather, CFIT
F-BNKI	Orly Airport	4 January 1971	Sud Aviation Caravelle III	None	Burned on the ground (while parked)
F-BOEA	Aulnat Airport	28 December 1971	Vickers Viscount 708	None	Loss of control
Flight 696	near Noirétable	27 October 1972	Vickers Viscount 724	Lyon–Clermont	Weather, CFIT
F-BSRY	Poretta Airport	22 March 1974	Sud Aviation Caravelle III	Bastia–Marseille	Sabotage, blown up on the ground (while parked)
F-BPNF	Quimper Airport	5 August 1974	Fokker F27-500	None	Terrorist bombing
F-GHQB	Lesquin Airport	5 December 1989	Airbus A320-211	Paris–Lille	Runway incursion (struck a Mooney M20)
Flight 148	near Strasbourg	20 January 1992	Airbus A320-111	Lyon–Strasbourg	Pilot error, CFIT
Flight 84	Frejorgues Airport	24 April 1993	Airbus A300B2-1C	Montpellier–Paris	Struck light pole (during pushback)
Air Koryo
Flight designation	Location	Date	Aircraft type	Route	Cause
P-551	Pyongyang Sunan International Airport	15 August 2006	Tupolev Tu-154B	Beijing–Pyongyang	Runway overrun
Unknown	Sunan International Airport	15 August 2006	Ilyushin Il-62M	Beijing–Pyongyang	Hard landing
P-633	Vladivostok International Airport	1 March 2013	Tupolev Tu-204-100B	Pyongyang–Vladivostok	Runway overrun
Airlines of Australia
Flight designation	Location	Date	Aircraft type	Route	Cause
VH-UHH	Lamington National Park	19 February 1937	Stinson Model A	Archerfield–Lismore–Sydney	CFIT
VH-UGG	Brisbane	28 March 1937	Stinson Model A	Brisbane–Townsville	CFIT
VH-UQL	Coen, Queensland	27 August 1941	de Havilland Puss Moth	Horn Island–Coen–Cairns	Wing separation
Airlink
Flight designation	Location	Date	Aircraft type	Route	Cause
P2-ALF	Lakunai Airfield	19 September 1994	Britten-Norman BN-2A-26 Islander	None	Covered in volcanic ash
P2-ALH	Near Kimbe	3 February 1999	Britten-Norman BN-2A-20 Islander	Kimbe-Kandrian	Weather, in-flight breakup, loss of control
P2-ALX	near Goroka	17 June 1999	Embraer EMB-110P2	Lae–Goroka	CFIT
Flight 304	near Kandrian	30 March 2007	Embraer EMB-110P1	Port Moresby-Kimbe-Rabaul	Engine failure, CFIT for reasons unknown
Air Manila
Flight designation	Location	Date	Aircraft type	Route	Cause
Flight 702	NAS Agana	4 June 1976	Lockheed L-188A Electra	NAS Agana–Manila	Engine failure, pilot error
Air Midwest
Flight designation	Location	Date	Aircraft type	Route	Cause
Flight 5481	Charlotte, North Carolina	8 January 2003	Beechcraft 1900D	Charlotte–Greer	Maintenance error
Air New Zealand
Flight designation	Location	Date	Aircraft type	Route	Cause
ZK-NZB	Auckland International Airport	4 July 1966	Douglas DC-8-52	None	Loss of control
Flight 4374	off Auckland	17 February 1979	Fokker F27-500	Gisborne–Auckland	Weather, optical illusion, CFIT
Flight 901	Mount Erebus, Antarctica	28 November 1979	McDonnell Douglas DC-10-30	Auckland–Harewood	Pilot error, CFIT
Flight 24	Nadi International Airport	19 May 1987	Boeing 747-200	Tokyo-Nadi-Auckland	Hijacking
ZK-NBC	Nadi International Airport	9 March 1991	Boeing 767-219ER	Honolulu–Nadi	Turbulence, runway overrun
ZK-NBC	near Brisbane	8 December 2002	Boeing 767-219ER	Brisbane–Auckland	Uncontained engine failure
Flight 2279	near Woodbourne Airport	8 February 2008	British Aerospace Jetstream	Blenheim–Christchurch	Hijacking
Flight 888T	off Plage	27 November 2008	Airbus A320-232	None	Maintenance error, loss of control
Air Nippon
Flight designation	Location	Date	Aircraft type	Route	Cause
Flight 354	Okadama Airport	16 February 2000	NAMC YS-11A-213	Hakodate–Sapporo	Weather, runway overrun
Air Ontario
Flight designation	Location	Date	Aircraft type	Route	Cause
Flight 937	Pikangikum Lake	1 November 1988	Douglas C-47A	Red Lake–Pikangikum	Stall, loss of control
Flight 1363	Dryden Municipal Airport	10 March 1989	Fokker F28-1000	Thunder Bay-Dryden–Winnipeg	Wing icing, loss of control
Air Orient
Flight designation	Location	Date	Aircraft type	Route	Cause
PH-AEO	Sandoway, Burma	7 June 1931	Fokker F.VIIB	Saigon–Karachi	Weather
F-ALCE	Mount Terrione, Italy	23 April 1933	CAMS 33	Naples–Athens	CFIT
Air Philippines
Flight designation	Location	Date	Aircraft type	Route	Cause
RP-C1981	Naga Airport	24 June 1996	NAMC YS-11-109		Landing gear failure
Flight 541	Davao	19 April 2000	Boeing 737-2H4	Manila–Davao City	ATC error
Air Rhodesia
Flight designation	Location	Date	Aircraft type	Route	Cause
Flight 825; Hunyani	Whamira Hills, Zimbabwe	3 September 1978	Vickers Viscount 782D	Kariba–Salisbury	Shot down
Flight 827; Umniati	near Kariba, Rhodesia (Zimbabwe)	12 February 1979	Vickers Viscount 748D	Kariba–Salisbury	Shot down
Air Saint Martin
Flight designation	Location	Date	Aircraft type	Route	Cause
F-OHRK	near Port-au-Prince	7 December 1995	Beechcraft 1900D	Pointe-a-Pitre–Port–au–Prince	CFIT
Air Tahoma
Flight designation	Location	Date	Aircraft type	Route	Cause
Flight 185	Covington, Kentucky	13 August 2004	Convair 580	Memphis–Covington	Fuel exhaustion, double engine failure
N587X	Rickenbacker International Airport	1 September 2008	Convair 580	Columbus–Mansfield	Maintenance error, loss of control
Air Transat
Flight designation	Location	Date	Aircraft type	Route	Cause
Flight 906	49 mi northeast of Lyon	6 July 2001	Lockheed L-1011 TriStar	Lyon–Berlin	Damaged in hailstorm
Flight 236	Lajes Airport	24 August 2001	Airbus A330-200	Toronto–Lisbon	Improper maintenance, fuel exhaustion
Flight 961	Juan Gualberto Gomez Airport	6 March 2005	Airbus A310-300	Varadero–Quebec	Structural failure of rudder
Air Union
Flight designation	Location	Date	Aircraft type	Route	Cause
F-AEGP; Flandre	Lympne Airport	7 May 1923	Farman F.60 Goliath		Forced landing
F-AEBY	Monsures, France	14 May 1923	Farman F.60 Goliath	Paris–Croydon	Wing separation, loss of control
F-AEDL	near Étaples	25 June 1923	Farman F.61 Goliath		Forced landing on beach & was destroyed
F-AECB	East Malling, United Kingdom	27 August 1923	Farman F.60 Goliath	Paris-Croydon	Engine failure, centre of gravity affected by passengers misunderstanding instruction
F-AEIF	Littlestone	3 December 1923	Farman F.60 Goliath		
F-GEAO	Croydon Airport	22 January 1924	Farman F.60 Goliath	Paris–Croydon	Heavy landing
F-ADDT; Languedoc	Golden Green	6 August 1924	Farman F.63 Goliath	Paris-Croydon	Engine failure
Unknown	Lympne	8 February 1925	Farman F.60 Goliath	Paris-Croydon	Engine failure
F-HMFU; Île de France	Wadhurst	16 October 1925	Farman F.60 Goliath	Paris–Croydon	Low visibility, CFIT
F-FHMY; Picardie	English Channel off Boulogne-sur-Mer	14 November 1925	Farman F.60 Goliath		Water ditching
F-AIEB; Wilbur Wright	Aldington, Kent	18 August 1926	Blériot 155	Paris–Croydon	Engine failure, crash during forced landing
F-AICQ; Clément Ader	Leigh, Kent	2 October 1926	Blériot 155	Paris–Croydon	In-flight fire
F-AEGP; Flandre	Tonbridge, Kent	10 March 1927	Farman F.60 Goliath		Engine failure
F-GEAB; Savoie	Wrotham, Kent	24 November 1927	Farman F.60 Goliath		Forced landing
F-AECU; Normandie	off Hythe, Kent	6 March 1928	Farman F.60 Goliath	Paris–Croydon	Mechanical failure, ditched at sea
F-AEFC; Provence	English Channel off Folkestone	11 March 1928	Farman F.61 Goliath	Paris–Croydon	Crashed at sea
F-GEAI; Vendée	Paddock Wood railway station	19 May 1929	Farman F.63bis Goliath	Croydon–Paris	Forced landing for reasons unknown
F-GEAB; Savoie	Smarden, Kent	31 July 1929	Farman F.60 Goliath	London-Paris	Forced landing
F-AIGB	Mediterranean Sea off Corsica	15 November 1929	Lioré et Olivier 190	Marseille-Ajaccio-Tunis	Poor visibility
F-FHMY; Picardie	Marden, Kent	10 February 1930	Farman F.63bis Goliath	Paris–Croydon	Structural failure of tailplane
F-ADCA; Lorraine	Penshurst, Kent	1 May 1930	Farman F.63 Goliath	Paris–Croydon	Weather
F-AIZO	Snave, Kent	25 July 1930	Lioré et Olivier LeO 213		Engine failure
F-AIVU	near Lympne	17 January 1931	Breguet 280T		Crashed on landing
F-ADDT; Languedoc	near Marden	23 April 1931	Farman F.60 Goliath	Marden–Paris	Crashed on takeoff
Air Vietnam
Flight designation	Location	Date	Aircraft type	Route	Cause
F-VNAI	Pakse	16 August 1954	Bristol 170 Freighter 21E	Hanoi–Saigon	Engine failure, CFIT
XV-NID	near Da Nang	10 November 1962	Douglas C-47B	Hue–Da Nang	Weather, navigation error, CFIT
XV-NIC	near Quang Ngai	16 September 1965	Douglas C-47A	Quang Ngai-Saigon	Shot down
XV-NUC	Hue-Citadel Airfield	2 April 1969	Douglas DC-6B	None	Destroyed on the ground
F-BELL	Saigon Airport	1 May 1969	Douglas C-54B	None	Burned while parked
XV-NUG	near Da Nang Airport	20 September 1969	Douglas C-54D	Pleiku–Da Nang	Pilot error, mid-air collision with a USAF F-4
B-2005	Nha Trang Airport	22 December 1969	Douglas DC-6B	Saigon–Nha Trang	Bombing, runway overrun
B-305	Hai Van Mountains, near Da Nang	30 September 1970	Douglas DC-3DST-318A	Buon Ma Thuot–Hue	CFIT
B-1543 (leased from China Airlines)	Quy Nhơn	1 November 1970	Curtiss C-46D	Saigon–Quang Ngai	Possible fuel exhaustion, forced landing
XV-HUI	near Bến Cát	24 September 1972	Douglas C-54D	Vientiane-Saigon	CFIT
XV-NUI	near Buon Ma Thuot Airport	19 March 1973	Douglas C-54D	Saigon–Buon Ma Thuot	In-flight explosion for reasons unknown, explosive decompression, in-flight breakup
XV-NJC	near Bangkok	5 September 1973	Boeing 727-121C	Bangkok–Saigon	In-flight explosion
XV-NIE	near Quảng Ngãi	17 November 1973	Douglas C-47B	Saigon-Quang Ngai	Weather, pilot error, CFIT
XV-NUM	Hue Airport	20 February 1974	Douglas C-54A	Quy Nhon–Da Nang	Hijacking
Flight 706	Phan Rang	15 September 1974	Boeing 727-121C	Da Nang–Saigon	Hijacking, loss of control
XV-NUJ	16 mi SW of Pleiku	12 March 1975	Douglas C-54D	Vientiane-Saigon	Unknown (possible shoot down)
Air Volga
Flight designation	Location	Date	Aircraft type	Route	Cause
Flight 1303	Tula Oblast	24 August 2004	Tupolev Tu-134A-3	Moscow-Volgograd	Terrorist bombing
Air West
Flight designation	Location	Date	Aircraft type	Route	Cause
3C-AWU	Nouadhibou	10 April 2001	Antonov An-12BK	Nouadhibou–Nouakchott	Engine Fire; landed on beach
ST-EWB	Khartoum	3 February 2005	Ilyushin Il-76TD	Sharjah–Khartoum	Possible fuel system problems, CFIT
Flight 612	N'Djamena, Chad	24 January 2007	Boeing 737-200	Khartoum–Al Fashir	Hijacking
Airwork
Flight designation	Location	Date	Aircraft type	Route	Cause
ZK-NAN	Blenheim Woodbourne	27 February 2003	Fokker F27-500	?–Blenheim-Woodbourne	Main gear partly collapsed
Flight 23	Stratford, New Zealand	3 May 2005	Fairchild Metro III		Pilot error
Flight 523	Solomon Islands	26 January 2014	Boeing 737-300	Brisbane–Honiara	Maintenance Error
Air Zimbabwe
Flight designation	Location	Date	Aircraft type	Route	Cause
Z-WKU	Shannon Airport	10 March 1997	Boeing 707-330B	Shannon–Harare	Improper maintenance, engine fire
Unknown	Bulawayo Airport	26 January 2008	Xian MA60		Pilot error, tailstrike
Alas Chiricanas
Flight designation	Location	Date	Aircraft type	Route	Cause
Flight 901	Santa Rita Mountains	19 July 1994	Embraer EMB 110P1	Colón–Panama City	Terrorist bombing
Alaska Air Fuel
Flight designation	Location	Date	Aircraft type	Route	Cause
N3054V	Tanana River	23 April 2024	Douglas C-54	Fairbanks–Kobuk	Engine failure, fuel explosion
Alaska Airlines
Flight designation	Location	Date	Aircraft type	Route	Cause
NC21707	Kotzebue Airport	20 July 1947	Lockheed 18-56-23 Lodestar		Rolled over on landing
Flight 009	Seattle-Tacoma International Airport	30 November 1947	Douglas C-54A	Anchorage-Yakutat-Annette Island-Seattle	Ran off runway
Flight 8	27 mi NE of Homer, Alaska	20 January 1949	Douglas C-47A	Homer–Kenai	Pilot error, deviation from course, CFIT
N91008	25 mi NW of McGrath	8 August 1954	Douglas C-47A	McGrath–Colorado Creek	CFIT
Flight 100	4 mi W of Blyn, Washington	2 March 1957	Douglas C-54B	Fairbanks–Seattle	Navigation error, pilot error, CFIT
N11817	Elmendorf AFB	22 February 1960	Douglas C-118A	Anchorage International–Elmendorf AFB	Pilot error
Flight 779 (operating for USAF)	Shemya	21 July 1961	Douglas DC-6A	Everett–Fairfield–Anchorage–Shemya–Tachikawa	ATC error, low visibility, CFIT
N7777C	Kotzebue Airport	17 April 1967	Lockheed L-1049H Super Constellation		Weather, pilot error, belly landing
Flight 1866	Tongass National Forest	4 September 1971	Boeing 727-193	Anchorage–Cordova–Yakutat–Juneau–Sitka–Seattle	Navigation error, CFIT
Flight 60	Ketchikan International Airport	5 April 1976	Boeing 727-81	Juneau-Ketchikan	Runway overrun, pilot error
N766AS	Anchorage International Airport	9 June 1987	Boeing 727-90C	None	Maintenance error, struck walkway
Flight 75	Juneau International Airport	14 August 1998	Boeing 737-490	Seattle–Juneau	Hard landing
Flight 261	off Anacapa Island	31 January 2000	McDonnell Douglas MD-83	Puerto Vallarta–San Francisco–Seattle	Fatigue, horizontal stabilizer failure, loss of control
N764AS	Vancouver International Airport	1 February 2003	Boeing 737-4Q8	Los Angeles–Vancouver	Tailstrike
Flight 1282	Portland, Oregon	5 January, 2024	Boeing 737-Max 9	Portland-Ontario	Equipment error, detached fuselage plug door
Alitalia
Flight designation	Location	Date	Aircraft type	Route	Cause
I-DALO; Ugolino Vivaldi	5 mi N of Civitavecchia	27 January 1951	Savoia-Marchetti SM.95B	Paris–Rome	Lightning strike, in-flight fire
I-LIZT	Ciampino Airport	21 December 1959	Vickers Viscount 785D	None	Loss of control
Flight 618	Shannon	26 February 1960	Douglas DC-7C	Rome–Shannon–New York	Undetermined (loss of altitude while turning)
Flight 771	near Junnar, India	7 July 1962	Douglas DC-8-43	Sydney-Darwin-Singapore-Bangkok–Bombay-Karachi-Tehran-Rome	Navigation error, CFIT
Flight 045	Mount Somma	28 March 1964	Vickers Viscount 785D	Rome–Naples	Pilot error
Flight 660	near Malpensa Airport	2 August 1968	Douglas DC-8-43	Rome–Milan–Montreal	Pilot error
Flight 342	Marignane Airport	2 August 1969	Sud Aviation Caravelle VIN	Rome–Marseille	Pilot error, runway excursion
Flight 713	Damascus	26 June 1970	Douglas DC-8-43	Tehran–Beirut	Struck by missile, forced landing
Flight 618	New York	15 September 1970	Douglas DC-8-62	Rome–New York	ATC errors, loss of control
Flight 112; Antonio Pigafetta	Mount Longa	5 May 1972	Douglas DC-8-43	Rome–Palermo	Pilot error, CFIT
Flight 4128; Isola di Stromboli	Tyrrhenian Sea off Palermo	23 December 1978	Douglas DC-9-32	Rome–Palermo	Pilot error
I-DIKB; Isola di Caprera	Fiumicino Airport	7 January 1980	Douglas DC-9-32	None	Burned during maintenance
Flight 155	Linate Airport	10 December 1980	Douglas DC-9-32	Milan–Rome	Runway collision with a Mitsubishi Mu-2
Flight 404	Stadlerberg	14 November 1990	Douglas DC-9-32	Milan–Zurich	CFIT
Flight 552	Okecie Airport	17 December 1991	Douglas DC-9-32	Rome–Warsaw	Hard landing, runway excursion
Flight 654	Chicago	19 August 1994	McDonnell Douglas MD-11C	Rome–Chicago	Co-pilot error
Flight 600	Newark	22 May 1997	Boeing 767-33AER	Milan–Newark	Co-pilot error, windshear
I-DAVN; Volterra	Fontanarossa Airport	28 January 1999	McDonnell Douglas MD-82	Naples–Catania	Windshear, hard landing
Flight 1553 (operated by Minerva Airlines)	Cristoforo Colombo Airport	25 February 1999	Dornier 328-110	Cagliari–Genoa	Loss of control, ran off runway
Flight 1357	Ronchi dei Legionari Airport	20 April 2004	McDonnell Douglas MD-82	Rome–Trieste	Struck by truck
Flight 1670	Fiumicino Airport	2 February 2013	ATR 72-212A	Pisa–Rome	Crosswinds, runway excursion
Flight 63	Fiumicino Airport	29 September 2013	Airbus A320-216	Madrid–Rome	Landing gear failure
All Nippon Airways (ANA)
Flight designation	Location	Date	Aircraft type	Route	Cause
Flight 025	Pacific Ocean off Toshima	12 August 1958	Douglas C-53	Tokyo–Nagoya	Engine failure, ditching at sea
JA5018	Komaki International Airport	16 March 1960	Douglas C-47	Tokyo–Nagoya	Mid-air collision with a JASDF F-86D
G-APKJ	Osaka-Itami Airport	12 June 1961	Vickers Viscount 744	Tokyo–Osaka	Hard landing, landing gear failure
JA8202	near Nagoya	19 November 1962	Vickers Viscount 828	None	Stall, loss of control
JA5027	Osaka	5 June 1963	Douglas DC-3-201		Swerved off runway, struck an ANA DC-3
JA5080	Mount Nakanoone	14 February 1965	Douglas DC-3 (R4D-1)	Osaka–Tokyo	CFIT
Flight 60	Tokyo Bay off Haneda Airport	4 February 1966	Boeing 727-81	Sapporo–Tokyo	Undetermined
Flight 533	Matsuyama Airport	13 November 1966	NAMC YS-11-111	Osaka–Matsuyama	Landed late, loss of altitude during go-around for reasons unknown
Flight 104	Miyazaki Airport	20 October 1969	NAMC YS-11A-213	Kagoshima–Miyazaki	Runway overrun
JA8743	Hyogo	14 December 1969	NAMC YS-11A-213		Mid-air collision with a Beechcraft C-50
Flight 58	near Shizukuishi	30 July 1971	Boeing 727-281	Sapporo–Tokyo	Mid-air collision with a JASDF F-86F
Flight 391	Hakodate	21 January 2002	Airbus A321-131	Nagoya–Hakodate	Windshear, struck runway
Flight 8254	Shimojishima Airport	26 June 2002	Boeing 767-200		Tailstrike, runway excursion
Flight 1603	Kochi Airport	13 March 2007	Bombardier DHC-8-402Q	Osaka–Kochi	Nosegear failed to extend
JA8955	Don Mueang International Airport	3 August 2008	Boeing 747-481D	None	Caught fire during cleaning, burned out
JA56AN	Haneda Airport	10 August 2009	Boeing 737-881	Tottori–Tokyo	Tailstrike
Flight 731	Sendai Airport	5 February 2012	Airbus A320-211	Osaka–Sendai	Pilot error, tailstrike
Flight 956	Narita International Airport	20 June 2012	Boeing 767-381ER	Beijing–Tokyo	Under investigation (hard landing)
Allegheny Airlines
Flight designation	Location	Date	Aircraft type	Route	Cause
N172A	New Castle County Airport	14 November 1955	Martin 2-0-2	None	Caught fire on approach, left landing gear collapsed
Flight 371	near Williamsport	1 December 1959	Martin 2-0-2	Philadelphia–Harrisburg–Williamsport–Bradford–Erie–Cleveland	CFIT
Flight 604	near Montoursville	23 July 1965	Convair 440	Pittsburgh-Dubois-Phillipsburg-Williamsport–Wilkes Barre	Engine fire, crew error, CFIT
Flight 305	Harrisburg Airport	29 November 1966	Convair 440	Harrisburg–Pittsburgh	Electrical failure, runway overrun
Flight 736	near Bradford Airport	24 December 1968	Convair 580	Detroit-Erie–Bradford-Harrisburg-Washington DC	Pilot error, navigation, poor visibility
Flight 737	near Bradford Airport	6 January 1969	Convair 580	Washington DC-Harrisburg–Bradford-Erie-Detroit	CFIT for reasons unknown
Flight 853	Fairland, Indiana	9 September 1969	Douglas DC-9-31	Cincinnati–Indianapolis	Mid-air collision with a Piper PA-28
Flight 485	new New Haven Airport	7 June 1971	Convair 580	Groton–New Haven	Low visibility, unexplained descent, CFIT
N5844	Pittsburgh International Airport	20 August 1971	Convair 580	Parkersburg–Pittsburgh	Landing gear failure
Flight 453	Monroe County Airport	9 July 1978	BAC 1-11-203AE	Boston–Rochester	Unexplained crew error, runway excursion
Flight 561	Benedum Airport	12 February 1979	Mohawk 298	Clarksburg–Washington	Wing and tail icing, loss of control
ALM
Flight designation	Location	Date	Aircraft type	Route	Cause
Flight 980	Caribbean Sea	2 May 1970	Douglas DC-9-33CF	New York–St. Maarten	Pilot error, fuel exhaustion, water ditching
Aloha Airlines
Flight designation	Location	Date	Aircraft type	Route	Cause
N7410	Honolulu International Airport	27 June 1969	Vickers Viscount 754D	Honolulu–Molokai	Hydraulic failure, collision with a Hawaiian Airlines DC-9
Flight 845	Honolulu International Airport	8 August 1971	Vickers Viscount 745D	Hilo–Honolulu	Overheated battery, in-flight fire
Flight 243	Kahului, Hawaii	28 April 1988	Boeing 737-297	Hilo–Honolulu	Explosive decompression
Alrosa Mirny Air Enterprise
Flight designation	Location	Date	Aircraft type	Route	Cause
Flight 514	Izhma Airport	7 September 2010	Tupolev Tu-154M	Udachny–Moscow	Loss of electrical power, runway overrun
America West Airlines
Flight designation	Location	Date	Aircraft type	Route	Cause
N198AW	Tucson	30 December 1989	Boeing 737-204	Phoenix–Tucson	Runway excursion
Flight 2433	Sky Harbor International Airport	15 October 1999	Airbus A320	Phoenix–Tucson	Collision with a pedestrian walkway (during pushback)
Flight 2747	McCarran International Airport	12 June 2000	Airbus A320-232	Las Vegas–Columbus	Maintenance error
Flight 598	Kansas City International Airport	25 August 2001	Boeing 737-3G7	Phoenix–Kansas City	Runway excursion
Flight 556	Miami International Airport	1 July 2002	Airbus A319	Miami-Phoenix	Pilots were intoxicated
Flight 794	Sky Harbor International Airport	28 August 2002	Airbus A320-231	Houston–Phoenix	Loss of control, runway excursion
American Airlines
American Eagle
Flight designation	Location	Date	Aircraft type	Route	Cause
Flight 4184	Roselawn, Indiana	31 October 1994	ATR 72-200	Indianapolis–Chicago	Wing icing
Flight 5401	San Juan, Puerto Rico	9 May 2004	ATR 72-200		Pilot error
American Flyers Airline (AFA)
Flight designation	Location	Date	Aircraft type	Route	Cause
Flight 280/D	near Ardmore, Oklahoma	22 April 1966	Lockheed L-188C Electra	Monterey–Ardmore–Columbus	Pilot incapacitation
Angara Airlines
Flight designation	Location	Date	Aircraft type	Route	Cause
Flight 9007	Ob River	11 July 2011	Antonov An-24RV	Tomsk–Surgut	Engine fire, water ditching
Flight 200	Nizhneangarsk Airport	27 June 2019	Antonov An-24RV	Nizhneangarsk–Ulan-Ude	Under investigation (runway excursion)
Ansett Airlines
Flight designation	Location	Date	Aircraft type	Route	Cause
VH-FNE	Melbourne	26 March 1971	Fokker F27	None	Destroyed in hangar fire
Flight 232	Alice Springs	15 November 1972	Fokker F27	Adelaide–Alice Springs	Hijacking
Ansett New Zealand
Flight designation	Location	Date	Aircraft type	Route	Cause
Flight 703	Tararua Range	5 June 1995	de Havilland Canada DHC-8-102	Auckland–Palmerston North	CFIT
Aquila Airways
Flight designation	Location	Date	Aircraft type	Route	Cause
G-AGKY	off Calshot	28 January 1953	Short Sunderland 3	Southampton water–Lisbon	Weather, pilot error
G-ANAK	Hamble	27 November 1954	Short Sunderland 5	None	Damaged by wind
G-ANAJ	Santa Margherita	26 September 1956	Short Solent 3	None	Damaged by wind, blown onto shore
G-AKNU	Chessel Down	15 November 1957	Short Solent 3	Southampton water–Lisbon	Double engine failure
Ariana Afghan Airlines
Flight designation	Location	Date	Aircraft type	Route	Cause
Flight 202	Aramoun	21 November 1959	Douglas DC-4	Beirut–Mehrabad–Kandahar–Kabul	Navigation error or in-flight fire, CFIT
Flight 701	Fernhill	5 January 1969	Boeing 727-113C	Kabul–Kandahar–Istanbul–Frankfurt–London	Pilot error, poor visibility, CFIT
YA-AAB	Kabul Airport	15 January 1969	Douglas C-47		Ground collision with an Ariana DC-6
YA-BAK	Zabol Airport	18 June 1989	Antonov An-26	Kabul–Zaranj	Rear door opened in flight, forced landing
YA-BAO	Jalalabad Airport	11 September 1995	Antonov An-26B	Kabul–Jalalabad	Fuel exhaustion (probable)
YA-KAE	Jalalabad Airport	29 October 1997	Yakovlev Yak-40		Crashed on landing
YA-FAZ	Shakh-e Barantay Mountain	19 March 1998	Boeing 727-228	Sharjah–Kandahar–Kabul	Weather, poor visibility, CFIT
Flight 805	Stansted Airport	6 February 2000	Boeing 727-228	Kabul–Mazar-i-Sharif	Hijacking
Flight 719	Atatürk International Airport	23 March 2007	Airbus A300B4-203		Runway overrun on landing
Flight 312	Kabul Airport	8 May 2014	Boeing 737-4Y0	Delhi–Kabul	Weather, pilot error, slid off runway on landing
Flight 252	Kabul Airport	7 November 2014	Boeing 737-4Y0	Herat–Kabul	Hard landing, landing gear failure
Armavia
Flight designation	Location	Date	Aircraft type	Route	Cause
Flight 967	Black Sea	3 May 2006	Airbus A320-211	Yerevan–Sochi	Pilot error, CFIT
EK32010	Zaventem Airport	5 May 2006	Airbus A320-211	None	Burned in hangar fire
Arrow Air
Flight designation	Location	Date	Aircraft type	Route	Cause
Flight 1285	Gander	12 December 1985	Douglas DC-8-63CF	Gander–Fort Campbell	Icing
N1804	Changi Airport	13 December 2002	Douglas DC-8-62F	Tokyo–Singapore	Runway overrun
N68047	Augusto C Sandino Airport	4 June 2006	McDonnell Douglas DC-10-10F	Miami–Managua	Runway overrun
Arkia
Flight designation	Location	Date	Aircraft type	Route	Cause
4X-AVC	Tel Aviv	26 October 1969	Vickers Viscount 833		Crashed during training flight
4X-AIP	Rosh Pinah	23 July 1996	IAI Westwind 1124	Eilat–Rosh Pina	Veered off runway
Flight 582	near Mombassa, Kenya	28 November 2002	Boeing 757-3E7	Mombassa–Tel Aviv	Attempted shoot-down
Asiana Airlines
Flight designation	Location	Date	Aircraft type	Route	Cause
Flight 833	Cheju Airport	16 January 1992	Boeing 767-38E	Seoul-Cheju	Hard landing
Flight 733	Mokpo, South Korea	26 July 1993	Boeing 737-5L9	Seoul–Mokpo	Weather, CFIT
Flight 1125	Kansai International Airport	28 October 2009	Airbus A321	Seoul–Osaka	Tailstrike
Flight 991	off Jeju Island	28 July 2011	Boeing 747-48EF	Incheon–Shanghai	In-flight fire, crashed at sea
Flight 340	Incheon International Airport	16 April 2013	Airbus A321-231	Harbin–Seoul	Tailstrike
Flight 214	San Francisco International Airport	6 July 2013	Boeing 777-28EER	Incheon–San Francisco	Excessive descent, CFIT
Flight 162	Hiroshima Airport	14 April 2015	Airbus A320-232	Incheon–Hiroshima	Crashed short of runway
Asian Spirit
Flight designation	Location	Date	Aircraft type	Route	Cause
Flight 100	Nueva Vizcaya	7 December 1999	Let L-410UVP-E	Kasibu	CFIT
Flight 897	Ninoy Aquino International Airport	4 September 2002	de Havilland Canada DHC-7-102	Manila–Caticlan	Runway excursion
Flight 587	Catarman National Airport	14 November 2005	BAe 146-200	Manila–Catarman	Runway overrun
Flight 321	Masbate Airport	2 January 2008	NAMC YS-11A-500	Manila–Masbate	Runway overshoot
ASL Airlines Hungary
Flight designation	Location	Date	Aircraft type	Route	Cause
Flight 7332	Il Caravaggio International Airport	5 August 2016	Boeing 737-476SF	Paris-Bergamo	Pilot error, runway overrun
Aero Trasporti Italiani (ATI)
Flight designation	Location	Date	Aircraft type	Route	Cause
Flight 460	Conca di Crezzo, Italy	15 October 1987	ATR 42-312	Milan-Cologne	Icing, Loss of control
I-ATIT	Reggio	24 May 1969	Fokker F27 Friendship	Rome–Reggio	Landing gear struck an embankment
Flight 392	Ardinello	16 April 1972	Fokker F27 Friendship	Rome–Foggia	Loss of Control
Flight 327	Poggiorsini	30 October 1972	Fokker F27 Friendship	Naples–Bari	CFIT
Flight 12	Sarroch	14 September 1979	McDonnell Douglas DC-9	Alghero–Cagliari	CFIT
Atlantic Southeast Airlines (ASA)
Flight designation	Location	Date	Aircraft type	Route	Cause
Flight 2311	Brunswick, Georgia	5 April 1991	Embraer EMB 120RT	Atlanta–Brunswick	Propeller control unit malfunction due to design flaw
Flight 529	Carrollton, Georgia	21 August 1995	Embraer EMB 120RT	Atlanta–Biloxi	Improper maintenance, propeller failure
Atlas Air
Flight designation	Location	Date	Aircraft type	Route	Cause
Flight 3591 (operated for Amazon Air)	Trinity Bay, near Anahuac, Texas	23 February 2019	Boeing 767-375ER (BCF)	Miami–Houston	Crew errors, spatial disorientation, loss of control
Austral Líneas Aéreas
Flight designation	Location	Date	Aircraft type	Route	Cause
Flight 9	13 mi E of San Carlos de Bariloche	21 November 1977	BAC 1-11-400	Buenos Aires–San Carlos de Bariloche	Crew error, CFIT
Flight 901	near Aeroparque Jorge Newbery	7 May 1981	BAC 1-11-500	Tucumán–Buenos Aires	Weather, pilot error, loss of control
Flight 46	near Posadas Airport	12 June 1988	Douglas DC-9-81	Buenos Aires-Resistencia-Posadas	Poor visibility, crashed short of runway
Flight 2553	Uruguay	10 October 1997	Douglas DC-9	Posadas - Buenos Aires	Mechanical failure
Australian National Airways
Flight designation	Location	Date	Aircraft type	Route	Cause
VH-UMF; Southern Cloud	Snowy Mountains	21 March 1931	Avro 618 Ten	Sydney–Melbourne	Weather
VH-UMA; Southern Sun	Alor Setar	26 November 1931	Avro 618 Ten		Possible engine failure, waterlogged runway, failed to takeoff
Australian National Airways (ANA)
Flight designation	Location	Date	Aircraft type	Route	Cause
VH-UYC; Kyeema	Mount Dandenong	25 October 1938	Douglas DC-2-210	Adelaide–Melbourne	Weather, pilot error, spatial disorientation
VH-UYB; Pengana	Mascot Airport	28 September 1939	Douglas DC-2-210		Runway overrun
VH-USY; Bungana	near Dimboola	8 February 1940	Douglas DC-2-185		Engine fire
VH-UXZ; Marika	off Flinders Island	29 May 1942	de Havilland DH.89A Dragon Rapide	Melbourne–Flinders Island	Engine failure, crashed at sea
VH-ADQ	near Bendigo	3 December 1943	Douglas DC-2	Sydney–Melbourne	Navigation error
VH-UYY; Tokana	near Heathcote	31 January 1945	Stinson Model A-2W	Melbourne–Kerang–Mildura–Broken Hill	Metal fatigue, wing separation
VH-CDC (operating for USAAC)	off Tacloban Airport	13 November 1945	Douglas C-49A	Manila–Tacloban	Weather, pilot error
VH-AET	Derwent River	10 March 1946	Douglas C-47	Hobart-Melbourne	Unknown (possible crew error)
Flight 331; Lutana	near Quirindi	2 September 1948	Douglas C-47A	Brisbane–Sydney	Navigation error, CFIT
VH-ABR; Kanana	near Yass	4 October 1948	Douglas DC-3-202A		Engine fire
VH-UZK; Kurana	Mount Macedon	8 November 1948	Douglas DC-3-232	Melbourne–Deniliquin	Deviation from course, disregard of procedure
VH-UZJ; Kyilla	near Mangalore	29 December 1948	Douglas DC-3-232	Launceston–Melbourne	Pilot error, crashed short of runway
VH-ANA; Amana	near York	26 June 1950	Douglas DC-4-1009	Perth–Adelaide	Total loss of engine power for reasons unknown, CFIT
Austrian Airlines
Flight designation	Location	Date	Aircraft type	Route	Cause
Flight 901	near Sheremetyevo Airport	26 September 1960	Vickers Viscount 837	Vienna–Warsaw–Moscow	Premature descent for reasons unknown
AVAir
Flight designation	Location	Date	Aircraft type	Route	Cause
Flight 3378	Cary, North Carolina	19 February 1988	Swearingen Metro III	Raleigh/Durham–Richmond	Pilot error, CFIT
Aviaco
Flight designation	Location	Date	Aircraft type	Route	Cause
Flight 118	Montrove, Spain	13 August 1973	Sud Aviation Caravelle	Madrid–A Coruña	CFIT
Avianca
Flight designation	Location	Date	Aircraft type	Route	Cause
C-114	19 mi NW of Bogotá	15 February 1947	Douglas DC-4	Barranquilla-Bogotá	Low visibility, CFIT
HK-120	near Chimborazo Mountain	2 May 1950	Douglas C-47	Quito-Guayaquil	CFIT
HK-160	Manizales, Colombia	11 January 1954	Douglas C-47A	Medellin-Armenia	CFIT
HK-163	near Lajes Airport	9 August 1954	Lockheed L-749A-79 Constellation	Terceira–Bermuda	Pilot error, CFIT
HK-155	20 W of Tulua	9 March 1957	Douglas C-47	Condoto–Cali–Condoto	Weather, pilot error, CFIT
Flight 667	Cerro Baco	23 June 1959	Douglas DC-4	Quito–Lima	CFIT
Flight 671	Montego Bay Airport	21 January 1960	Lockheed L-1049E-55 Super Constellation	New York-Montego Bay-Barranquilla-Bogotá	Heavy landing, ran off runway
HK-502	Municipio de Marulanda	25 February 1962	Douglas C-47A	Manizales–Bogotà	Pilot error
HK-319	near Condoto	15 September 1964	Douglas C-47A	Condoto–Medellín	Shifted cargo, loss of control
Flight 676	Pan de Azucar Peak	22 March 1965	Douglas C-47	Bogotà–Bucaramanga	Pilot error, CFIT
Flight 508	Bucaramanga	17 October 1965	Douglas DC-3	Bogotà–Bucaramanga	Mid-air collision with a Piper Super Cub
Flight 4	off Crespo Airport	14 January 1966	Douglas C-54B	Cartagena–Bogotà	Maintenance error, pilot error, controlled flight into water
Flight 870	near Eldorado Airport	22 September 1966	Douglas DC-4-1009	Bogotà–Barranquilla	Engine problems, CFIT
Flight 729	near Casubel River	24 December 1966	Douglas C-47A	Bogotà–Cali–Pasto	CFIT
HK-326	near Sogamoso Airport	26 April 1967	Douglas C-47		Loss of altitude, CFIT
Flight 011	Madrid	27 November 1983	Boeing 747-200B	Frankfurt–Bogotà	Pilot error, CFIT
Flight 410	Cúcuta	17 March 1988	Boeing 727	Cúcuta–Cartagena	Pilot error, CFIT
Flight 203	Soacha	27 November 1989	Boeing 727	Bogotà–Cali	Terrorism, bombing
Flight 52	Cove Neck, New York	25 January 1990	Boeing 707-300	Bogotà–New York	Fuel exhaustion and pilot error
Aviastar-TU
Flight designation	Location	Date	Aircraft type	Route	Cause
Flight 1906	near Aviogorodok	22 March 2010	Tupolev Tu-204-100	Hurgada–Moscow	Pilot error
Aviateca (now Avianca Guatemala)
Flight designation	Location	Date	Aircraft type	Route	Cause
TG-AQA	Cerro Tecpan	15 December 1953	Curtiss C-46D	Brownsville–Guatemala City	CFIT
TG-AJA	Guatemala City	8 October 1954	Douglas C-47A		Crashed during forced landing
TG-AHA	Sierra de Las Minas	24 May 1956	Douglas C-47	Guatemala City–La Tinta–Puerto Barrios	CFIT
TG-ACA	15 mi S of La Aurora Airport	11 May 1971	Curtiss C-46A	Guatemala City–Flores	CFIT
TG-AMA	El Peten Airport	17 February 1975	Douglas C-47A	None	Burned on the ground
TG-ACA	near Guatemala City	28 April 1977	Convair 440		Improper maintenance, engine failure
TG-AKA	Santa Elena Airport	30 September 1977	Douglas C-47A		Hard landing, runway excursion, propeller separation
TG-ADA	Guatemala City	8 June 1978	Douglas DC-6B		Shifting cargo, loss of control, possible engine problems
TG-ATA	Flores	26 July 1978	Douglas DC-3		Bird strike, forced landing
Flight 901	San Vincente Volcano	9 August 1995	Boeing 737-2H6	Miami–Guatemala City–San Salvador–Managua–San José	Weather, pilot error, CFIT
Avis-Amur
Flight designation	Location	Date	Aircraft type	Route	Cause
Flight 9209 (leased from KnAAPO)	86 km (54 mi) SW of Omsukchan, Russia	9 August 2011	Antonov An-12AP	Komsomolsk-on-Amur–Magadan–Keperveyem	In-flight fire, loss of control
Azerbaijan Airlines
Flight designation	Location	Date	Aircraft type	Route	Cause
4K-401	near Baku Airport	30 November 1995	Boeing 707-323C	Ürümqi-Baku	CFIT
Flight A-56	near Nakhchivan	5 December 1995	Tupolev Tu-134B-3	Nakhchivan-Baku	Improper maintenance, pilot error, double engine failure
4K-87504	near Gyandzha Airport	15 May 1997	Yakovlev Yak-40	None	Struck by stray bullets, in-flight fire, loss of control
Flight 154	Baku Airport	18 August 2000	Tupolev Tu-154	Nakhchivan-Baku	Hijacking
Flight 217; Yevlakh	near Nadaran	23 December 2005	Antonov An-140-100	Baku-Ataku	Instrument failure, loss of control
Flight 75; Guba	Atatürk International Airport	12 August 2010	Airbus A319	Baku-Istanbul	Runway excursion, nosegear collapse
Flight 8243; Gusar	near Aktau International Airport	25 December 2024	Embraer 190AR	Baku–Grozny	Under investigation (possible accidental shootdown)

== B ==
Bahamasair
Flight designation	Location	Date	Aircraft type	Route	Cause
Flight 353	Governor's Harbour Airport	20 April 2007	de Havilland Canada Dash 8-301	Nassau–Governor's Harbour	Landing gear collapsed on landing
Bakhtar Afghan Airlines
Flight designation	Location	Date	Aircraft type	Route	Cause
YA-KAD	Khost	25 January 1972	Yakovlev Yak-40		Struck trees, crashed short of runway
YA-GAT	Bamyan Airport	18 April 1973	de Havilland Canada Twin Otter 100	Bamyan–Kabul	Loss of control on takeoff
YA-GAZ	Shashgow Ghazni	10 March 1983	de Havilland Canada Twin Otter 300	Uruzgan–Kabul	Weather, pilot incapacitation
YA-BAM	near Kandahar	4 September 1985	Antonov An-26	Kandahar–Farah	Shot down
YA-BAL	near Khost	11 June 1987	Antonov An-26	Kandahar–Kabul	Shot down
Balkan Bulgarian Airlines
Flight designation	Location	Date	Aircraft type	Route	Cause
Flight 130	Zurich	18 January 1971	Ilyushin Il-18D	Paris–Zurich	Pilot error
LZ-BES	Sofia Airport	21 December 1971	Ilyushin Il-18V	Sofia–Algiers	Maintenance error, loss of control
LZ-ILA	near Smolyan	4 November 1972	Ilyushin Il-14P	Bourgas–Sofia	ATC error, CFIT
Flight 307	near Moscow	3 March 1973	Ilyushin Il-18V	Sofia–Moscow	Icing
LZ-ANA	near Sofia Airport	22 November 1975	Antonov An-24B	Sofia–Varna	Icing, failed to take off
LZ-BTN (operated by Libyan Arab Airlines)	near Al Bayda, Lebanon	2 December 1977	Tupolev Tu-154A	Jeddah–Benghazi–Tripoli	Fuel exhaustion
LZ-TUB	Gabare, Bulgaria	16 March 1978	Tupolev Tu-134A	Sofia–Warsaw	Unknown
LZ-TUR	Sofia Airport	10 January 1984	Tupolev Tu-134A	East Berlin–Sofia	Crew error in bad weather
LZ-DOK	Sofia	2 August 1988	Yakovlev Yak-40	Sofia–Varna	In-flight fire, possible crew error
Banat Air
Flight designation	Location	Date	Aircraft type	Route	Cause
Flight 166 (leased from Romavia)	Verona, Italy	13 December 1995	Antonov An-24B	Verona–Timişoara	Bad weather, wing icing, overloading, human error, CFIT
Bangkok Airways
Flight designation	Location	Date	Aircraft type	Route	Cause
Flight 125	near Koh Samui	21 November 1990	de Havilland Canada Dash 8-103	Bangkok–Koh Samui	Bad weather
Flight 266; Pha Ngan	Koh Samui	4 August 2009	ATR 72–212A	Krabi–Koh Samui	Skidded off runway
BAL Bashkirian Airlines
Flight designation	Location	Date	Aircraft type	Route	Cause
Flight 2937	Überlingen	1 July 2002	Tupolev Tu-154M	Moscow–Barcelona	Mid-air collision with a DHL Boeing 757
Bek Air
Flight designation	Location	Date	Aircraft type	Route	Cause
Flight 2100	near Almaty	27 December 2019	Fokker 100	Almaty–Nur-Sultan	Under investigation (CFIT)
Belavia
Flight designation	Location	Date	Aircraft type	Route	Cause
Flight 1834	Yerevan	14 February 2008	Bombardier CRJ-100LR	Yerevan–Minsk	Wing icing
Biman Bangladesh Airlines
Flight designation	Location	Date	Aircraft type	Route	Cause
S2-ABJ	near Zia International Airport	5 August 1984	Fokker F27-600	Chittagong–Dhaka	CFIT due to bad weather
Blue Wing Airlines
Flight designation	Location	Date	Aircraft type	Route	Cause
PZ-TSO	Antino Airport	3 April 2008	Antonov An-28	Paramaribo–Lawa	CFIT
Boeing Air Transport
Flight designation	Location	Date	Aircraft type	Route	Cause
NC280	Marquette, Nebraska	26 February 1928	Boeing 40B	Omaha–Cheyenne	Propeller blade failure, loss of control
NC184E	Brawnson, Nebraska	10 January 1930	Boeing 95	San Francisco–Chicago	Crashed while attempting an emergency landing
NC286	Salt Lake City	23 November 1931	Boeing 40B	Oakland–Salt Lake City	Low visibility
NC291	Rio Vista, California	2 February 1932	Boeing 40B	Oakland–Reno	Weather, crashed on landing
Bonanza Air Lines
Flight designation	Location	Date	Aircraft type	Route	Cause
Flight 114	Las Vegas	15 November 1964	Fairchild F-27A	Phoenix–Las Vegas	CFIT
Braathens SAFE
Flight designation	Location	Date	Aircraft type	Route	Cause
Flight 253; Lars	Hummelfjell	7 November 1956	de Havilland Heron 2B	Trondheim–Oslo	CFIT
Flight 239; Sverre Sigursson	Asker	23 December 1972	Fokker F-28 Fellowship 1000	Ålesund–Oslo	Weather, pilot error
Flight 139; Harald Gille	Oslo Airport	21 June 1985	Boeing 737-200	Trondheim–Oslo	Hijacking
Braniff International Airways
Flight designation	Location	Date	Aircraft type	Route	Cause
NC8497	Chicago	12 July 1931	Lockheed Vega DL-1B	Chicago–Detroit	Engine failure
NC433E	Kewanee, Illinois	5 December 1931	Lockheed Vega 5C	Kansas City–Chicago	Weather, CFIT
NC106W	Columbia	8 December 1934	Lockheed Vega 5B	Kansas City–Columbia	Icing, loss of control
NC980Y	near Fort Worth	9 November 1935	Lockheed Vega 5C		Weather
Flight 1	Oklahoma City	26 March 1939	Douglas DC-2-112	Chicago–Kansas City–Wichita–Oklahoma City–Dallas	Engine failure, stall, loss of control
Flight 152	16 mi S of Mason City, Iowa	22 August 1954	Douglas C-47	Memphis–Minneapolis	Weather, windshear, loss of control
Flight 560	Chicago-Midway Airport	17 July 1955	Convair CV-340-32	Dallas–Oklahoma City–Wichita–Kansas City–Chicago	Spatial disorientation
Flight 971	near Miami	25 March 1958	Douglas DC-7C	Miami–Panama City	Engine fire, pilot error
Flight 542	3 mi SE of Buffalo, Texas	29 September 1959	Lockheed L-188A Electra	Houston–Dallas	In-flight breakup
Flight 250	Falls City, Nebraska	6 August 1966	BAC 1-11-203AE	New Orleans–Shreveport–Fort Smith–Tulsa–Kansas City–Omaha–Minneapolis	Weather, severe turbulence, in-flight breakup
Flight 352	Dawson, Texas	3 May 1968	Lockheed L-188A Electra	Houston–Dallas	Pilot error, weather, in-flight breakup
Flight 14	Buenos Aires	2 July 1971	Boeing 707	Acapulco–New York	Hijacking
Flight 38	Dallas	12 January 1972	Boeing 727	Houston–Dallas	Hijacking
Flight 920	Lima, Peru	29 August 1980	Douglas DC-8	Lima–Los Angeles	Hijacking
Bristow Helicopters
Flight designation	Location	Date	Aircraft type	Route	Cause
Flight 56C	Near the Brae Alpha oil rig	19 January 1995	Eurocopter AS332 Super Puma		Lightning strike, tail rotor failure
Britannia Airways (now TUI Airways)
Flight designation	Location	Date	Aircraft type	Route	Cause
Flight 105	Ljubljana	1 September 1966	Bristol Britannia 102	Luton–Ljubljana	Pilot error, incorrect altimeter setting
Flight 226A	Costa Brava Airport	14 September 1999	Boeing 757-204	Cardiff–Gerona	Weather, pilot, ATC errors
British Airtours
Flight designation	Location	Date	Aircraft type	Route	Cause
G-APFK	Prestwick Airport	17 March 1977	Boeing 707-436	None	Loss of control
Flight 28M; River Orrin	Manchester	22 August 1985	Boeing 737-236	Manchester–Corfu	Engine failure, ground fire
British Airways
Flight designation	Location	Date	Aircraft type	Route	Cause
Flight 476	near Vrbovec	10 September 1976	Hawker Siddeley Trident 3B	London–Istanbul	Mid-air collision with an Inex-Adria DC-9
Flight 9 City of Edinburgh	Jakarta	24 June 1982	Boeing 747-236B	London–Bombay–Kuala Lumpur–Perth–Melbourne–Auckland	Volcanic ash ingestion, engine flameout
Flight 5390; County of South Glamorgan	over Didcot	10 June 1990	BAC 1-11-528FL	Birmingham–Malaga	Windshield failure, explosive decompression
Flight 149; City of Leeds	Kuwait City	1 August 1990	Boeing 747-136	London–Kuwait City–Madras (now Chennai)–Kuala Lumpur	Crew and passengers held hostage, aircraft later blown up
Flight 2069	over Sudan	29 December 2000	Boeing 747-436	London–Nairobi	Attempted hijacking
Flight 268	over Los Angeles	20 February 2005	Boeing 747-436	Los Angeles–London	Engine malfunction, engine fire
Flight 38	Heathrow Airport	17 January 2008	Boeing 777-236ER	Beijing–London	Fuel starvation, crashed short of runway
Flight 2276	McCarran International Airport	8 September 2015	Boeing 777-236ER	Las Vegas–London	Uncontained engine failure, in-flight fire
British Commonwealth Pacific Airlines (BCPA)
Flight designation	Location	Date	Aircraft type	Route	Cause
Flight 304; Resolution	San Francisco	29 October 1953	Douglas DC-6	Sydney–Nadi–Canton Island–Honolulu–San Francisco	Weather, crew error
British European Airways (BEA)
Flight designation	Location	Date	Aircraft type	Route	Cause
Flight 530	12 mi N of Oslo	7 August 1946	Douglas C-47A	Croydon–Oslo	Pilot error
G-AHPK	Ruislip	6 January 1948	Vickers Viking 1B	Glasgow–Northolt	Poor visibility, CFIT
G-AIVP	near RAF Gatow	5 April 1948	Vickers Viking 1B	London–West Berlin	Mid-air collision with a Soviet Air Force Yak-3
Flight S200P	Irish Law Mountain	21 April 1948	Vickers Viking 1B	London–Glasgow	CFIT
G-AHCW	over Exhall	19 February 1949	Douglas Dakota C.3	London–Glasgow	Mid-air collision with an RAF Avro Anson
G-AHCY	near Oldham	19 August 1949	Douglas C-47A	Belfast–Manchester	Pilot error, CFIT
G-AIVL; Vigilant	English Channel	13 April 1950	Vickers Viking 1B	London–Paris	Bombing
G-AGIW	Mill Hill	17 October 1950	Douglas Dakota C.3	London–Glasgow	Engine failure, loss of control
G-AHPN	London Heathrow Airport	31 October 1950	Vickers Viking 1B	Paris–London	Poor visibility, crash on landing
G-AJDL; Lord St. Vincent	Nutts Corner Airport	5 January 1953	Vickers Viking 1B	London-Belfast	Pilot error
Flight 411; RMA Discovery	Wythenshawe	14 March 1957	Vickers Viscount 701	Amsterdam–Manchester	Metal fatigue, loss of control
G-AOJA	Nutts Corner	23 October 1957	Vickers Viscount 802	London–Belfast	Undetermined
Flight 609; Lord Burleigh	Munich	6 February 1958	Airspeed Ambassador 2	Belgrade–Munich–Manchester	Weather
Flight 142	Anzio	22 October 1958	Vickers Viscount 701C	London–Naples	Mid-air collision with an Italian Air Force F-86
G-APEE	London Heathrow Airport	27 October 1965	Vickers Vanguard	Edinburgh–London	Pilot error
Flight 706	near Aarsele	2 October 1971	Vickers Vanguard	London–Salzburg	Corrosion, explosive decompression
Flight 548	Staines	18 June 1972	Hawker Siddeley Trident 1C	London–Brussels	Crew error
British Midland International
Flight designation	Location	Date	Aircraft type	Route	Cause
G-ALHG	Stockport	4 June 1967	Canadair C-4 Argonaut	Palma–Manchester	Fuel starvation
Flight 092	M1 near Kegworth	8 January 1989	Boeing 737-4Y0	London–Belfast	Engine failure, pilot error
British Overseas Airways Corporation (BOAC)
Flight designation	Location	Date	Aircraft type	Route	Cause
G-AFYU	off Malta	21 December 1939	Lockheed 14 Super Electra	Malta–London	Water ditching
G-ADSZ	Merville Airport	23 May 1940	Armstrong Whitworth Ensign 1		Attacked by German fighter, stall, loss of control
G-ADUX; Cassiopeia	Sabang, Indonesia	29 December 1941	Short Empire		Struck debris on takeoff
G-AFCZ; Australia	Atlantic Ocean off Senegal	24 September 1942	Short Empire	Lagos–Bathurst–Lisbon–Poole	Unknown (loss of control or in-flight explosion)
G-AFCK; Golden Horn	Tagus River off Lisbon	9 January 1943	Short G Class	Lisbon–London	Engine failure, in-flight fire
G-AFYE	Asmara, Eritrea	15 February 1943	de Havilland Flamingo	None	Went into a dive
G-AGDA; Dog-Able	Poole Harbor	23 March 1943	Consolidated PBY-5A Catalina	None	Crashed on landing
G-AGEJ	Atlantic Ocean off Denmark	4 April 1943	Lockheed C-56B	Stockholm–London	Shot down by German fighter
Flight 777 (operated by KLM)	Bay of Biscay	1 June 1943	Douglas DC-3-194	Lisbon–Bristol	Attacked by German fighters
FK459 (leased from RAF)	Khartoum Civil Airport	16 June 1943	Lockheed Hudson VI		Possible fuel starvation, engine failure, loss of control
FK618 (leased from RAF)	near Khartoum	30 June 1943	Lockheed Hudson VI		Possible overloading, loss of control
G-AGES	near Brandon, Ireland	28 July 1943	Short Sunderland III	Lisbon–Foynes	CFIT
G-AGIB	75 mi SSW of Sollum, Libya	5 November 1943	Short Sunderland III	Rod-el-Farag–Djemba–Poole	Electrical problems, in-flight fire, wing separation
G-AGDE	15 mi off Leuchars, Scotland	17 December 1943	Lockheed 18–56 Lodestar	Leuchars–Stockholm	CFIT
G-AGIH	Mount Kinnekulle	29 August 1944	Lockheed C-60A	Stockholm–Leuchars	Low visibility, radio failure, navigation error, CFIT
G-AGLX (operated by Qantas)	Indian Ocean	23 March 1946	Avro Lancastrian 1	London–Karachi–Colombo–Cocos Island–Sydney	Unexplained disappearance
G-AGHT	Luqa Airport	14 August 1946	Douglas C-47A	Luqa–Londres	Pilot error, fuel exhaustion, double engine failure
G-AGJX	Stowting, Kent	11 January 1947	Douglas C-47A	London–Bordeaux	Weather, pilot error, crew error
G-AGNR	Az-Zubair, Iran	16 July 1947	Avro York C.1	London–Malta–Cairo–Basrah–Karachi–Delhi–Calcutta	Weather, pilot error, ATC error
G-AHZB	Bahrain Marine Air Base	23 August 1947	Short Sandringham 5	Hong Kong–Karachi–Bahrain–London	Pilot error, hard landing
Flight 251	71 mi SSE of Atar, Mauritania	26 May 1952	Handley Page Hermes IV	London–Tripoli–Kano	Navigation error, fuel exhaustion, forced landing
Flight 115	Ciampino Airport	26 October 1952	de Havilland Comet 1A	London–Rome–Cairo–Johannesburg	Pilot error, runway overrun
Flight 783	near Calcutta	2 May 1953	de Havilland Comet 1	Calcutta–Delhi	Weather, in-flight breakup
G-ALYR	Calcutta	25 July 1953	de Havilland Comet 1		Ran off runway
Flight 781	Mediterranean Sea	10 January 1954	de Havilland Comet 1	Singapore–Rome–London	Metal fatigue, in-flight breakup
G-ALAM; Belfast	Kallang Airport	13 March 1954	Lockheed L-749A Constellation	Jakarta–Singapore	Crashed short of runway, pilot fatigue
G-ALSA; RMA Cathay	Prestwick Airport	25 December 1954	Boeing 377-10-28 Stratocruiser	London–Prestwick–Shannon–Gander–New York	Pilot error
G-ALHL	Tripoli Int'l Airport	21 September 1955	Canadair C-4 Argonaut	London–Kano–Rome–Tripoli	Pilot error
G-ALHE	near Kano Airport	24 June 1956	Canadair C-4 Argonaut	Lagos–Kano–Tripoli–London	Windshear
G-AOVD	Winkton, England	24 December 1958	Bristol Britannia 312	None	CFIT, pilot error
G-APFN	Heathrow Airport	24 December 1960	Boeing 707-436	Chicago–London	Pilot error, runway overrun
Flight 911	Mount Fuji, Japan	5 March 1966	Boeing 707-436	San Francisco–Honolulu–Tokyo–Hong Kong–London	Clear-air turbulence, in-flight breakup
Flight 712; Whisky Echo	Heathrow Airport	8 April 1968	Boeing 707-465	London–Zurich–Tel Aviv–Tehran–Bombay–Singapore–Sydney	Engine failure, in-flight fire
Flight 775	Zarka, Jordan	12 September 1970	Vickers VC10	Bahrain–Beirut	Hijacking
Flight 600	Denver	3 August 1971	Boeing 747	Montreal–London	Bomb threat
G-ASCO	Schiphol Airport	3 March 1974	Vickers VC10	Mumbai–Bahrain–Beirut–London	Hijacking
British South American Airways (BSAA)
Flight designation	Location	Date	Aircraft type	Route	Cause
G-AHEW; Star Leader	near Bathurst (now Banjul), Gambia	7 September 1946	Avro York I	London–Lisbon–Bathurst–Natal–Rio de Janeiro–Montevideo–Buenos Aires	Loss of control for reasons unknown, possible pilot error
G-AHEZ	Yoff Airport	13 April 1947	Avro York I	London–Lisbon–Dakar–Natal–Rio de Janeiro	Pilot error
Flight CS59; Star Dust	Tupungato Mountain	2 August 1947	Avro Lancastrian 3	Buenos Aires–Santiago	Weather, CFIT
G-AHNP; Star Tiger	Atlantic Ocean	30 January 1948	Avro Tudor I	London–Lisbon–Horta–Hamilton–Havana	Unexplained disappearance
G-AHEX	Caravelas Bay, Brazil	5 January 1949	Avro York I	London–Lisbon–Bathurst–Natal–Rio de Janeiro–Santiago de Chile	Tire failure, in-flight fire
Flight BSS401; Star Ariel	Sargasso Sea	17 January 1949	Avro Tudor 4B	London–Horta–Hamilton–Kingston	Unexplained disappearance
British United Airways
Flight designation	Location	Date	Aircraft type	Route	Cause
Flight 1030X	Jersey, Channel Islands	14 April 1965	Douglas C-47B	Paris–Jersey	Poor visibility, pilot error

== C ==
CAAC Airlines
Flight designation	Location	Date	Aircraft type	Route	Cause
632	44 mi from Xi'an	5 April 1958	Ilyushin Il-14	Chengdu–Beijing	Loss of control, CFIT
18188	Qinglongshan, Henan Province	26 September 1961	Shijiazhuang Y-5		CFIT
644	near Guiyang	14 January 1973	Ilyushin Il-14		CFIT
B-492	near Shanghai	21 January 1976	Antonov An-24	Guangzhou–Changsha–Hangzhou–Shanghai	Crash on approach
B-484	Changsha	20 March 1980	Antonov An-24RV	Kunming–Guiyang–Changsha	Pilot error, CFIT
Flight 3303	near Yangshuo	26 April 1982	Hawker-Siddeley Trident 2E	Guangzhou–Guilin	CFIT
Flight 2311	Guangzhou Baiyun Int'l Airport	24 December 1982	Ilyushin Il-18B	Lanzhou–Xi'an–Changsha–Guangzhou	In-flight fire
Flight 296	Chuncheon, South Korea	5 May 1983	Hawker-Siddeley Trident 2E	Shenyang–Shanghai	Hijacking
B-264	Guilin Airport	14 September 1983	Hawker-Siddeley Trident 2E	Guilin–Beijing	Ground collision with a PLAAF Harbin H-5
Flight 5109	Jinan	18 January 1985	Antonov An-24B	Shanghai–Nanking–Jinan–Beijing	CFIT
B-3413	near Lanzhou	15 December 1986	Antonov An-24RV	Lanzhou–Xi'an–Chengdu	Engine failure, icing, CFIT
B-2514	Fuzhou Airport	16 June 1987	Boeing 737-2T4	Hong Kong–Fuzhou	Collision with a PLAAF Shenyang J-6
Caledonian Airways
Flight designation	Location	Date	Aircraft type	Route	Cause
Flight 153	Douala, Cameroon	4 March 1962	Douglas DC-7C	Douala–Lisbon	Undetermined
Cambrian Airways
Flight designation	Location	Date	Aircraft type	Route	Cause
G-AMOL	Liverpool	20 July 1965	Vickers Viscount 701	Isle of Man–Liverpool	Loss of control for reasons unknown
G-AMOA	Bristol Airport	19 January 1970	Vickers Viscount 701		Hard landing
Canadian Pacific Air Lines (CP Air)
Flight designation	Location	Date	Aircraft type	Route	Cause
CF-CPD	Mount William Knight	20 December 1942	Lockheed L14H-2 Super Electra	Prince George–Vancouver	CFIT
Flight 108	Quebec	9 September 1949	Douglas C-47	Montreal–Comeau Bay	Bombing
CF-CPR; Empress of Vancouver	Tokyo Bay off Haneda Airport	9 February 1950	Canadair C-4 North Star	Vancouver–Tokyo	Runway overrun
Flight 4	16 mi N of Penticton	22 December 1950	Douglas C-47A	Vancouver–Penticton	Pilot error, CFIT
CF-CPC	Alaska	21 July 1951	Douglas DC-4	Vancouver–Anchorage–Tokyo	Unexplained disappearance
CF-CUN; Empress of Hawaii	Karachi Int'l Airport	3 March 1953	de Havilland Comet 1A	London–Rome–Beirut–Karachi–Yangon–Jakarta–Darwin–Sydney	Pilot error, stall, loss of control
CF-CRV	Prince Rupert, British Columbia	11 May 1953	Boeing-Canada Canso A	Sandspit–Prince Rupert	Pilot error, crash on landing
Flight 307; Empress of Mexico City	Cold Bay, Alaska	29 August 1956	Douglas DC-6B	Vancouver–Cold Bay–Tokyo–Hong Kong	Pilot error
Flight 301; Empress of Lima	Honolulu Int'l Airport	22 July 1962	Bristol Britannia 314	Vancouver–Honolulu–Nadi–Auckland–Sydney	Engine failure, pilot error, loss of control
Flight 21; Empress of City of Buenos Aires	20 mi W of 100 Mile House, British Columbia	8 July 1965	Douglas DC-6B	Vancouver–Prince George–Fort St. John–Fort Nelson–Watson Lake–Whitehorse	Bombing
Flight 402; Empress of Edmonton	Haneda Airport	4 March 1966	Douglas DC-8-43	Hong Kong–Tokyo–Vancouver	Weather, pilot error
Flight 322	Vancouver Int'l Airport	7 February 1968	Boeing 707-138B	Honolulu–Vancouver	Poor visibility, weather, runway overrun
Capital Airlines
Flight designation	Location	Date	Aircraft type	Route	Cause
Flight 19	over Milwaukee	7 August 1949	Douglas C-53D	Muskegon–Milwaukee	Mid-air collision with a private Cessna 140
Flight 500	Potomac River near Washington National Airport	12 December 1949	Douglas DC-3-313A	Memphis–Norfolk–Newport News–Washington DC	Stall, loss of control
Flight 141	Midway International Airport	20 February 1956	Vickers Viscount 744	Detroit–Chicago	Mechanical failure
Flight H-3	near Clarksburg, Maryland	22 June 1957	Douglas C-47A	None	Loss of control
Flight 67	Saginaw Bay off Freeland, Michigan	6 April 1958	Vickers Viscount 745D	Flint–Freeland	Icing, stall, loss of control
Flight 300	over Brunswick, Maryland	20 May 1958	Vickers Viscount 745D	Pittsburgh–Baltimore	Mid-air collision with an Air National Guard T-33A
Flight 3	Martinsburg Airport	4 June 1958	Douglas C-53B	Washington, D.C.–Martinsburg	Stall, loss of control
Flight 75	Chase, Maryland	12 May 1959	Vickers Viscount 745D	New York City–Atlanta	Loss of control, in-flight breakup
Flight 983	Charleston, West Virginia	12 May 1959	Lockheed L-049 Constellation	Pittsburg–Charleston	Slid off runway
Flight 20	Holdcroft, Virginia	18 January 1960	Vickers Viscount 745D	Washington, DC–Norfolk	Icing, triple engine failure, loss of control
Capitol Air
Flight designation	Location	Date	Aircraft type	Route	Cause
N1301N	23 mi west of Fort Collins	16 November 1958	Curtiss C-46F	Denver-Hill AFB	Weather, engine failure, CFIT
N1300N	Plain City, Utah	15 October 1960	Curtiss C-46F	Rapid City-Hill AFB	Metal fatigue, wing separation, loss of control
N1308V	near Katy, Texas	22 January 1961	Curtiss C-46F	San Antonio-Mobile	Engine failure, in-flight fire, wing separation
Flight 3/26	Anchorage Int'l Airport	27 November 1970	Douglas DC-8-63CF	McChord AFB-Anchorage-Yokota AFB-Cam Ranh Bay	Unexplained brake problems, failure to take off, runway overrun
Caproni
Flight designation	Location	Date	Aircraft type	Route	Cause
Unknown	Verona, Italy	2 August 1919	Caproni Ca.48	Venice–Taliedo	Possible structural failure
Caspian Airlines
Flight designation	Location	Date	Aircraft type	Route	Cause
Flight 7908	near Qazvin	15 July 2009	Tupolev Tu-154M	Tehran–Yerevan	Uncontained engine failure, loss of control
Flight 6936	Mahshahr Airport	27 January 2020	McDonnell Douglas MD-83	Tehran–Mahshahr	Pilot error, runway overrun
Cathay Pacific
Flight designation	Location	Date	Aircraft type	Route	Cause
VR-HDT; Miss Macao	Pearl River Delta	16 July 1948	Consolidated PBY-5A Catalina	Macau–Hong Kong	Hijacking
VR-HDG	North Point	24 February 1949	Douglas C-47A	Manila–Hong Kong	CFIT
VR-HDW	Anisakan Airport	13 September 1949	Douglas C-47A	Pyin Oo Lwin–Hong Kong	Landing gear collapse, crash on takeoff
VR-HEU	off Hainan Island	23 July 1954	Douglas C-54A	Bangkok–Hong Kong	Shot down
Flight 033	Kai Tak Airport	5 November 1967	Convair 880-22M-3	Hong Kong–Saigon	Loss of control, runway overrun
Flight 700Z	34 mi SE of Pleiku	15 June 1972	Convair 880-22M-21	Bangkok–Hong Kong	Bombing
Flight 252	near Hong Kong Int'l Airport	30 August 2004	Boeing 747-467	London–Hong Kong	Loss of control
Flight 780	Hong Kong Int'l Airport	13 April 2010	Airbus A330-342	Surabaya–Hong Kong	Fuel contamination, engine failure
Cebu Pacific
Flight designation	Location	Date	Aircraft type	Route	Cause
Flight 387	Misamis Oriental	2 February 1998	Douglas DC-9-32	Manila–Cagayan de Oro	Pilot error
Chalk's Ocean Airways
Flight designation	Location	Date	Aircraft type	Route	Cause
Flight 101	Miami	19 December 2005	Grumman Turbo Mallard	Miami–Bimini	Structural failure
Chicago and Southern Air Lines
Flight designation	Location	Date	Aircraft type	Route	Cause
Flight 4 City of Memphis	St. Louis	5 August 1936	Lockheed Model 10 Electra	New Orleans–Jackson–Memphis–St. Louis–Chicago	Pilot error, CFIT
China Airlines
Flight designation	Location	Date	Aircraft type	Route	Cause
B-1523	South China Sea	23 August 1967	Douglas DC-3	Taipei–Saigon	CFIT
Flight 227	Mount Paku	2 January 1969	Douglas C-47A	Kaohsiung–Taitung–Hualien–Taitung–Kaohsiung	Windshear, loss of altitude
Flight 206	Taipei	12 August 1970	NAMC YS-11A-219	Hualien–Taipei	CFIT
Flight 825	near Penghu Island	21 November 1971	Sud Aviation Caravelle III	Taipei–Hong Kong	Unexplained bombing
Flight 811	Manila Int'l Airport	27 February 1980	Boeing 707-309C	Taipei–Manila	Crashed short of runway
Flight 006	San Francisco	19 February 1985	Boeing 747SP-09	Taipei–Los Angeles	Engine failure, aircraft upset
Flight 2265	off Magong Airport	16 February 1986	Boeing 737-281	Taipei–Magong	CFIT during go-around
Flight 334	Guangzhou	3 May 1986	Boeing 747-2R7F	Singapore–Bangkok–Hong Kong–Taipei	Hijacking
Flight 204	Hualien City	26 October 1989	Boeing 737-209	Hualien–Taipei	Pilot error, crew error, CFIT
Flight 358	near Wanli	29 December 1991	Boeing 747-2R7F	Taipei–Anchorage	Metal fatigue, double engine separation, CFIT
Flight 605	Hong Kong	4 November 1993	Boeing 747-409	Taipei–Hong Kong	Weather, pilot error, runway overrun
Flight 140	Nagoya	26 April 1994	Airbus A300B4-622R	Taipei–Nagoya	Pilot error, stall, loss of control
Flight 676	Taoyuan City	16 February 1998	Airbus A300B4-622R	Bali–Taipei	Weather, pilot error
Flight 642 (operated by Mandarin Airlines)	Hong Kong	22 August 1999	McDonnell Douglas MD-11	Bangkok–Hong Kong	Weather, hard landing
Flight 611	Taiwan Strait	25 May 2002	Boeing 747-209B	Taipei–Hong Kong	Improper maintenance, metal fatigue, in-flight breakup
Flight 120	Okinawa, Japan	20 August 2007	Boeing 737-809	Taipei–Naha	Engine fire on landing
China Eastern Airlines
Flight designation	Location	Date	Aircraft type	Route	Cause
Unknown	Fuzhou Airport	24 April 1989	Xian Y-7	Ningbo–Xiamen	Hijacking
Flight 5510	near Shanghai	15 August 1989	Antonov An-24RV	Lanyungang–Shanghai–Nanchang	Engine failure for reasons unknown
Flight 583	Shemya	6 April 1993	McDonnell Douglas MD-11	Shanghai–Los Angeles	Loss of control
Flight 5398	Fuzhou Airport	26 October 1993	McDonnell Douglas MD-82	Shenzhen–Fuzhou	Runway overrun, pilot error
Flight 586	Shanghai	11 September 1998	McDonnell Douglas MD-11	Shanghai–Beijing	Nosegear failure
Flight 5210	Baotou	21 November 2004	Bombardier CRJ-200LR	Baotou–Shanghai	Icing, crew error
Flight 2947	Hongqiao Airport	7 June 2013	Embraer ERJ-145LI	Huai'an–Shanghai	Nosegear malfunction, runway excursion on landing
Flight 5735	Shentangbiao, Teng County	21 March 2022	Boeing 737-89P	Kunming-Guangzhou	Under investigation (possible deliberate crash)
China Flying Dragon Aviation
Flight designation	Location	Date	Aircraft type	Route	Cause
B-3822	Changhai	21 June 1996	Harbin Y-12-II	Dalian–Shanghai	Crew error, CFIT
B-3841	near Chifeng	15 June 2008	Harbin Y-12-II		CFIT
China General Aviation
Flight designation	Location	Date	Aircraft type	Route	Cause
Flight 7552	Nanking Airport	31 July 1992	Yakovlev Yak-42D	Nanking–Xiamen	Loss of control
China National Aviation Corporation (CNAC)
Flight designation	Location	Date	Aircraft type	Route	Cause
NC16930; Chekiang	Chilang Point	8 August 1937	Sikorsky S-43W	Hong Kong–Shanghai	Weather, water ditching
32; Kweilin	Wangmoon	24 August 1938	Douglas DC-2-221	Hong Kong–Wuchow–Chungking–Chengtu	Attacked by Japanese fighters, forced landing
39; Chungking	near Changyi	29 October 1940	Douglas DC-2-221	Chongqing–Kunming	Attacked and destroyed on the ground by Japanese fighters
23	Jiangxi Province	20 January 1941	Ford 5-AT-D Trimotor		Weather, CFIT
40; Kangting	Taohsien, Hunan	12 February 1941	Douglas DC-2-190	Hong Kong–Chongqing	Weather, CFIT
31; Chungshan	near Kunming Airport	14 March 1942	Douglas DC-2-221	Kunming–Chongqing	Overloading, engine failure, crash on takeoff
60	Yunnan Province	17 November 1942	Douglas C-47	Kunming–Dinjan	Unexplained disappearance
53	near Luishui	11 March 1943	Douglas C-53	Kunming–Assam	CFIT
49	Himalayas	13 March 1943	Douglas C-53	Kunming–Dinjan	Unexplained disappearance
58 / 42-15890	30 mi NE of Minzong	7 April 1943	Douglas C-53	Dinjan–Kunming	Icing, weather, CFIT
48	Fort Hertz valley	11 August 1943	Douglas C-53	Dinjan–Kunming	Shot down
72	Sumprabum	13 October 1943	Douglas C-47	Kunming–Dinjan	Shot down
59	Kunming	19 November 1943	Douglas C-53		Weather, poor visibility, crashed short of runway
63	Kunming	19 November 1943	Douglas C-47		Weather, poor visibility, pilot error, CFIT
83	near Suifu	18 December 1943	Douglas C-47A	Dinjan–Suifu	ATC error, pilot error, poor visibility, CFIT
75	near Paoshan	20 February 1944	Douglas C-47A	Dinjan–Kunming	Weather, CFIT
90	Patkai Range	15 May 1944	Douglas C-47A	Dinjan–Kunming	Turbulence, CFIT
82	Himalayas	26 May 1944	Douglas C-47A	Calcutta–Dinjan	Weather, CFIT
85	over Dinjan	8 June 1944	Douglas C-47A	Kunming–Dinjan	Improper maintenance, in-flight explosion, in-flight breakup
71	near Kweilin	18 June 1944	Douglas C-47	Kunming–Chongqing	Fuel exhaustion, CFIT
73	Baldy Mountain	1 August 1944	Douglas C-47		Crew error, CFIT
97	near Shimbuyang	31 August 1944	Douglas C-47A		Loss of power
101	20 mi W of Sadiya, Assam	7 October 1944	Douglas C-47B	Dinjan–Suifu	Weather, spatial disorientation, wing separation
56	Digboi Mountain	30 November 1944	Douglas C-53	Dinjan–Kunming	Possible contaminated fuel, loss of power
104	13 mi N of Suichang	20 October 1945	Douglas DC-3C	Shanghai–Hong Kong	CFIT
140	Hongqiao Airport	25 December 1946	Douglas C-47	Chongqing–Shanghai	Poor visibility
115	Hongqiao Airport	25 December 1946	Curtiss C-46	Chongqing–Shanghai	Poor visibility
XT-T51 / 121	W of Qingdao	5 January 1947	Curtiss C-46	Shanghai–Qingdao–Beijing	CFIT
138	119 mi S of Chongqing	25 January 1947	Douglas DC-3	Guangzhou–Chongqing	CFIT
XT-104	Basalt Island	21 December 1948	Douglas C-54B	Shanghai–Hong Kong	CFIT
China Northern Airlines
Flight designation	Location	Date	Aircraft type	Route	Cause
Flight 6901	near Ürümqi	13 November 1993	McDonnell Douglas MD-82	Beijing–Ürümqi	Pilot error, CFIT
Flight 6136	Bohai Bay near Dalian	7 May 2002	McDonnell Douglas MD-82	Beijing–Dalian	In-flight fire (arson), loss of control
China Northwest Airlines
Flight designation	Location	Date	Aircraft type	Route	Cause
Flight 2119	Yinchuan Xihuayuan Airport	23 July 1993	BAe 146–300	Yinchuan–Beijing	Mechanical failure, aborted takeoff, runway overrun
Flight 2303	near Xi'an	6 June 1994	Tupolev Tu-154M	Xian–Guangzhou	Improper maintenance, mechanical failure, loss of control
China Southern Airlines
Flight designation	Location	Date	Aircraft type	Route	Cause
Flight 301	Kowloon Bay	31 August 1988	Hawker-Siddeley Trident 2E	Guangzhou–Hong Kong	Runway excursion on landing for reasons unknown; possible windshear
Flight 3523	Guangzhou Baiyun International Airport	2 October 1990	Boeing 757-21B	Guangzhou–Shanghai	Ground collision with hijacked Xiamen Airlines Boeing 737
Flight 3943	near Guilin Airport	24 November 1992	Boeing 737-3Y0	Guangzhou–Guilin	Pilot error, loss of control
Flight 3456	Shenzhen Airport	8 May 1997	Boeing 737-31B	Chongqing–Shenzhen	Weather, pilot error, runway excursion
China Southwest Airlines
Flight designation	Location	Date	Aircraft type	Route	Cause
Flight 4146	32 mi SW of Chongqing Airport	18 January 1988	Ilyushin Il-18D	Beijing–Chongqing	Engine fire, engine separation, loss of control
Flight 4305	Guangzhou Baiyun International Airport	2 October 1990	Boeing 707-3J6B	Chengdu–Guangzhou	Sideswiped by hijacked Xiamen Airlines Boeing 737
Flight 4509	Rui'an	24 February 1999	Tupolev Tu-154M	Chengdu–Wenzhou	Improper maintenance, loss of control
Chosonminhang (now Air Koryo)
Flight designation	Location	Date	Aircraft type	Route	Cause
P-889	Fouta Djallon near Labé, Guinea	1 July 1983	Ilyushin Il-62M	Pyongyang–Conakry	CFIT
Civil Air Transport (CAT)
Flight designation	Location	Date	Aircraft type	Route	Cause
XT-822	Qingdao Airport	29 July 1948	Curtiss C-46D	Qingdao–Jinan	Entered a spin on takeoff
XT-820	near Lanzhou	9 December 1949	Curtiss C-46D	Lanzhou–Hong Kong	Loss of control on climbout
N8342C	off Basalt Island	21 December 1948	Douglas C-54B	Shanghai–Hong Kong	CFIT
XT-814	near Haikou	10 December 1949	Curtiss C-46D	Chengdu–Haikou	Crash on approach
49-0919	near Ban Sot, Laos	6 May 1954	Fairchild C-119C Flying Boxcar	None	Shot down
B-811	off Hua Hin	20 October 1954	Douglas C-47A		Pilot error, CFIT
Flight 106	near Shenkang, Taiwan	20 June 1964	Curtiss C-46D	Taichung–Taipei	Engine failure, loss of control
Flight 010; Super Cuihua	near Taipei	16 February 1968	Boeing 727-92C	Hong Kong–Taipei	Pilot error
Colgan Air
Flight designation	Location	Date	Aircraft type	Route	Cause
Flight 3407 (operating as Continental Connection)	Clarence Center, New York	12 February 2009	Bombardier Dash-8 Q400	Newark–Buffalo	Pilot error, stall
Compagnie des Grands Express Aériens (CGEA)
Flight designation	Location	Date	Aircraft type	Route	Cause
F-GEAD	over Picardy	7 April 1922	Farman F.60	Le Bourget–Croydon	Mid-air collision
Compagnie des Messageries Aériennes (CMA)
Flight designation	Location	Date	Aircraft type	Route	Cause
F-AEIE	Croydon Airport	15 March 1923	Farman F.60		Runway overrun
Comair
Flight designation	Location	Date	Aircraft type	Route	Cause
Flight 3272	Monroe, Michigan	9 January 1997	Embraer 120 RT Brasilia		Weather, crew error
Flight 5191	Lexington, Kentucky	27 August 2006	Bombardier CRJ-100ER		ATC, pilot errors
Condor
Flight designation	Location	Date	Aircraft type	Route	Cause
Flight 3782	near Seferihisar	2 January 1988	Boeing 737-230	Stuttgart–İzmir	Navigation error
Continental Airlines
Flight designation	Location	Date	Aircraft type	Route	Cause
NC25636	Albuquerque	27 August 1945	Lockheed 18-01-01 Lodestar		Burned out
Flight 46	near Midland, Texas	16 March 1954	Convair CV-340-35	Midland–Kansas City	Improper maintenance
Flight 114	over Hobbs, New Mexico	29 August 1955	Douglas DC-3-191A	Carlsbad–Hobbs	Mid-air collision with a Piper PA-22
Flight 190	over Bartlesville, Oklahoma	9 September 1956	Douglas DC-3A-453	Tulsa–Bartlesville	Mid-air collision with a Cessna 170B
Flight 54	Unknown	3 August 1961	Boeing 707-124	Los Angeles–Houston	Hijacking
Flight 11	near Unionville, Missouri	22 May 1962	Boeing 707-124	Chicago–Kansas City	Bombing
Flight 210	Amarillo Air Terminal	8 July 1962	Vickers Viscount 812	Amarillo–Lubbock	Pilot error
Flight 290	Kansas City Downtown Airport	29 January 1963	Vickers Viscount 812	Midland–Kansas City	Icing, loss of control
Flight 12	Kansas City Downtown Airport	1 July 1965	Boeing 707-124	Los Angeles–Kansas City	Skidded off runway
N17325	over Gunnison, Colorado	19 November 1968	Boeing 707-324C	Los Angeles–Denver	Bombing, in-flight fire
Flight 144	Tulsa International Airport	19 December 1970	Douglas DC-9	Albuquerque–Denver–Wichita–Tulsa	Hijacking
Flight 712	over Compton, California	4 August 1971	Boeing 707-324C	Hilo–Los Angeles	Mid-air collision with a Cessna 150J
Flight 426	Stapleton International Airport	7 August 1975	Boeing 727-224	Denver–Wichita	Windshear
Flight 603	Los Angeles International Airport	1 March 1978	McDonnell Douglas DC-10-10	Los Angeles–Honolulu	Tire failure, aborted takeoff
Flight 1713	Denver	15 November 1987	Douglas DC-9-14	Denver–Boise	Pilot error, weather
N433PE	Cleveland Hopkins International Airport	17 April 1988	Boeing 737-217	Newark–Cleveland	In-flight fire
Flight 795	New York City	2 March 1994	McDonnell Douglas MD-82	New York City–Denver	Runway overrun
Flight 1943	Houston Intercontinental Airport	19 February 1996	Douglas DC-9-32	Washington, DC–Houston	Pilot error
Flight 1883	Newark Liberty International Airport	28 October 2006	Boeing 757-224	Orlando–Newark	Pilot error, landed on taxiway
Flight 1404	Denver International Airport	20 December 2008	Boeing 737-524	Denver–Houston	Pilot error, ATC error
Continental Express
Flight designation	Location	Date	Aircraft type	Route	Cause
Flight 2574 (operated by Britt Airways)	Eagle Lake, Texas	11 September 1991	Embraer EMB-120RT Brasilia	Laredo–Houston	Improper maintenance, structural failure
Court Line
Flight designation	Location	Date	Aircraft type	Route	Cause
Flight 95	London Luton Airport	18 April 1974	BAC 1-11-518FG	London–Munich	Runway collision with a Piper Aztec
ČSA Czech Airlines
Flight designation	Location	Date	Aircraft type	Route	Cause
OK-FOR	Jihlava	22 August 1930	Ford 5-AT-C Trimotor	Prague–Brno–Bratislava	CFIT
OK-BAG	Oberkirch	13 August 1938	Savoia-Marchetti S.73	Prague–Strasbourg–Paris	CFIT
OK-ZDN	near Prague	5 March 1946	Junkers Ju 52/3m	Paris–Strasbourg–Prague	Crashed on landing
OK-WDB	Croydon Airport	25 January 1947	Douglas C-47A		Struck by Spencer Airways C-47
OK-XDU	near Kladno	13 February 1947	Douglas C-47A	Prague–Cakovice	Possible improper maintenance
Flight 584	near Pylos	21 December 1948	Douglas C-47A	Prague–Rome–Athens–Lydda	Spatial disorientation, shot down
OK-WDY	Praded Mountain	27 February 1950	Douglas C-47A	Ostrava–Prague	CFIT
OK-WAB	Košice	29 July 1950	Douglas DC-3C		In-flight fire
OK-WDS	near Prague Ruzyně Airport	12 January 1954	Douglas C-47A	Prague–Ostrava	Failed to take off
OK-WDK	near Ivanka Airport	12 December 1954	Douglas C-47A	Prague–Brno–Bratislava	Blocked pitot tubes, pilot error, CFIT
OK-WDZ	Mount Skapova	18 January 1956	Douglas C-47A	Prague–Bratislava–Košice	Weather, CFIT
Flight 548	Eglisau	24 November 1956	Ilyushin Il-12B	Zurich–Prague	Loss of control for reasons unknown
OK-MCZ	Hostivice	2 January 1961	Avia 14-32A	None	Failed to take off
Flight 511	14 mi NE of Nürnberg	28 March 1961	Ilyushin Il-18V	Prague–Zurich–Rabat–Dakar–Conakry	In-flight breakup for reasons unknown
Flight 511	near Casablanca	12 July 1961	Ilyushin Il-18V	Prague–Zurich–Rabat–Dakar–Conakry	CFIT for reasons unknown
Flight 306	near Slavkov	10 October 1962	Avia 14-32A	Bratislava–Brno	Pilot error, CFIT
Flight 523	near Gander, Newfoundland	5 September 1967	Ilyushin Il-18D	Prague–Shannon–Gander–Havana	Undetermined
OK-MCJ; Svit Gottwaldov	Ptice	11 October 1968	Avia 14-32A	Prague–Kosice	Engine failure for reasons unknown, poor CRM
OK-NDD; Plzen	near Tripoli International Airport	1 June 1970	Tupolev Tu-104A	Prague–Tripoli	Crashed short of runway
Flight 744; Centrotex	Kloten Airport	18 August 1970	Tupolev Tu-124V	Prague–Zurich	Crew preoccupation, belly landing
Flight 540; Brno Trade Fair	11 mi NE of Damascus	20 August 1975	Ilyushin Il-62	Prague–Damascus–Baghdad–Tehran	Incorrect altimeter setting
Flight 001; Košice	Bratislava	28 July 1976	Ilyushin Il-18V	Prague–Bratislava	Engine failure, pilot error, loss of control
OK-OCA	near Bratislava	11 February 1977	Avia 14-32T	Prague–Bratislava	Pilot error
OK-KFM	Prague Ruzyně Airport	9 June 2012	ATR 42-500	None	Burned in hangar fire
Curtiss Reid Flying Services
Flight designation	Location	Date	Aircraft type	Route	Cause
CF-EDN	near Grenoble	13 November 1950	Douglas C-54B	Rome–Paris–Shannon–Keflavik–Montreal	Deviation from course, CFIT
Cubana de Aviación
Cyprus Airways
Flight designation	Location	Date	Aircraft type	Route	Cause
Flight 226 (operated by BEA)	Esenboğa Airport	21 December 1961	de Havilland Comet 4B	London–Rome–Athens–Istanbul–Ankara–Nicosia–Tel Aviv	Instrument failure, pilot error, stall, loss of control
Flight 284 (operated by BEA)	Mediterranean Sea	12 October 1967	de Havilland Comet 4	London-Athens–Nicosia–Cairo	Bombing

== See also ==
- Lists of disasters
