= 1926 Air Union Blériot 155 crash =

The 1926 Air Union Bleriot 155 crash may refer to the crash of either of two Air Union Blériot 155 aircraft, both of which crashed in 1926:

- F-AIEB in the August 1926 Air Union Blériot 155 crash, on 18 August 1926 near Lympne Airport
- F-AICQ in the October 1926 Air Union Blériot 155 crash, on 2 October 1926 near Penshurst Airfield
