= Engine failure on takeoff =

Aircraft situation

Engine failure on takeoff (EFTO) is a situation, when flying an aircraft, where an engine has failed, or is not delivering sufficient power, at any time between brake release and the wheels leaving the ground.

In small airplanes, if the engine failure occurs before V_{R} (Rotation Speed), the pilot should reduce throttles to idle, deploy speed brakes (if equipped), and brake as necessary. If the engine failure occurs just after liftoff, the pilot must make a decision if there is enough runway to achieve an emergency runway landing, or if an off field landing is required. One of the biggest mistakes a pilot can make is attempting to turn around and return to the airport for an emergency landing. If altitude permits, this could be an option (i.e. if at or above 1,000 feet AGL) but most pilots are trained to avoid the obvious tendency to turn around and instead land the plane straight forward.

Common first steps after an EFTO would be to fly at the best glide speed (V_{BG}), retract flaps if airspeed permits, unlatch the door, and land straight ahead. Returning to the airport with a steep turn has a high probability of resulting in a stall or spin. Although it seems counterintuitive, the NTSB has recorded numerous fatal crashes due to this mistake.

In large airplanes e.g. commercial airliners, before the takeoff is commenced, the highest speed from which a safe stop can be achieved on the remaining runway is calculated. This speed is called V_{1}. If the pilot has not initiated a stop when accelerating through V_{1} during the takeoff run, the takeoff generally must continue even in the event of a single engine failure. The takeoff weight will have been limited to ensure it is safe to continue takeoff with one engine inoperative after having accelerated to V_{1} with all engines operating.
