= August 1926 Air Union Blériot 155 crash =

Aircraft accident in the United Kingdom

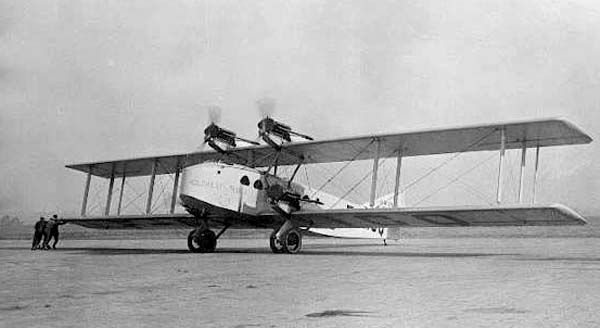
- Blériot 155 F-AICQ Clement Ader, similar to the accident aircraft. This aircraft later crashed as Air Union Blériot 155 on October

Accident
- Date: 18 August 1926
- Summary: Crashed on landing
- Site: College Farm, Hurst, Aldington, Kent; 51°03′30″N 0°57′16″E TR 071 329

Aircraft
- Aircraft type: Blériot 155
- Aircraft name: Wilbur Wright
- Operator: Air Union
- Registration: F-AIEB
- Flight origin: Le Bourget Airport, Paris, France
- Destination: Croydon Airport, Croydon, United Kingdom
- Passengers: 13
- Crew: 2
- Fatalities: 3
- Injuries: 12
- Survivors: 12

The August 1926 Air Union Blériot 155 crash happened on 18 August 1926 at Hurst, Kent when Blériot 155 F-AIEB of Air Union hit a barn and crashed whilst attempting to make a forced landing in bad weather. Two passengers were killed in the accident, and the pilot, a Mr. Delisle, died a day later.

== Aircraft ==
The accident aircraft was Blériot 155 registration F-AIEB Wilbur Wright, c/n 2. The aircraft had been registered to Air Union on 27 June 1926, and had flown for 47¼ hours at the time of the accident.

== Accident ==
On 18 August 1926, the aircraft departed Le Bourget Airport, Paris at 12:30 pm local time (11:30 GMT), bound for Croydon Airport. On board were the pilot and his mechanic, and 13 passengers. At 1:56 pm GMT, a radio report was made to Saint-Inglevert that the aircraft was crossing the coast at Berck-Plage. The crossing of the English Channel was made in conditions of poor visibility, with heavy drizzle. Reported weather conditions at Lympne at 1:15 pm GMT were continuous rain and fog, visibility 500 yards (460 m), cloudbase less than 150 feet (46 m). Visibility had halved in the preceding 20 minutes. It was reported that an engine failed as the aircraft crossed the English coast. At 2:30 pm GMT, the pilot attempted to make a forced landing in a large field at College Farm, Hurst, Aldington, some 5 miles (8.0 km) west of Lympne Airport. The aircraft clipped the roof of a barn and then hit three stacks before crashing to the ground. The farmer and two farmhands were missed by 10 feet (3.0 m). Two of the 13 passengers were killed in the crash. Both crew and the other eleven passengers were injured. The pilot was seriously injured, and died in hospital on 19 August.

The farmer and farmhands rescued the injured people from the wrecked aircraft. Two of the passengers were able to extricate themselves from the wreckage but the other 11 passengers were more seriously injured. They had been thrown forwards in the accident, one woman had been forced through the side of the fuselage. The local doctor attended and assisted in the evacuation of the injured from the scene. Hurdles were improvised as makeshift stretchers and the injured were taken into the barn until ambulances arrived from Ashford, Hythe and Lympne. They were taken to hospital in Folkestone. Many of the injured suffered multiple fractures.

An inquest into the deaths of the passengers was held at College Farm on 19 August. Evidence was given that the aircraft had been inspected before the flight, and a certificate that it was fit to fly had been issued by Bureau Veritas. The aircraft was capable of flying on three engines. The cause of death of both passengers was ruptures to their lungs. A verdict of Accidental death was given in both cases. The inquest into the death of the pilot was held on 26 August in Folkestone. Evidence given at the inquest into the deaths of the passengers showed that the pilot was experienced, having started his flying career with the French Army during the First World War. He had been employed by Air Union for three years. A verdict of accidental death was returned.

== Casualties ==
Nationality	Crew	Passengers	Killed	Injured
(United States) American	–	8	1	7
(England) English	–	4	–	4
(France) French	2	–	1	1
(Italy) Italian	–	1	1	–
Total	2	13	3	12

== See also ==
- October 1926 Air Union Blériot 155 crash
