= Blériot 155 =

155
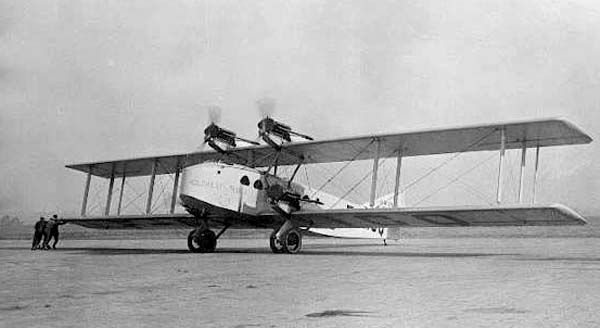
- F-AICQ Clement Ader

General information
- Type: Airliner
- Manufacturer: Blériot
- Status: Both destroyed
- Primary user: Air Union
- Number built: 2

History
- Manufactured: 1925-26
- First flight: 29 July 1925
- Retired: 2 October 1926

The Blériot 155 (or Bl-155) was a French airliner of the 1920s. It was a four-engined biplane developed from the Blériot 115 and 135, but larger than these aircraft. Two were built for use by Air Union on their Paris-London route. Both were lost in accidents in 1926.

== Records ==
In 1926, Robert Bajac piloted one of the 155s to break the world absolute aerial duration records for powered aircraft. On 26 March, he stayed aloft 3 hours 46 minutes 35 seconds with a 1,500 kg payload aboard, thereby not only breaking the record for this weight payload, but also the record for 1,000 kg payload. On 24 July, he broke the equivalent record in the 2,000 kg payload class.

== Accidents ==
On 18 August 1926, Blériot 155 F-AIEB Wilbur Wright crashed due to engine failure in bad weather at Hurst, Kent, near Lympne Airport. One crewmember and two of the thirteen passengers aboard were killed.

On 2 October 1926, Blériot 155 F-AICQ Clement Ader of Air Union crashed at Leigh, Kent following an in-flight fire, killing all seven people on board. The pilot was trying to make an emergency landing at Penshurst Airfield.

== Variants ==
Blériot 155
Four-engined airliner.
Blériot 113
Projected bomber version. Not built.

== Operators ==
France

- Air Union

== Specifications ==
General characteristics

- Crew: Two pilots and one radio operator
- Capacity: 17 passengers
- Length: 14.75 m (48 ft 5 in)
- Wingspan: 26.00 m (85 ft 3 in)
- Height: 5.23 m (17 ft 2 in)
- Wing area: 135.0 m^{2} (1,452 sq ft)
- Empty weight: 3,650 kg (8,047 lb)
- Gross weight: 6,350 kg (14,000 lb)
- Powerplant: 4 × Renault 8Fg piston engine , 172 kW (230 hp) each

Performance

- Maximum speed: 175 km/h (109 mph, 95 kn)
- Range: 515 km (302 mi, 262 nmi)
- Service ceiling: 4,000 m (13,120 ft)
