= October 1926 Air Union Blériot 155 crash =

Plane crash in Leigh, Kent, England

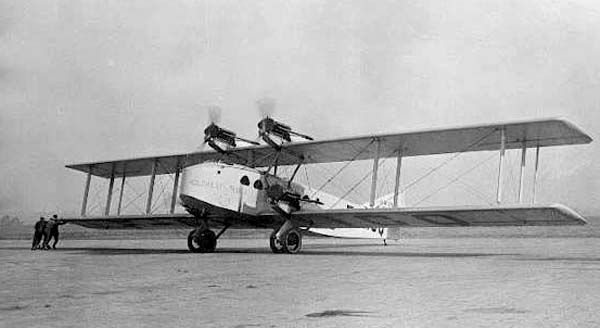
- F-AICQ, the Blériot 155 involved in the accident.

Accident
- Date: 2 October 1926
- Summary: In-flight fire
- Site: Leigh, Kent; 51°13′02″N 0°11′49″E TQ 535 487

Aircraft
- Aircraft type: Blériot 155
- Aircraft name: Clement Ader
- Operator: Air Union
- Registration: F-AICQ
- Flight origin: Le Bourget Airport, Paris, France
- Destination: Croydon Airport, Croydon, United Kingdom
- Occupants: 7
- Passengers: 5
- Crew: 2
- Fatalities: 7
- Survivors: 0

The October 1926 Air Union Blériot 155 crash happened on 2 October 1926 at Leigh, Kent when Blériot 155 F-AICQ caught fire in mid-air and crashed while the pilot attempted to make an emergency landing at Penshurst Airfield. Both crew members and all five passengers were killed. This was the first in-flight fire occurring on an airliner.

== Aircraft ==
The accident aircraft was Blériot 155 registration F-AICQ Clement Ader, c/n 1. The aircraft had been registered to Compagnie Air Union in May 1926. The only other aircraft of this type had crashed two months earlier.

== Accident ==
On 2 October 1926, the aircraft departed Le Bourget Airport, Paris at 1:30 pm local time (12:30 pm GMT) bound for Croydon Airport. On board were the pilot and his mechanic, two male and three female passengers and 1,800 pounds (820 kg) of cargo, consisting of motor spares and furs.

At 3:24 pm GMT, the pilot radioed ahead to Croydon "OK, passing over Tonbridge. All well." At 3:27 pm, eyewitnesses reported seeing the aircraft with the port upper engine on fire. The fire was seen to spread to the wing and the aircraft changed direction, evidently heading for Penshurst Airfield. Eyewitnesses described the tail of the aircraft sinking whilst the aircraft gained a little height. Then the aircraft rolled over and dived to the ground where the wreckage was consumed by fire. The aircraft crashed in the grounds of a house named Southwood, in Leigh, Kent.

Three members of the public and a policeman attempted to rescue the passengers and crew on board the aircraft. One female passenger was pulled from the wreckage but discovered to be dead. The pilot had been thrown clear in the crash and killed. The mechanic and the other four passengers were all killed instantly and trapped in the burning wreckage. During the rescue attempts, a petrol [oil] tank exploded and the wreckage was left to burn itself out.

The victims were removed to the coach-house of Southwood, where a temporary morgue was set up. The smouldering wreckage was guarded overnight by the local police and an official from the Air Ministry arrived the next morning to begin his investigation into the crash. Around 6,000 sightseers came to see the wreckage, their presence causing congestion in the narrow lanes and necessitating the area being cordoned off so that the investigators could carry out their work and also to prevent contamination of the evidence.

The inquest was held on 5 October at The Priory, Hildenborough. Representatives from British national newspapers attended, as well as those from elsewhere. Evidence heard covered two areas; the identity of the victims and the cause of the crash. The jury were informed that they might make any recommendations that they saw fit. A doctor gave evidence that all the victims had suffered multiple fractures, and that death would have occurred within a short time of the accident. The aircraft had been inspected before the flight, and a certificate issued by Bureau Veritas showing that it was fit for flight. The pilot was experienced, with over 2,000 hours flying time, and had been in the employ of Air Union since 1920. He had made 61 return flights between Paris and London. On being questioned, Major Cooper of the Air Ministry stated that there had never been a previous case of an airliner catching fire in the air. The jury returned a verdict of "Accidental death" against all seven victims. The behaviour of the spectators was deplored by both jury and coroner.

== Casualties ==
| Nationality | Crew | Passengers | Total |
|---|---|---|---|
| English | – | 5 | 5 |
| French | 2 | – | 2 |
| Total | 2 | 5 | 7 |

== See also ==
- 1922 Picardie mid-air collision
- August 1926 Air Union Blériot 155 crash
