= Tartagal =

Tartagal may refer to three places in Argentina:

- Tartagal, Chaco
- Tartagal, Salta
- Tartagal, Santa Fe, Vera Department
