= Subachoque (disambiguation) =

Subachoque may refer to:

- Subachoque, a municipality in the department of Cundinamarca, Colombia
  - the deadliest airplane crash location of 1947
- Subachoque Formation, a geological formation outcropping near and named after Subachoque
- Subachoque River, a river in the valley of Subachoque
