= Aircraft hijacking =

Incident involving unlawful seizure of an aircraft in operation

Aircraft hijacking (also known as airplane hijacking, skyjacking, plane hijacking, plane jacking, air robbery, air piracy, or aircraft piracy, with the last term used within the special aircraft jurisdiction of the United States) is the unlawful seizure of an aircraft by an individual or a group. Dating from the earliest of hijackings, most cases involve the pilot being forced to fly according to the hijacker's demands. There have also been incidents where the hijackers have overpowered the flight crew, made unauthorized entry into the cockpit and flown them into buildings—most notably in the September 11 attacks—and in some cases, planes have been hijacked by the official captain or first officer, such as with Ethiopian Airlines Flight 702.

Unlike carjacking or sea piracy, an aircraft hijacking is not usually committed with the intention of robbery or theft. Individuals driven by personal gain often divert planes to destinations where they are not planning to go themselves. Some hijackers intend to use passengers or crew as hostages, either for monetary ransom or for some political or administrative concession by authorities. Various motives have driven such occurrences, such as demanding the release of certain high-profile individuals or for the right of political asylum (notably Ethiopian Airlines Flight 961), but sometimes a hijacking may have been affected by a failed private life or financial distress, as in the case of Aarno Lamminparras in Finnair Flight 405. Hijackings involving hostages have produced violent confrontations between hijackers and the authorities, during negotiation and settlement. In several cases – most famously Air France Flight 139, Lufthansa Flight 181, and Air France Flight 8969 – the hijackers were not satisfied and showed no inclination to surrender, resulting in the deployment of counterterrorist police tactical units or special forces to rescue the passengers.

In most jurisdictions of the world, aircraft hijacking is punishable by life imprisonment or a long prison sentence. In most jurisdictions where the death penalty is a legal punishment, aircraft hijacking is a capital crime, including in China, India, Liberia, and the U.S. states of Georgia and Mississippi.

== History ==
Airplane hijackings have occurred since the early days of flight. These can be classified in the following eras: Pre-1929, 1929–1957, 1958–1979, 1980–2000, and 2001–present. Early incidents involved light planes, but this later involved passenger aircraft as commercial aviation became widespread.

=== Pre-1929 ===
One of the first accounts of an aircraft hijacking dates to 1919, sometime during the short existence of the Hungarian Soviet Republic (21 March – 1 August). Hungarian polymath Baron Franz Nopcsa von Felső-Szilvás was a spy for Austria-Hungary in World War I, whose defeat and dissolution ceded Nopcsa's native Transylvania to Romania. Under the new socialist state government, Nopcsa and Bajazid Elmaz Doda (his secretary and boyfriend) were unable to obtain a passport to leave the country. To circumvent this, Nopcsa forged documents from the Ministry of War that convinced the military commander at the Mátyásföld Airport on the outskirts of Budapest to provide him and Doda with a small airplane and a pilot. Somewhere over Győr, approximately halfway between Budapest and their supposed destination of Sopron, Franz pulled out a revolver, held it to the pilot's head, and demanded to be flown to Vienna (then a part of the also transitionary Republic of German-Austria (12 November 1918 – 10 September 1919)). Nopcsa and Doda successfully arrived in Vienna, where they lived until Nopcsa's murder–suicide of Doda in 1933 after years of depression and financial destitution.

=== 1929–1957 ===
Between 1929 and 1957, there were fewer than 20 incidents of reported hijackings worldwide; several occurred in Eastern Europe.

An early but unconfirmed account of hijacking occurred in December 1929. J. Howard "Doc" DeCelles was flying a postal route for a Mexican firm, Transportes Aeras Transcontinentales, ferrying mail from San Luis Potosí to Torreon and then on to Guadalajara. Saturnino Cedillo, the governor of the state of San Luis Potosí, ordered him to divert. Several other men were also involved, and through an interpreter, DeCelles had no choice but to comply. He was allegedly held captive for several hours under armed guard before being released.

The first recorded aircraft hijack took place on February 21, 1931, in Arequipa, Peru. Byron Richards, flying a Ford Tri-Motor, was approached on the ground by armed revolutionaries. He refused to fly them anywhere during a 10-day standoff. Richards was informed that the revolution was successful and he could be freed in return for flying one of the men to Lima.

The following year, in September 1932, a Sikorsky S-38 with registration P-BDAD, registered to Nyrba do Brasil, was seized in the company's hangar by three men, who took a hostage. Despite having no flying experience, they managed to take off. However, the aircraft crashed in São João de Meriti, killing the four men. Apparently, the hijack was related to the events of the Constitutionalist Revolution in São Paulo; it is considered to be the first hijack that took place in Brazil.

On October 28, 1939, the first murder on a plane took place in Brookfield, Missouri, US. The victim was Carl Bivens, a flight instructor, who was teaching a man named Earnest P. "Larry" Pletch. While airborne in a Taylor Cub monoplane, Pletch shot Bivens twice in the back of the head. Pletch later told prosecutors, "Carl was telling me I had a natural ability and I should follow that line", adding, "I had a revolver in my pocket and without saying a word to him, I took it out of my overalls and I fired a bullet into the back of his head. He never knew what struck him." The Chicago Daily Tribune stated it was one of the most spectacular crimes of the 20th century. Pletch pleaded guilty and was sentenced to life in prison. However, he was released on March 1, 1957, after serving 17 years, and lived until June 2001.

In 1942 near Malta, two New Zealanders, a South African, and an Englishman achieved the first confirmed in-air hijack when they overpowered their captors aboard an Italian seaplane that was flying them to a prisoner-of-war camp. As they approached an Allied base, they were strafed by Supermarine Spitfires unaware of the aircraft's true operators and forced to land on the water. However, all on board survived to be picked up by a British boat.

In the years following World War II, Philip Baum, an aviation security expert, suggested that the development of a rebellious youth "piggybacking on to any cause which challenged the status quo or acted in support of those deemed oppressed" may have been a contributor to attacks against the aviation field. The first hijacking of a commercial flight occurred on the Cathay Pacific Miss Macao on July 16, 1948. After this incident and others in the 1950s, airlines recommended that flight crews comply with the hijackers' demands rather than risk a violent confrontation. There were also various hijacking incidents and assaults on planes in China and the Middle East. The forced landing by the Israeli Air Force of a Syrian Airlines plane in December 1954 has been described by multiple writers as a state-sponsored hijacking.

On 23 July 1956, in the Hungarian People's Republic, seven passengers hijacked a domestic flight of Malév Hungarian Airlines, a Lisunov Li-2 (registration HA-LIG), to escape from behind the Iron Curtain, and flew it to West Germany. The aircraft landed safely at Ingolstadt Air Base without injuries.

An aircraft belonging to the airline Lloyd Aereo Boliviano was hijacked in Bolivia on September 26, 1956. The DC-4 was carrying 47 prisoners who were being transported from Santa Cruz, Bolivia, to El Alto, in La Paz. A political group was waiting to take them to a concentration camp located in Carahuara de Carangas, Oruro. The 47 prisoners overpowered the crew and gained control of the aircraft while airborne and diverted the plane to Tartagal, Argentina. Prisoners took control of the aircraft and received instructions to again fly to Salta, Argentina, as the airfield in Tartagal was not big enough. Upon landing, they told the government of the injustice they were subjected to, and received political asylum.

On October 22, 1956, French forces hijacked a Moroccan airplane carrying leaders of the Algerian National Liberation Front (FLN) during the ongoing Algerian War. The plane, which was carrying Ahmed Ben Bella, Hocine Aït Ahmed, and Mohamed Boudiaf, was destined to leave from Palma de Mallorca for Tunis where the FLN leaders were to conference with Prime Minister Habib Bourguiba, but French forces redirected the flight to occupied Algiers, where the FLN leaders were arrested.

=== 1958–1979 ===
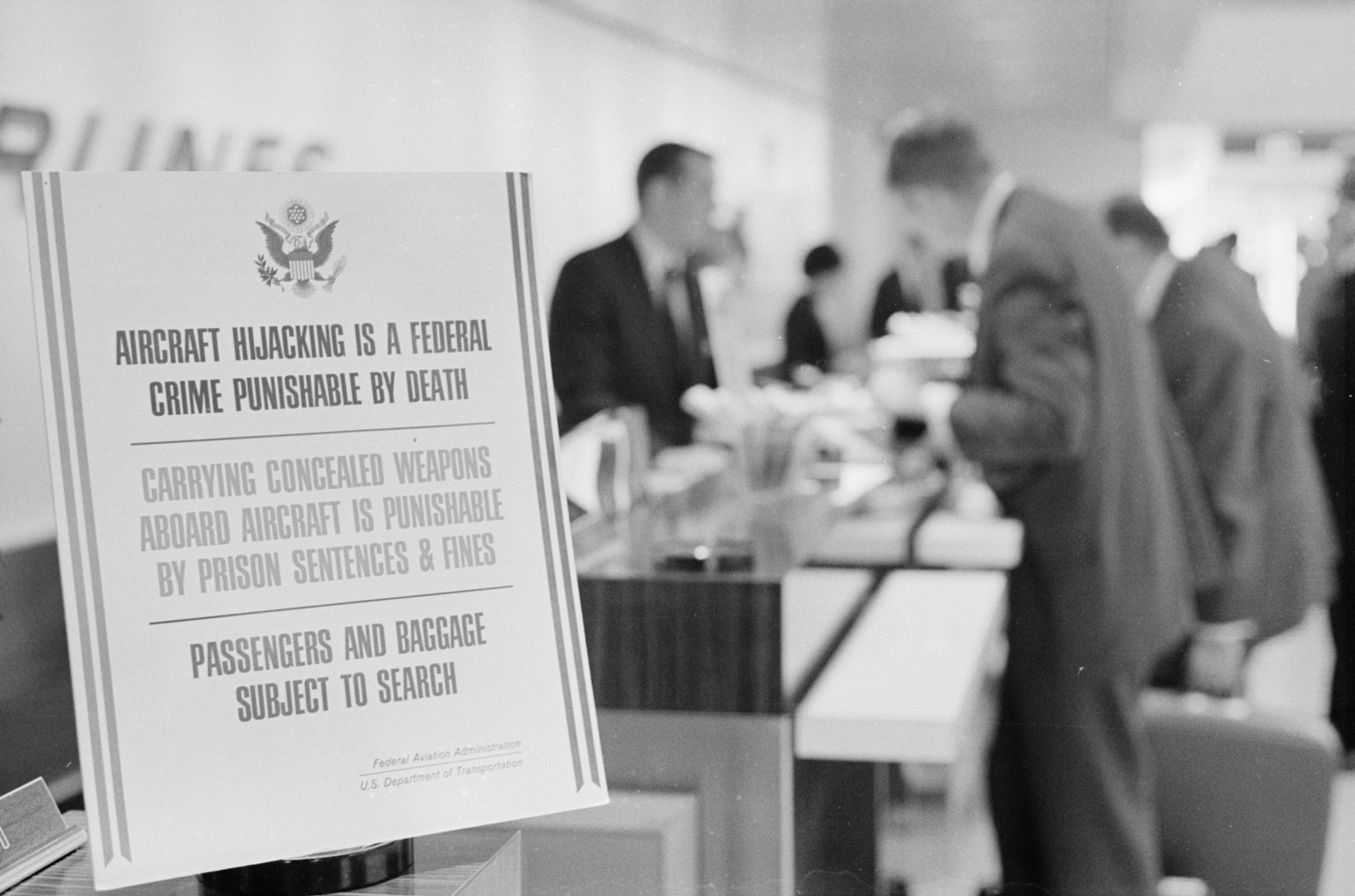
An FAA warning at Washington National Airport prohibiting hijacking and concealed weapons, 1969

World map depicting global aircraft hijacking incidents between 1958 and 1979

Between 1958 and 1967, there were approximately 40 hijackings worldwide. Beginning in 1958, hijackings from Cuba to other destinations started to occur; in 1961, hijackings from other destinations to Cuba became prevalent. The first happened on May 1, 1961, on a flight from Miami to Key West. The perpetrator, armed with a knife and gun, forced the captain to land in Cuba.

Australia was relatively untouched by the threat of hijackings until July 19, 1960. On that evening, a 22-year-old Russian man attempted to divert Trans Australia Airlines Flight 408 to Darwin or Singapore. The crew were able to subdue the man after a brief struggle.

On November 10, 1961, a commercial airliner belonging to the Portuguese company TAP, which departed from Casablanca to Lisbon, was hijacked by a group of six opponents of the dictatorship of Salazar. Under threat of weapons, they forced the pilot to fly over the Portuguese capital and other cities at low altitude, while dropping thousands of leaflets denouncing the fraudulent elections that were to take place days later. The plane then returned to Morocco, where the perpetrators of the hijacking were arrested, but they requested political asylum and were later released without trial.

According to the FAA, in the 1960s, there were 100 attempts of hijackings involving U.S. aircraft: 77 successful and 23 unsuccessful. Recognizing the danger early, the FAA issued a directive on July 28, 1961, which prohibits unauthorized persons from carrying concealed firearms and interfering with crew member duties. The Federal Aviation Act of 1958 was amended to impose severe penalties for those seizing control of a commercial aircraft. Airlines could also refuse to transport passengers who were likely to cause danger. That same year, the FAA and Department of Justice created the Peace Officers Program which put trained marshals on flights. A few years later, on May 7, 1964, the FAA adopted a rule requiring that cockpit doors on commercial aircraft be kept locked at all times. One proposal the FAA had for combating the hijackings was to build a fake Havana airport in Southern Florida. However they determined that it would be too expensive.

Destinations desired by U.S. hijackers, 1968–72
Transport attempts
Destination	Number
Cuba	90
Mexico	4
Italy	3
Canada	2
Bahamas	1
Egypt	1
Israel	1
North Korea	1
North Vietnam	1
South Vietnam	1
Sweden	1
Switzerland	1
United States	1
Unknown	3
Extortion attempts
Extortion	26
Total	137

In a five-year period (1968–1972) the world experienced 326 hijack attempts, or one every 5.6 days. The incidents were frequent and often just an inconvenience, which resulted in television shows creating parodies. Time magazine even ran a lighthearted comedy piece called "What to Do When the Hijacker Comes". Most incidents occurred in the United States. There were two distinct types: hijackings for transportation elsewhere and hijackings for extortion with the threat of harm.

Between 1968 and 1972, there were 90 recorded transport attempts to Cuba. In contrast, there were 26 extortion attempts (see table on the right). The longest and first transcontinental (Los Angeles, Denver, New York, Bangor, Shannon and Rome) hijacking from the US started on 31 October 1969.

The Eastern Air Lines Shuttle Flight 1320 on May 17, 1970, witnessed the first fatality in the course of a U.S. hijacking.

Incidents also became problematic outside of the U.S. For instance, in 1968, El Al Flight 426 was seized by Popular Front for the Liberation of Palestine (PFLP) militants on 23 July, an incident which lasted 40 days, making it one of the longest. This record was later broken in 1999.

As a result of the evolving threat, President Nixon issued a directive in 1970 to promote security at airports, electronic surveillance and multilateral agreements for tackling the problem.

The International Civil Aviation Organization (ICAO) issued a report on aircraft hijacking in July 1970. Beginning in 1969 until the end of June 1970, there were 118 incidents of unlawful seizure of aircraft and 14 incidents of sabotage and armed attacks against civil aviation. This involved airlines of 47 countries and more than 7,000 passengers. In this period, 96 people were killed and 57 were injured as a result of hijacking, sabotage and armed attacks.

The ICAO stated that this is not isolated to one nation or one region, but a worldwide issue to the safe growth of international civil aviation. Incidents also became notorious – in 1971, a man known as D. B. Cooper hijacked a plane and extorted US$200,000 in ransom before parachuting over Oregon. He was never identified.

On August 20, 1971, a Pakistan Air Force T-33 military plane was hijacked prior to the Indo-Pakistani war of 1971 in Karachi. Lieutenant Matiur Rahman attacked Officer Rashid Minhas and attempted to land in India. Minhas deliberately crashed the plane into the ground near Thatta to prevent the diversion.

Countries around the world continued their efforts to tackle crimes committed on-board planes. The Tokyo Convention, drafted in 1958, established an agreement between signatories that the "state in which the aircraft is registered is competent to exercise jurisdiction over crimes committed on board that aircraft while it is in flight". While the Convention does not make hijacking an international crime, it does contain provisions which obligate the country in which a hijacked aircraft lands to restore the aircraft to its responsible owner, and allow the passengers and crew to continue their journey. The Convention came into force in December 1969.

A year later, in December 1970, the Hague Convention was drafted which punishes hijackers, enabling each state to prosecute a hijacker if that state does not extradite them, and to deprive them from asylum from prosecution.

On December 5, 1972, the FAA issued emergency rules requiring all passengers and their carry-on baggage to be screened. Airports slowly implemented walk-through metal detectors, hand-searches and X-ray machines, to prohibit weapons and explosive devices. These rules came into effect on January 5, 1973, and were welcomed by most of the public. In 1974, Congress enacted a statute which provided for the death penalty for acts of aircraft piracy resulting in death. Between 1968 and 1977, there were approximately 41 hijackings per year.

In the 1970s, in pursuit of their demands for Croatia's independence from the Socialist Federative Republic of Yugoslavia, Croatian nationalists hijacked several civilian airliners, such as Scandinavian Airlines System Flight 130 and TWA Flight 355.

=== 1980–2000 ===
By 1980, airport screening and greater cooperation from the international community led to fewer successful hijackings; the number of events had significantly dropped below the 1968 level. Between 1978 and 1988, there were roughly 26 incidents of hijackings a year. A new threat emerged in the 1980s: organised terrorists destroying aircraft to draw attention. For instance, terrorist groups were responsible for the bombing of Air India Flight 182 over the Irish coast. In 1988, Pan Am Flight 103 was bombed flying over Scotland. Terrorist activity which included hijack attempts in the Middle East were also a cause of concern.

During the 1990s, there was relative peace in the United States airspace as the threat of domestic hijacking was seen as a distant memory. Globally, however, hijackings still persisted. Between 1993 and 2003, the highest number of hijackings occurred in 1993 (see table below). This number can be attributed to events in China where hijackers were trying to gain political asylum in Taiwan. Europe and the rest of East Asia were not immune either. On December 26, 1994, Air France Flight 8969 with 172 passengers and crew was hijacked after leaving Algiers. Authorities believed that the goal was to crash the plane into the Eiffel Tower. On June 21, 1995, All Nippon Airways Flight 857 was hijacked by a man claiming to be a member of the Aum Shinrikyo religious cult, demanding the release of its imprisoned leader Shoko Asahara. The incident was resolved when the police stormed the plane.

On October 17, 1996, the first hijacking that was brought to an end while airborne was carried out by four operatives of the Austrian special law enforcement unit Cobra on a Russian Aeroflot flight from Malta to Lagos, Nigeria, aboard a Tupolev Tu-154. The operatives escorted inmates detained for deportation to their homelands and were equipped with weapons and gloves. On 12 April 1999, six ELN members hijacked a Fokker 50 of Avianca Flight 9463, flying from Bucaramanga to Bogotá. Many hostages were held for more than a year, and the last hostage was finally freed 19 months after the hijacking.

Annual hijack incidents, 1993–2003
Year	1993	1994	1995	1996	1997	1998	1999	2000	2001	2002	2003	Total
Number	50	25	8	16	12	14	12	22	5	5	7	176

=== 2001–present ===
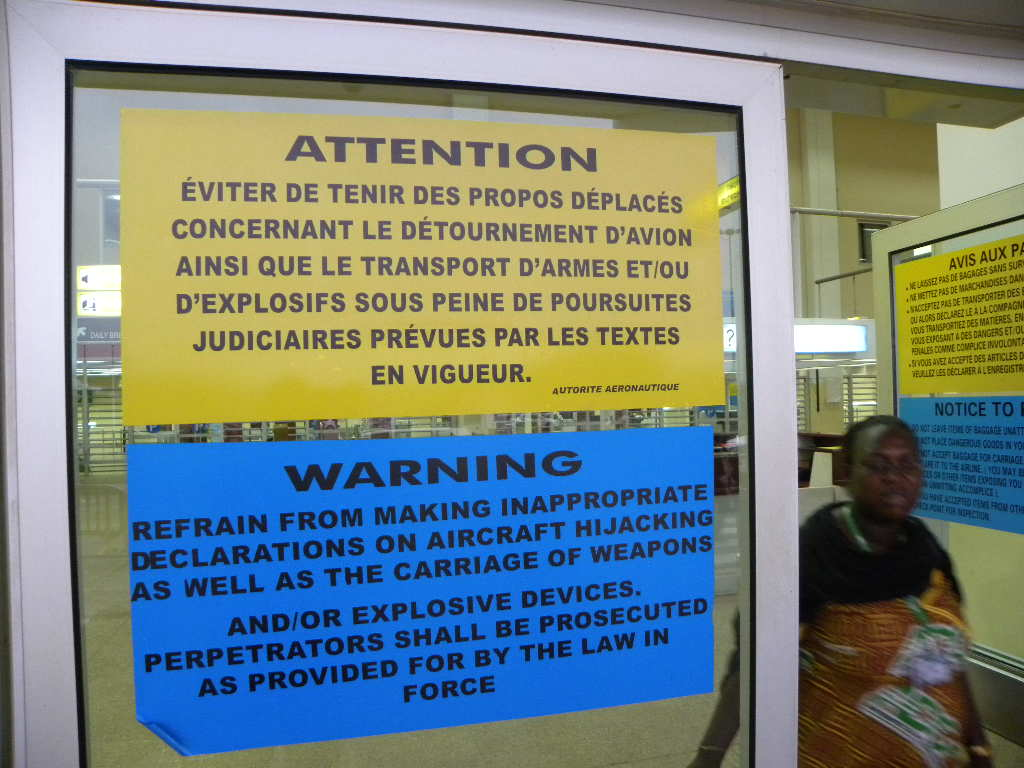
Warning posters in a Central African airport, 2012

On September 11, 2001, four airliners were hijacked by 19 al-Qaeda extremists: American Airlines Flight 11, United Airlines Flight 175, American Airlines Flight 77, and United Airlines Flight 93. The first two planes were deliberately crashed into the Twin Towers of the World Trade Center in New York City and the third was crashed into The Pentagon in Arlington County, Virginia. The fourth crashed in a field in Stonycreek Township near Shanksville, Pennsylvania, after crew and passengers attempted to overpower the hijackers. Authorities believe that the intended target was the U.S. Capitol or the White House in Washington, D.C. In total, 2,996 people (2,977 if excluding the perpetrators) perished and more than 6,000 were injured in the attacks, making the hijackings the deadliest in modern history.

Following the attacks, the U.S. government formed the Transportation Security Administration (TSA) to handle airport screening at U.S. airports. Government agencies around the world tightened their airport security, procedures and intelligence gathering. Until the September 11 attacks, there had never been an incident whereby a passenger aircraft was used as a weapon of mass destruction. The 9/11 Commission report stated that it was always assumed that a "hijacking would take the traditional form"; therefore, airline crews never had a contingency plan for a suicide-hijacking. As Patrick Smith, an airline pilot, summarizes:

One of the big ironies here is the success of the 2001 attacks had nothing to do with airport security in the first place. It was a failure of national security. What the men actually exploited was a weakness in our mind-set – a set of presumptions based on decades-long track record of hijackings. In years past, a hijacking meant a diversion, with hostage negotiations and standoffs. The only weapon that mattered was the intangible one: the element of surprise.

Throughout the mid-2000s, hijackings still occurred but there were much fewer incidents and casualties. The number of incidents had been declining, even before the September 11 attacks. One notable incident in 2006 was the hijacking of Turkish Airlines Flight 1476, flying from Tirana to Istanbul, which was seized by a man named Hakan Ekinci. The aircraft, with 107 passengers and 6 crew, made distress calls to air traffic control and the plane was escorted by military aircraft before landing safely at Brindisi, Italy. In 2007, several incidents occurred in the Middle East and Northern Africa; hijackers in one of these incidents claimed to be affiliated with al-Qaeda. Towards the end of the decade, Aeroméxico experienced its first terror incident when Flight 576 was hijacked by a man demanding to speak with President Felipe Calderón. In 2007, a man failed to hijack a 737-200 with 103 people on board over Chad.

Between 2010 and 2019, the Aviation Safety Network estimates there have been 15 hijackings worldwide with three fatalities. This is a considerably lower figure than in previous decades which can be attributed to greater security enhancements and awareness of September 11–style attacks. On June 29, 2012, an attempt was made to hijack Tianjin Airlines Flight GS7554 from Hotan to Ürümqi in China. More recently was the 2016 hijacking of EgyptAir Flight MS181, involving an Egyptian man who claimed to have a bomb and ordered the plane to land in Cyprus. He surrendered several hours later, after freeing the passengers and crew.

On 30 September 2026, Flydubai Flight 1073, carrying 174 passengers from Dubai to Tel Aviv, rapidly descended by about 18,000 feet (5,500 m) after the co-pilot allegedly stabbed the captain and attempted to crash the aircraft. Several passengers, helped restrain the co-pilot, after which another flight crew regained control and landed safely in Tabuk, Saudi Arabia.

== Countermeasures ==
As a result of the large number of U.S.–Cuba hijackings in the late 1960s to early 1970s, international airports introduced screening technology such as metal detectors, X-ray machines and explosive detection tools. In the U.S., these rules were enforced starting from January 1973 and were eventually copied around the world. These security measures made hijacking a "higher-risk proposition" and deterred criminals in later decades. Until September 2001, the FAA set and enforced a "layered" system of defense: hijacking intelligence, passenger pre-screening, checkpoint screening and on-board security. The idea was that if one layer were later to fail, another would be able stop a hijacker from boarding a plane. However, the 9/11 Commission found that this layered approach was flawed and unsuitable to prevent the September 11 attacks. The U.S. Transportation Security Administration has since strengthened this approach, with a greater emphasis on intelligence sharing.

=== On-board security ===
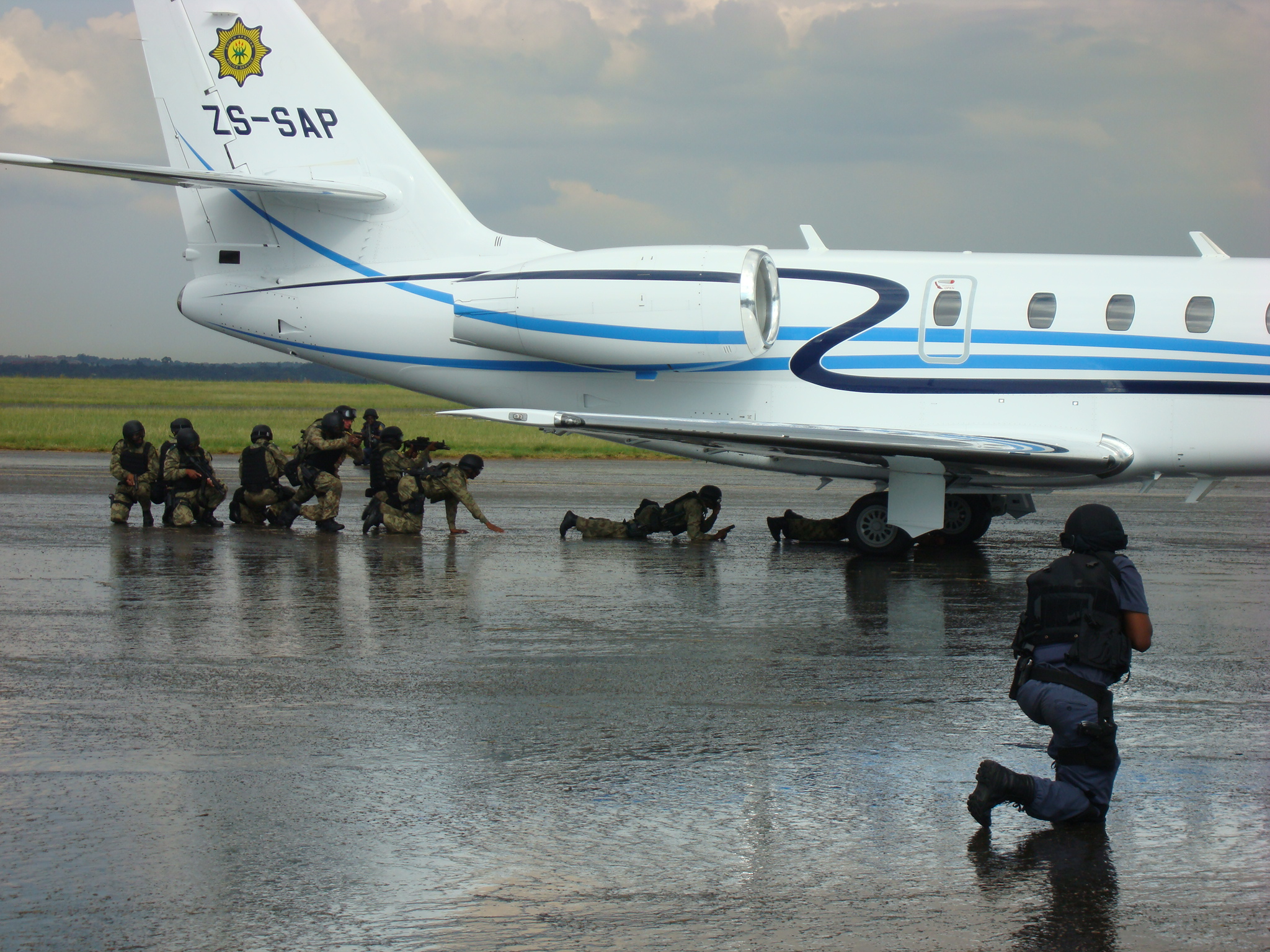
Hijacking assault simulation by South African special forces

In the history of hijackings, most incidents involved planes being forced to land at a certain destination with demands. As a result, commercial airliners adopted a "total compliance" rule which taught pilots and cabin crew to comply with the hijackers' demands. Crews advise passengers to sit quietly to increase their chances of survival. The ultimate goal is to land the plane safely and let the security forces handle the situation. The FAA suggested that the longer a hijacking persisted, the more likely it would end peacefully with the hijackers reaching their goal. Although total compliance is still relevant, the events of September 11 changed this paradigm as this technique cannot prevent a murder–suicide hijacking.

After the September 11 attacks, it became evident that each hijacking situation needs to be evaluated on a case-by-case basis. Cabin crew, now aware of the severe consequences, have a greater responsibility for maintaining control of their aircraft. Most airlines also give crew members training in self-defense tactics. Ever since the 1970s, crew are taught to be vigilant for suspicious behaviour. For example, passengers who have no carry-on luggage, or are standing next to the cockpit door with fidgety movements. There have been various incidents when crew and passengers intervened to prevent attacks: on December 22, 2001, Richard Reid attempted to ignite explosives on American Airlines Flight 63. In 2009, on Northwest Flight 253, Umar Farouk Abdulmutallab attempted to detonate explosives sewn into his underwear. In 2012, the attempted hijacking of Tianjin Airlines Flight 7554 was stopped when cabin crew placed a trolley in-front of the cockpit door and asked passengers for help.

=== Cockpit security ===
As early as 1964, the FAA required cockpit doors on commercial aircraft be kept locked during flight. In 2002, U.S. Congress passed the Arming Pilots Against Terrorism Act, allowing pilots at U.S. airlines to carry guns in the cockpit. Since 2003, these pilots are known as Federal Flight Deck Officers. It is estimated that one in 10 of the 125,000 commercial pilots are trained and armed. Also in 2002, aircraft manufacturers such as Airbus introduced a reinforced cockpit door which is resistant to gunfire and forced entry. Shortly afterwards, the FAA required operators of more than 6,000 aircraft to install tougher cockpit doors by April 9, 2003. Rules were also tightened to restrict cockpit access and make it easier for pilots to lock the doors. In 2015, Germanwings Flight 9525 was seized by the co-pilot and deliberately crashed, while the captain was out. The captain was unable to re-enter the cockpit, because the airline had already reinforced the cockpit door. The European Aviation Safety Agency issued a recommendation for airlines to ensure that at least two people, one pilot and a member of cabin crew, occupy the cockpit during flight. The FAA in the United States enforce a similar rule.

=== Air marshal service ===
Some countries operate a marshal service, which puts members of law enforcement on high-risk flights based on intelligence. Their role is to keep passengers safe, by preventing hijackings and other criminal acts committed on a plane. Federal marshals in the U.S. are required to identify themselves before boarding a plane; marshals of other countries often are not. According to the Congressional Research Service, the budget for the U.S. Federal Air Marshal Service was US$719 million in 2007. Marshals often sit as regular passengers, at the front of the plane to allow observation of the cockpit. Despite the expansion of the marshal service, they cannot be on every plane, and they rarely face a real threat on a flight. Critics have questioned the need for them.

=== Air traffic control ===
There is no generic or set of rules for handling a hijacking situation. Air traffic controllers are expected to exercise their best judgement and expertise when dealing with the apparent consequences of an unlawful interference or hijack. Depending on the jurisdiction, the controller will inform authorities, such as the military, who will escort the hijacked plane. Controllers are expected to keep communications to a minimum and clear the runway for a possible landing.

== Legislation for downing hijacked aircraft ==
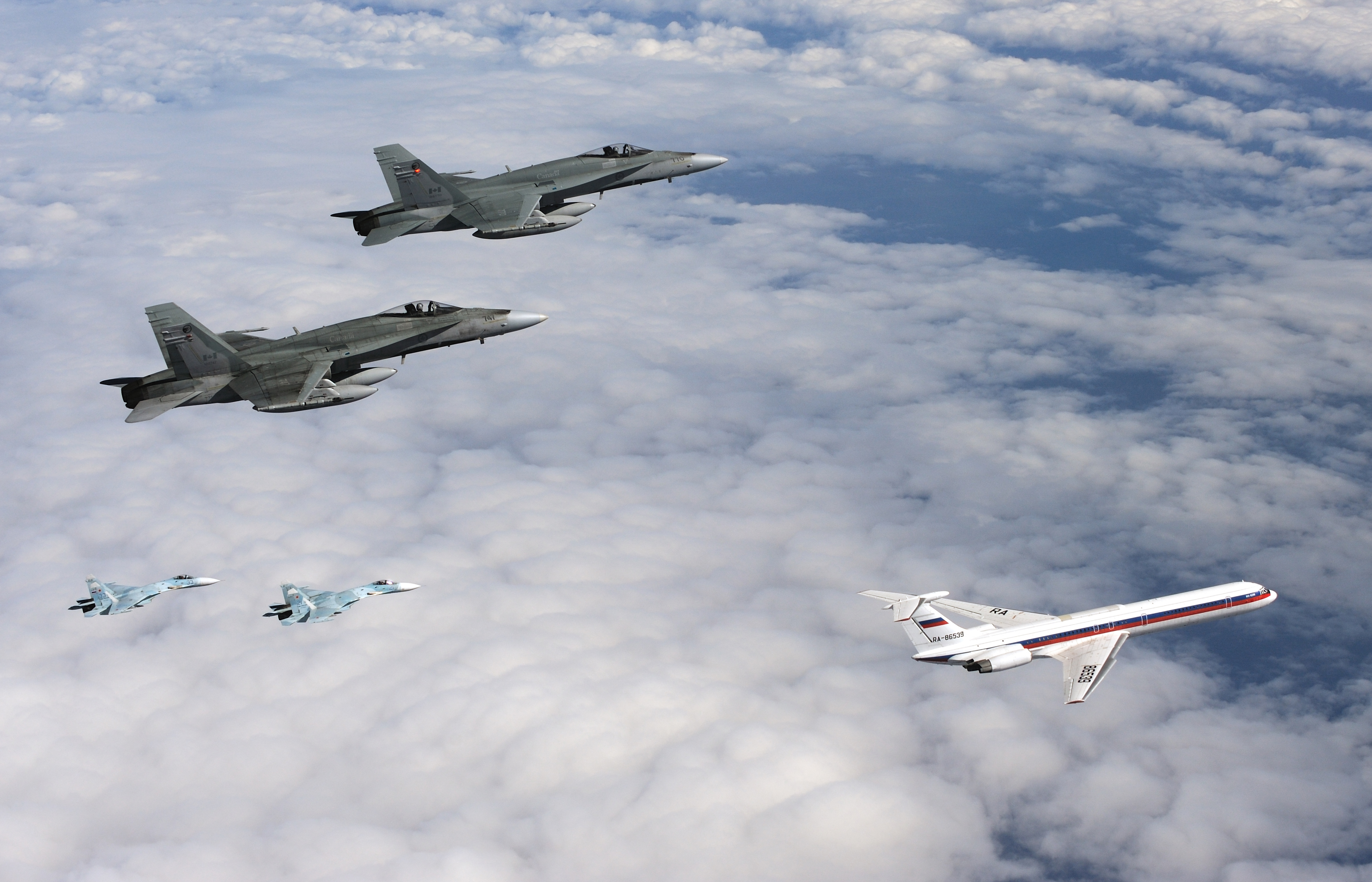
Royal Canadian Air Force and Russian Air Force fighter aircraft during a training exercise for intercepting and transferring a hijacked airliner between Russian and American airspace in 2013

=== Germany ===
In January 2005, a federal law came into force in Germany, called the Luftsicherheitsgesetz, which allows "direct action by armed force" against a hijacked aircraft to prevent a September 11–style attack. However, in February 2006 the Federal Constitutional Court struck down these provisions of the law, stating such preventive measures were unconstitutional and would essentially be state-sponsored murder, even if such an act would save many more lives on the ground. The main reason behind this decision was that the state would effectively be killing innocent hostages in order to avoid a terrorist attack. The Court also ruled that the Minister of Defense is constitutionally not entitled to act in terrorism matters, as this is the duty of the state and federal police forces. President of Germany Horst Köhler urged judicial review of the constitutionality of the Luftsicherheitsgesetz after he signed it into law in 2005.

=== India ===
India published its anti-hijacking policy in August 2005. The policy came into force after approval from the Cabinet Committee on Security (CCS). The main points of the policy are:

- Any attempt to hijack will be considered an act of aggression against the country and will prompt a response fit for an aggressor.
- Hijackers, if captured alive, will be put on trial, convicted, and sentenced to death.
- Hijackers will be engaged in negotiations only to bring the incident to an end, to comfort passengers and to prevent loss of lives.
- The hijacked plane will be shot down if it is deemed to become a missile heading for strategic targets.
- The hijacked plane will be escorted by armed fighter aircraft and will be forced to land.
- A hijacked grounded plane will not be allowed to take off under any circumstance.

=== United States ===
Prior to the September 11 attacks, countermeasures were focused on "traditional" hijackings. As such, there were no specific rules for handling suicide hijackings, where aircraft would be used as a weapon. Moreover, military response at the time consisted of multiple uncoordinated units, each with its own set of rules of engagement with no unified command structure. Soon after the attacks, however, new rules of engagement were introduced, authorizing the North American Aerospace Defense Command (NORAD), the U.S. Air Force command tasked with protecting U.S. airspace, to shoot down hijacked commercial airliners if the plane is deemed a threat to strategic targets. In 2003, the military stated that fighter pilots exercise this scenario several times a week.

=== Other countries ===
Poland and Russia are among other countries that have had laws or directives for shooting down hijacked planes. However, in September 2008 the Polish Constitutional Court ruled that the Polish rules were unconstitutional, and voided them.

== International law ==
=== Tokyo Convention ===
The Convention on Offences and Certain Other Acts Committed on Board Aircraft, known as the Tokyo Convention, is an international treaty which entered force on December 4, 1969. As of 2015, it has been ratified by 186 parties. Article 11 of the Tokyo Convention states the following:

1. When a person on board has unlawfully committed by force or threat thereof an act of interference, seizure, or other wrongful exercise of control of an aircraft in flight or when such an act is about to be committed, Contracting States shall take all appropriate measures to restore control of the aircraft to its lawful commander or to preserve his control of the aircraft. 2. In the cases contemplated in the preceding paragraph, the Contracting State in which the aircraft lands shall permit its passengers and crew to continue their journey as soon as practicable, and shall return the aircraft and its cargo to the persons lawfully entitled to possession.

The signatories agree that if there is unlawful takeover of an aircraft, or a threat of it on their territory, then they will take all necessary measures to regain or keep control over an aircraft. The captain can also disembark a suspected person on the territory of any country, where the aircraft lands, and that country must agree to it, as stated in Articles 8 and 12 of the convention.

=== Hague Convention ===
The Convention for the Suppression of Unlawful Seizure of Aircraft (known as the Hague Convention) went into effect on October 14, 1971. As of 2013, the convention has 185 signatories.

=== Montreal Convention ===
The Montreal Convention is a multilateral treaty adopted by a diplomatic meeting of ICAO member states in 1999. It amended important provisions of the Warsaw Convention's regime concerning compensation for the victims of air disasters.

== In popular culture ==
- The 1942 Superman film Japoteurs depicts Superman saving Metropolis from a bomber plane hijacked by Japanese spies during World War II.
- The 1997 Hollywood film Air Force One is based on the fictional hijacking of Air Force One.
- Hijacking is a central theme in the Turbulence movie trilogy.
- In Mission: Impossible 2, one of the film's antagonists hijacks a plane at the start of the movie.
- The 2006 film United 93 is based on the real events onboard United Airlines Flight 93 one of the four airlines hijacked during the September 11 attacks.
- The 2012 film The Dark Knight Rises features an opening sequence of hijacking and crashing an aircraft for the purpose of kidnapping a man and faking his death.
- The film Con Air features a U.S. Marshals aircraft being hijacked by the maximum-security prisoners on board.
- The Taking of Flight 847: The Uli Derickson Story was a made-for-TV film based on the actual hijacking of TWA Flight 847, as seen through the eyes of the chief flight attendant Uli Derickson.
- Passenger 57 depicts an airline security expert trapped on a passenger jet when terrorists seize control.
- Executive Decision depicts a Boeing 747 carrying 400 passengers being hijacked by Algerian terrorists, and U.S. marine and Army special forces use a reconnaissance aircraft to re-take the plane.
- Skyjacked is a 1972 film about a crazed Vietnam War veteran hijacking an airliner, demanding to be taken to the Soviet Union.
- The 1986 film The Delta Force depicted a Special Forces squad tasked with retaking a plane hijacked by Lebanese terrorists, loosely based on the hijacking of TWA Flight 847.
- The 2004 film The Assassination of Richard Nixon, based on a true incident, depicts a disillusioned tire salesman who attempts to hijack a plane in 1974 and crash it into the White House. His attempt failed and he was mortally wounded by an airport policeman. He killed himself before police stormed the plane.
- The 2006 film Snakes On a Plane is a fictional story about aircraft piracy through the in-flight release of venomous snakes.
- In Harold and Kumar 2, two U.S. Air Marshals subdue Harold and Kumar on board a plane after mistaking them for terrorists.
- The 2011 film Payanam is a movie entirely based on the negotiations and rescue operations done by the Indian security forces in response to a flight hijacking incident.
- In the 2013 video game Grand Theft Auto V the player is tasked with hijacking a cargo plane carrying a large shipment of weapons by crashing a crop duster into the cargo bay mid-flight and fighting to seize control of the aircraft. The cargo plane is later shot down by the US Air Force, requiring the player to bail out.
- The 2014 film Non-Stop depicts an aircraft hijacking.
- The Indian film Neerja is based on the hijacking of Pan Am Flight 73 in Karachi.
- In 2016, German television broadcast the film The Verdict, in which a Bundeswehr military pilot shoots down a hijacked passenger plane with 164 people on board that was heading towards a stadium filled with 70,000 people. Following the broadcast, a public vote was called for in Germany, Austria and Switzerland, and 86.9% of viewers voted that the pilot was not guilty of murder.
- The 2019 film 7500 depicts the struggle of a pilot to land an aircraft and maintain control of its cockpit during a hijacking.
- The 2023 Apple TV+ original series Hijack stars Idris Elba as Sam, a talented business negotiator, who embarks on a mission to broker a peaceful end to a hijacking of his 7-hour flight from Dubai to London.
- The 2024 Indian Netflix web-series IC 814: The Kandahar Hijack reconstructs the real events onboard Indian Airlines Flight 814
- The 2025 Vietnamese movie Flight To The Death On The Air reconstructs the hijacking of Vietnam Civil Aviation Flight 501, which is considered as the first Vietnamese movie about aircraft hijacking.

== See also ==
- List of aircraft hijackings
- Air pirate
- Airport security
- El Al
- List of Cuba–United States aircraft hijackings
- Terrorism
