= Avianca =

Flag carrier of Colombia

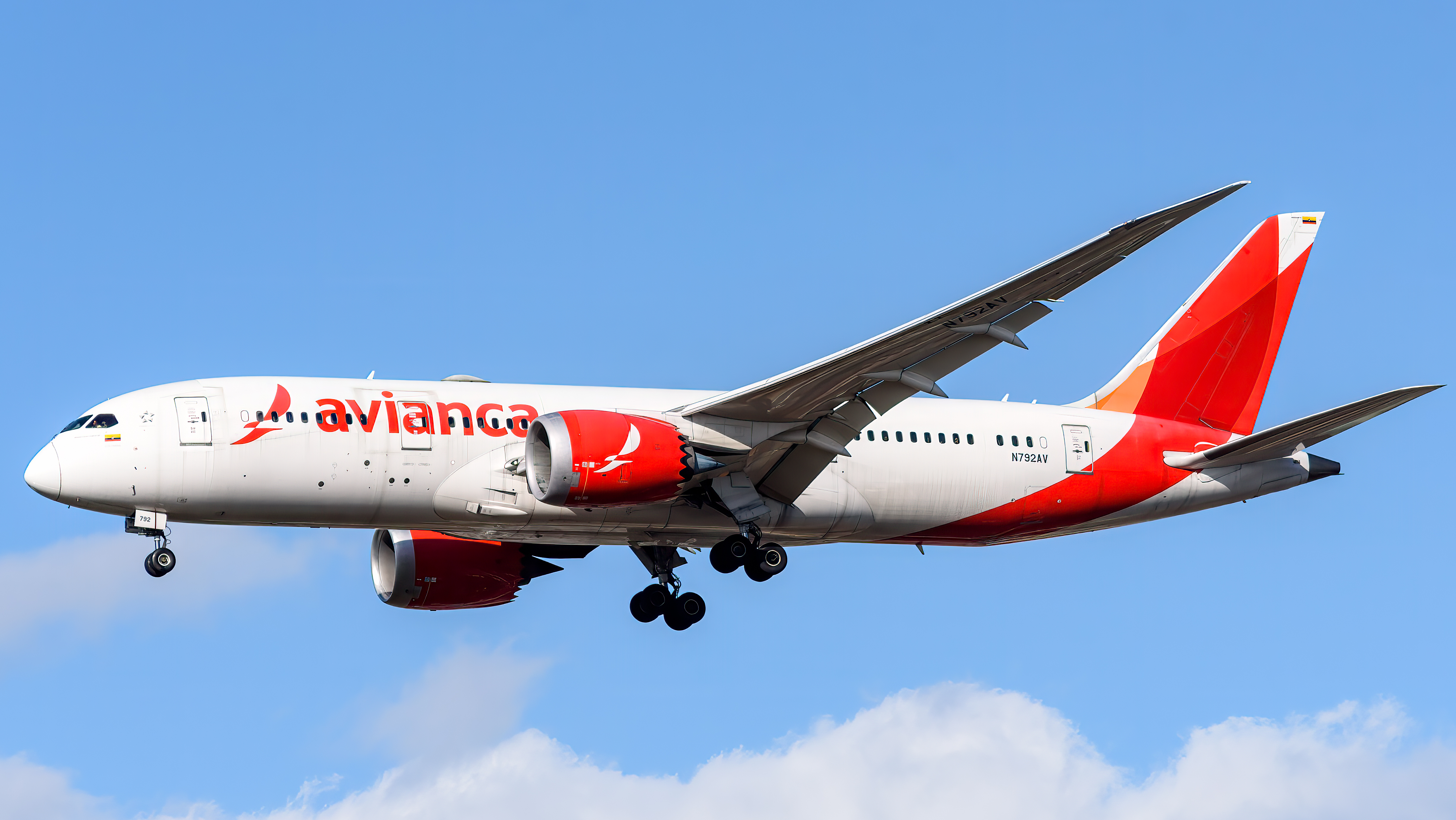
- Avianca Boeing 787-8
IATA	ICAO	Call sign
AV	AVA	AVIANCA
- Founded: December 5, 1919; 106 years ago (as SCADTA)
- AOC #: ANCF173C
- Hubs: Bogotá
- Secondary hubs: Cali; Cartagena; Medellín–JMC
- Focus cities: Barranquilla; Miami; San José (CR); Quito
- Frequent-flyer program: LifeMiles
- Alliance: Star Alliance
- Fleet size: 102
- Destinations: 74
- Parent company: Avianca Group
- Headquarters: Registered office: Barranquilla, Colombia; Corporate headquarters: Bogotá, Colombia
- Key people: Roberto Kriete (Chairman); Gabriel Oliva (CEO); Rohit Philip (CFO)
- Operating income: ▲COP 100.3 B (FY 2019 Q3)
- Total assets: ▲COP 2.403.632 M (FY 2008)
- Employees: 9,853 (2020)
- Website: www.avianca.com

Avianca S.A. (acronym in Spanish for Aerovías del Continente Americano S.A.; lit. 'Airways of the Americas Inc.'), stylized as avianca since October 2023, is the largest airline in Colombia. It has been the flag carrier of Colombia since December 5, 1919, when it was initially registered under the name SCADTA. It is headquartered in Colombia, with its registered office in Barranquilla and its global headquarters in Bogotá and main hub at El Dorado International Airport. Avianca is the flagship of a group of airlines of the Americas, which operates as one airline using a codesharing system. Avianca is the largest airline in Colombia and second largest in South America, after LATAM of Chile. Avianca and its subsidiaries have the most extensive network of destinations in the Americas. Before the merger with TACA in 2010, it was wholly owned by Synergy Group, a South American holding company established by Germán Efromovich and specializing in air transport. It is listed on the Colombia Stock Exchange.

Through SCADTA, Avianca is one of the world's oldest extant airlines and dates its founding to 1919. It became a member of Star Alliance on June 21, 2012, after a process that lasted approximately 18 months from the initial announcement of its invitation to join the alliance. On May 10, 2020, Avianca filed for Chapter 11 bankruptcy in a court in New York City, and liquidated its subsidiary Avianca Perú, due to the COVID-19 pandemic crisis.

== History ==
=== SCADTA (1919–1940) ===
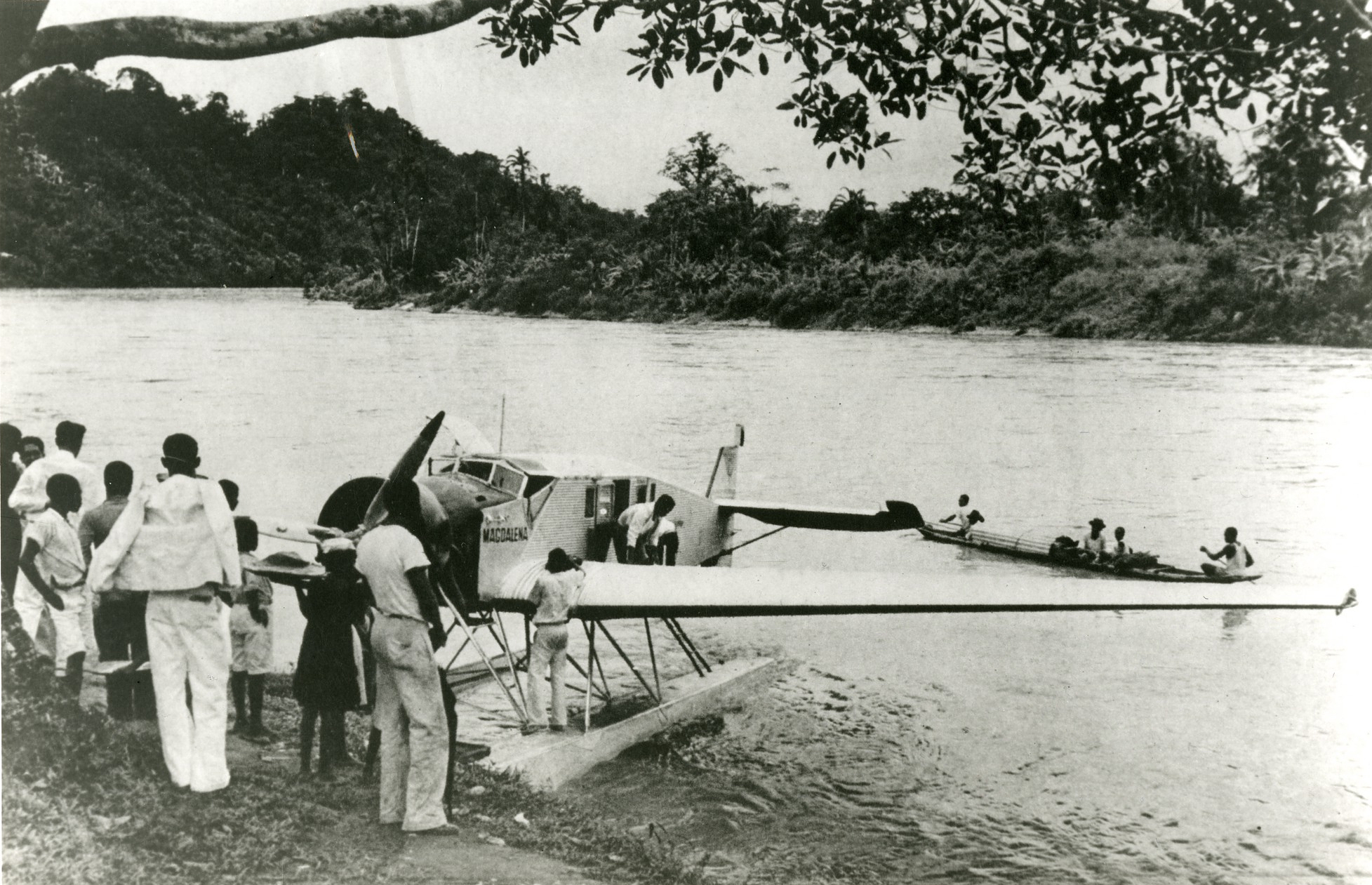
A SCADTA Junkers W 34 "Magdalena", circa 1920s

The airline traces its history back to December 5, 1919, in the city of Barranquilla, Colombia. Colombians Ernesto Cortissoz Alvarez-Correa (the first President of the airline), Rafael María Palacio, Cristóbal Restrepo, Jacobo Correa, Aristides Noguera, and Germans Werner Kämmerer, Stuart Hosie, and Albert Tietjen founded the Colombo-German Company, called Sociedad Colombo-Alemana de Transportes Aéreos or SCADTA. The company accomplished its first flight on September 5, 1920, between Barranquilla and the nearby town of Puerto Colombia using a Junkers F.13, transporting 57 pieces of mail. The flight was piloted by German Helmuth von Krohn. This and another aircraft of the same type were completely mechanically constructed monoplanes, the engines of which had to be modified to efficiently operate in the climate of the country. There were nine aircraft in the fleet with a total range of 850 km (528 mi), which could carry up to four passengers and two crewmen. Due to the topographic characteristics of the country and the lack of airports at the time, floats were adapted for two of the Junkers aircraft to make water landings in the rivers near different towns. Using these floats, Helmuth von Krohn was able to perform the first inland flight over Colombia on October 20, 1920, following the course of the Magdalena River; the flight took eight hours and required four emergency landings in the water.

Soon after the airline was founded, German scientist and philanthropist Peter von Bauer became interested in the airline and contributed general knowledge, capital and a tenth aircraft for the company, as well as obtaining concessions from the Colombian government to operate the country's airmail transportation division using the airline, which began in 1922. This new contract allowed SCADTA to thrive in a new frontier of aviation. By the mid-1920s, SCADTA started its first international routes covering destinations in Venezuela and the United States. In 1924, the aircraft that both Ernesto Cortissoz and Helmuth von Krohn were flying crashed into an area currently known as Bocas de Ceniza in Barranquilla, killing them. In the early 1940s, Peter von Bauer sold his shares in the airline to the US-owned Pan Am.

=== Colombia flag carrier (1940–1994) ===
On June 14, 1940, in the city of Barranquilla, SCADTA, under ownership by United States businessmen, merged with regional Colombian airline SACO, forming the new Aerovías Nacionales de Colombia S.A. or Avianca. Five Colombians participated in this: Rafael María Palacio, Jacobo A. Correa, Cristobal Restrepo, and Aristides Noguera, as well as German citizens Albert Teitjen, Werner Kämerer, and Stuart Hosie, while the post of first President of Avianca was filled by Martín del Corral. Avianca claims SCADTA's history as its own.

In 1946, Avianca began flights to Quito, Lima, Panama City, Miami, New York City and Europe, using Douglas DC-4s and C-54 Skymasters. In 1951, Avianca acquired Lockheed Constellations and Super Constellations. In 1956, the company transported the Colombian delegation to the 1956 Summer Olympics in Melbourne on a 61-hour trip, stopping only to refuel.

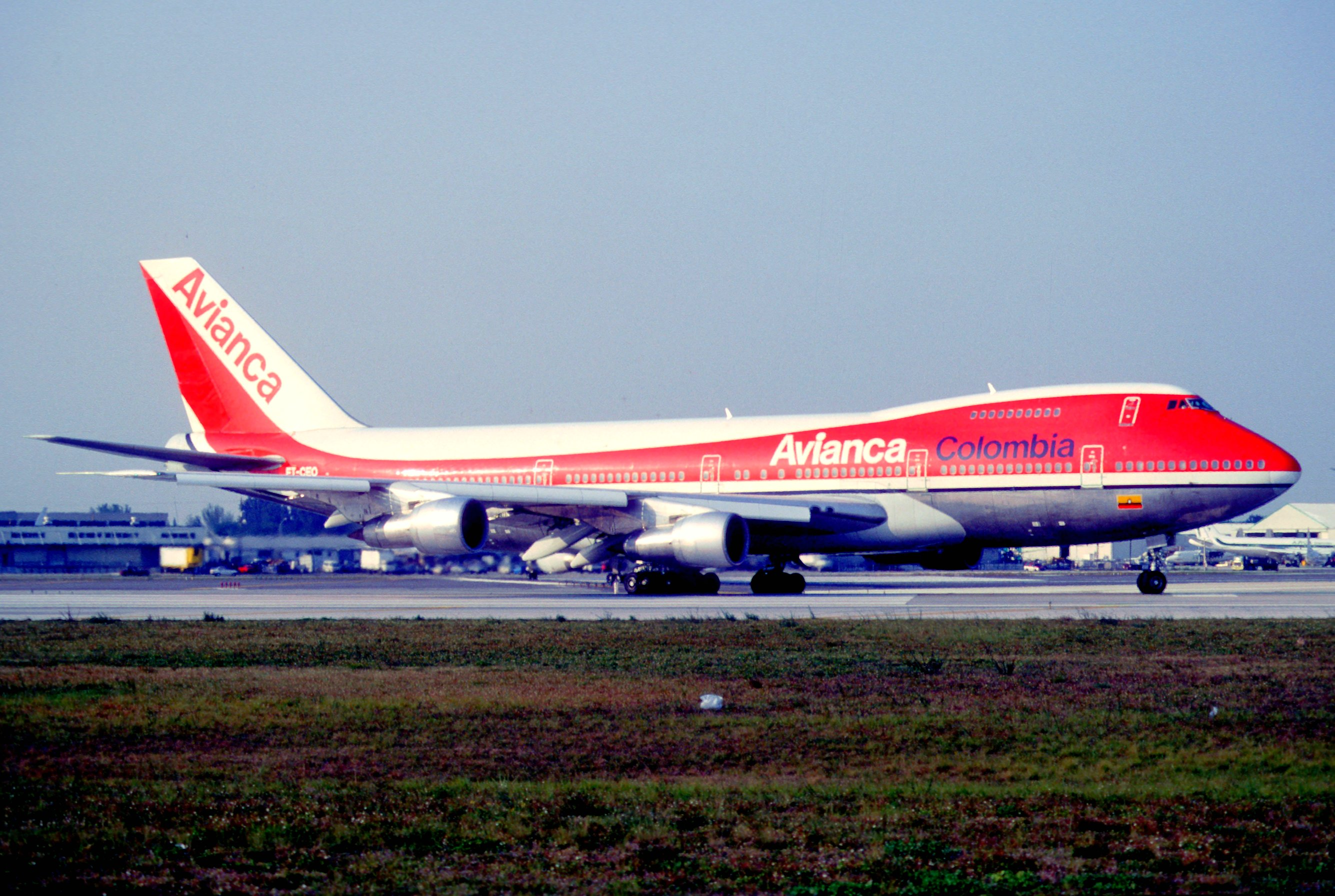
A Boeing 747-100 at Miami International Airport in 1993

During the 1960s, the company built the Avianca Building in Bogotá, designed by the architect Germán Samper, which was inaugurated in 1969 on the south side of Santander Park. In 1961, Avianca leased two Boeing 707s to operate its international routes, and on November 2, 1961, it acquired its own Boeing 720s. In 1976, Avianca became the first South American airline to continuously operate the Boeing 747. Three years later, it started operations with more 747s, including two Combi aircraft, mixing cargo and passenger operations.

In 1981, Avianca undertook the construction of a new exclusive terminal called the Terminal Puente Aéreo, which was eventually inaugurated by President Julio César Turbay Ayala. Avianca's original purpose for the terminal was for flights serving Cali, Medellín, Miami, and New York.

=== Merger system (1994–2002) ===
In 1994, Avianca, the regional carrier SAM and the helicopter operator Helicol merged, beginning Avianca's new system of operations. This arrangement allowed for specialized services in cargo (Avianca Cargo) and postal services, as well as a more modern fleet, made up of Boeing 767s, Boeing 757s, MD-83s, Fokker 50s, and Bell helicopters. In September 1996, Avianca Postal Services became Deprisa, which provided various mail services.

On December 10, 1998, Avianca officially opened its new hub in Bogotá, offering around 6,000 possible connections per week, and an increased number of frequencies, schedules, and destinations, taking advantage of the privileged geographical location of the country's capital, for the benefit of Colombian and international travelers between South America, Europe, and North America.

=== Summa Alliance (2002–2004) ===
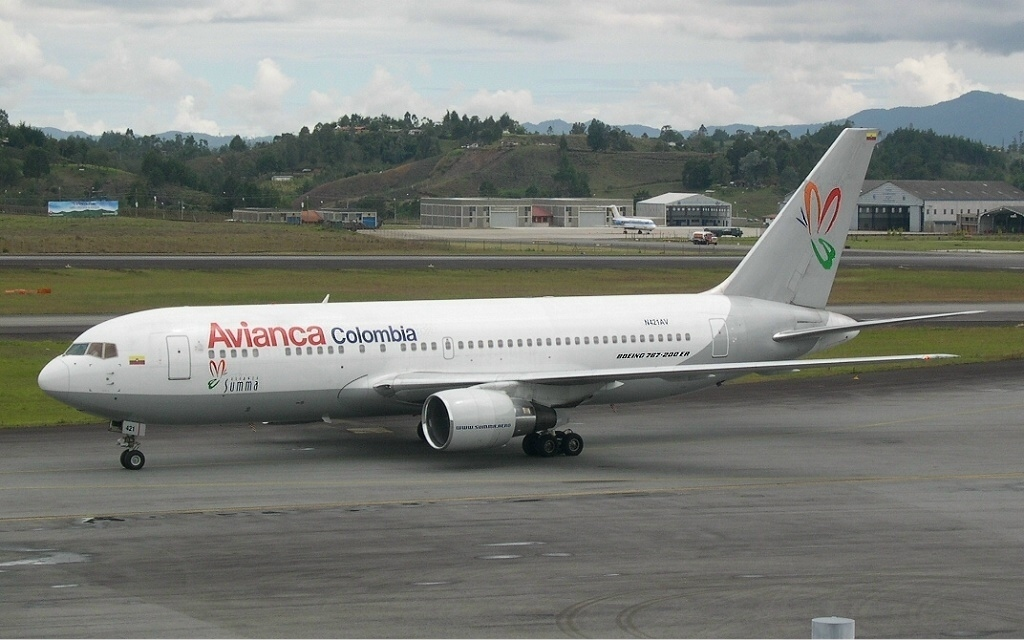
A Boeing 767-200ER taxiing at José María Córdova International Airport in 2004

After the September 11 attacks, Avianca, SAM, and their major rival ACES joined efforts to create the Alianza Summa, which began merged operations on May 20, 2002, to offer a more efficient service concerning quality, quantity, security, and competition in a new struggling marketplace. However, adverse circumstances within the industry and markets forced the alliance to disband. In November 2003, the Alianza Summa was disbanded, ACES was liquidated altogether, and SAM was acquired to be a regional carrier under Avianca's brand.

=== Airways of the Americas (2004–2009) ===
On December 10, 2004, Avianca concluded a major reorganization process, undertaken after filing for Chapter 11 bankruptcy protection, by obtaining confirmation of its reorganization plan, which was financially backed by the Brazilian consortium, Synergy Group and the National Federation of Coffee Growers of Colombia, allowing the airline to obtain funds for US$63 million, in the 13 months following withdrawal from bankruptcy.

Avianca's former logo (2005–2013)

Under this plan, Avianca was bought by Synergy Group and was consolidated with its subsidiaries OceanAir and VIP. The company's full legal name was changed from Aerovías Nacionales de Colombia (National Airways of Colombia) to Aerovías del Continente Americano (Airways of the continent of America), retaining the acronym Avianca. On February 28, 2005, Avianca presented its new logo and livery.

=== Avianca–TACA merger (2009–2013) ===
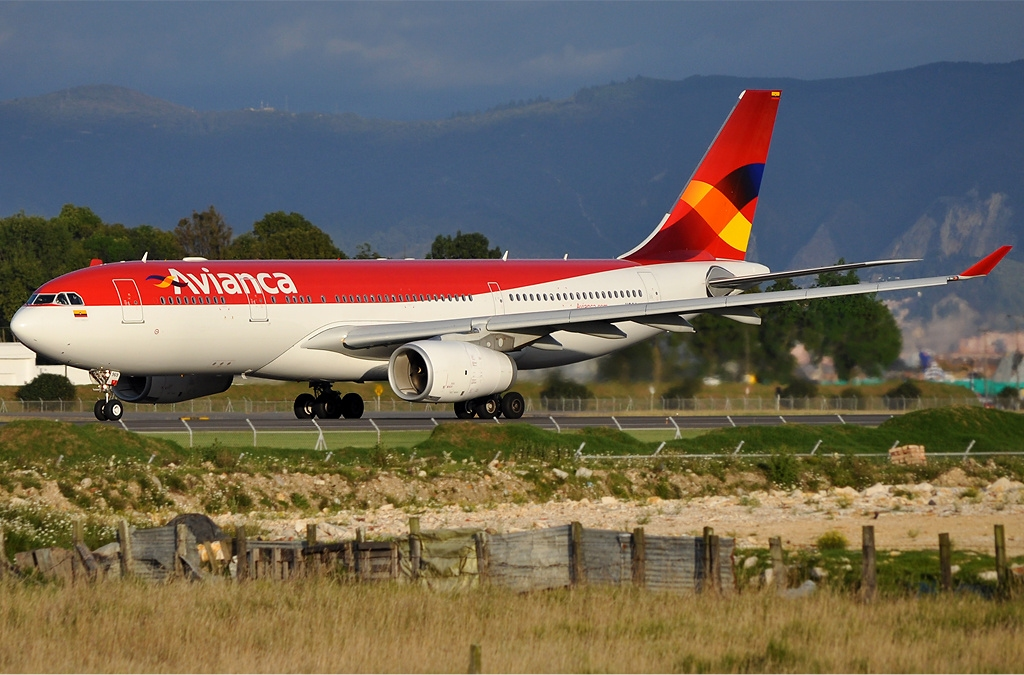
An Airbus A330-200 at El Dorado International Airport in 2009

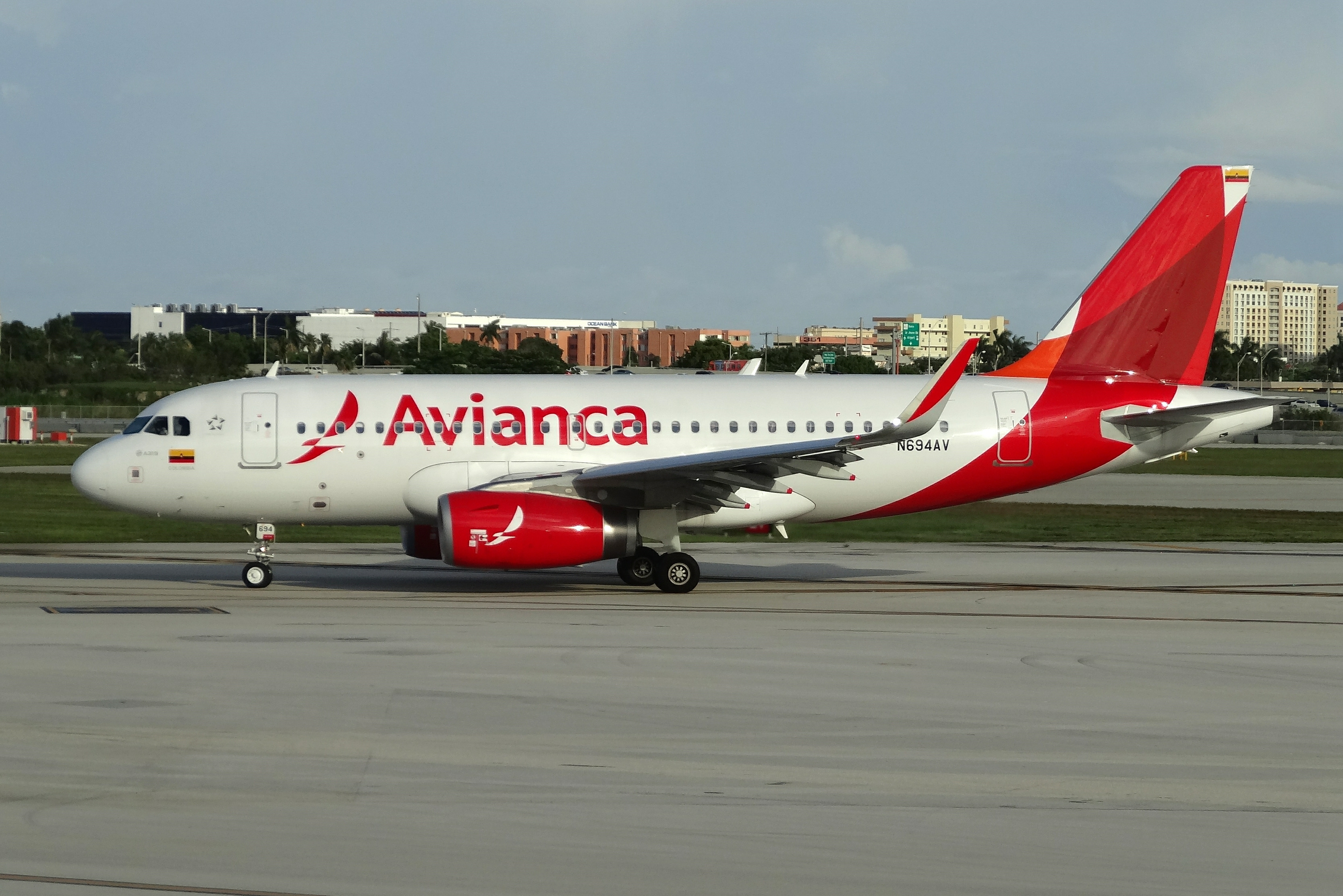
An Airbus A319-100 at Miami International Airport in 2014

In October 2009, it was announced that Avianca would merge with TACA Airlines. This created AviancaTaca Holding, which instantly became one of the region's largest airlines, with 129 aircraft and flights to more than 100 destinations.

In November 2009, the airline's Chief Executive Fabio Villegas announced that the airline was looking to replace its Fokker 50 and Fokker 100 with newer aircraft of 100 seats or fewer. On January 1, 2011, the airline decided to retire the Fokker 100 in 2011 and replace them with 10 Airbus A318s leased from GECAS. The aircraft were delivered from February to April 2011.

==== Star Alliance ====
On November 10, 2010, Star Alliance announced that Avianca (and its merger counterpart, TACA) would be full members in 2012. Due to Avianca's entry into Star Alliance, it ended its codeshare agreement with Delta Air Lines and began a new codeshare agreement with United Airlines. TACA has been codesharing with United Airlines since 2006. On June 21, 2012, Avianca and TACA were both officially admitted into Star Alliance.

=== Avianca Holdings (2013–2019) ===
On March 21, 2013, at the annual general meeting, the shareholders approved the change of corporate name from AviancaTaca Holding to Avianca Holdings. TACA and all other AviancaTaca airlines changed their brand to Avianca on May 28, 2013.

As of 2017, Avianca operates the second-most daily international flights from Miami with 16, second only to American Airlines.

In August 2018, Avianca had some operational difficulties due to problems with the platform it used to assign crew schedules. This resulted in the cancellation of several flights within Colombia. Likewise, due to the stoppage of ACDAC pilots in 2017, all flight itineraries managed by the airline were restored only in October 2018.

On March 1, 2019, Avianca launched a subsidiary named Avianca Express, which operated ATR-72s on short regional flights within Colombia.

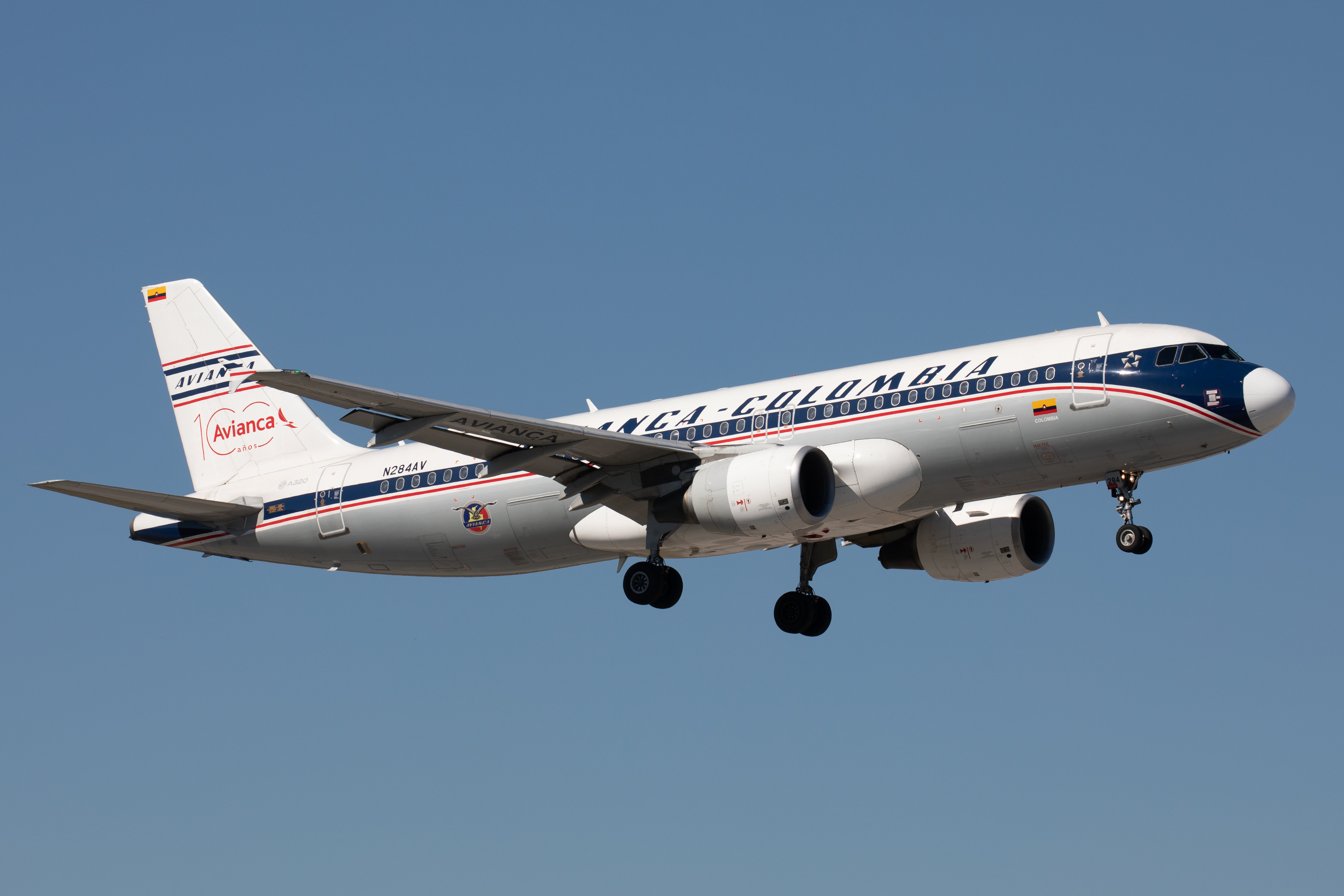
An Airbus A320-200, painted in "retro" livery, celebrating the airline's 100th anniversary

=== 2020 bankruptcy (2020–2021) ===
Avianca had significant financial liabilities in 2019. As a result, they issued additional debt to cover short-term liabilities and completed a debt exchange on December 31, 2019. In response to the global outbreak of COVID-19, the Colombian government's lockdown suspended Avianca's domestic and international operations; most of the company’s 20,000 employees went without pay throughout this period, and the airline operated no scheduled passenger flights between late March and May outside of repatriation missions. As a result of this temporary cessation of business, the company saw 80% of its revenue stop.

Avianca Holdings and 23 affiliated debtors filed for Chapter 11 bankruptcy in the United States District Court for the Southern District of New York on May 10, 2020, as a direct result of the COVID-19 pandemic and subsequent global shutdown, and their financial situation before and during the crisis. The airline holding liquidated its subsidiary Avianca Perú the same day. The debtors were granted joint administration of the cases under Case No. 20-11133. The airline had accumulated a total debt of USD 7.3 billion at the end of 2019.

Avianca implemented numerous cost-reduction plans during and following their bankruptcy including simplifying their fleet to only Airbus A320 and Boeing 787-8 aircraft, redesigning the cabins and increasing the capacity of those aircraft, and introducing new, cheaper, and more competitive fares with increased options for flexibility including checked and carry-on bags, seat selection, and priority boarding.

In November 2021, Avianca Holdings announced they would move their legal address from Panama to the United Kingdom, and that they would change their name to Avianca Group. Their global headquarters remains in Bogotá. On November 2, 2021, Avianca's reorganization plan was approved by the court, and on December 1, 2021, more than a year and a half after filing, Avianca emerged from Chapter 11 bankruptcy for the second time in its history.

=== Abra Group and Viva Air merger (2022–present) ===
On April 29, 2022, Avianca announced plans to acquire low-cost competitor Viva Air Colombia and its subsidiary Viva Air Perú. On May 11, 2022, it was announced that Avianca planned to merge with Viva Air, and Gol Linhas Aéreas Inteligentes to form the Abra Group, and that Avianca would be the acquiring company. The merger was rejected by the Colombian Civil Aviation Authority in November 2022. Avianca stated that the rejection of the merger would not affect the plans for the Abra Group.

In September 2022, Ecuador's Superintendency for the Control of Market Power became the first government body to approve the merger. In December 2022, Avianca stated that they had reached all necessary agreements for the group bar "certain financing", and that they had obtained approval from regulatory bodies in Brazil and the United States. Avianca also stated that they do not need regulatory approval in Colombia because GOL has no presence in the country, and hence there would be no overlap in Colombia.

On January 19, 2023, the Ministry of Transport and Aerocivil formally annulled the November 2022 decision to reject the Avianca–Viva Air merger, citing "procedural irregularities" found within the first review process. A second review is due to take place in "an urgent manner", because the merger proposal was filed under "exception for a company in crisis", referencing Viva Air's financial situation.

On March 21, 2023, Aerocivil announced that it would approve the Avianca–Viva merger conditionally if the new entity complied with the following: to either refund or honor passengers' cancelled bookings made before Viva Air suspended operations; to return some in-demand slots at Bogotá's El Dorado Airport previously held by Viva Air; to maintain Viva Air's low-cost model for consumers within Colombia; to reinstate flights between Bogotá and Buenos Aires; to maintain a fare cap on routes where the entity is the only operator; and, as the new entity would hold a majority of the market share in Colombia, to ensure that the market remains dynamic.

On May 13, 2023, after analyzing the "financial and technical implications" of the merger under these conditions, Avianca withdrew its plans to acquire Viva Air, given the strict requirements of Aerocivil and the damage that these would have on the airline's economy.

In October 2023, the company announced a rebrand and changes to its business model. Avianca changed its name from Avianca to avianca, adjusting its operating model to a more low-cost-friendly one.

== Corporate affairs ==
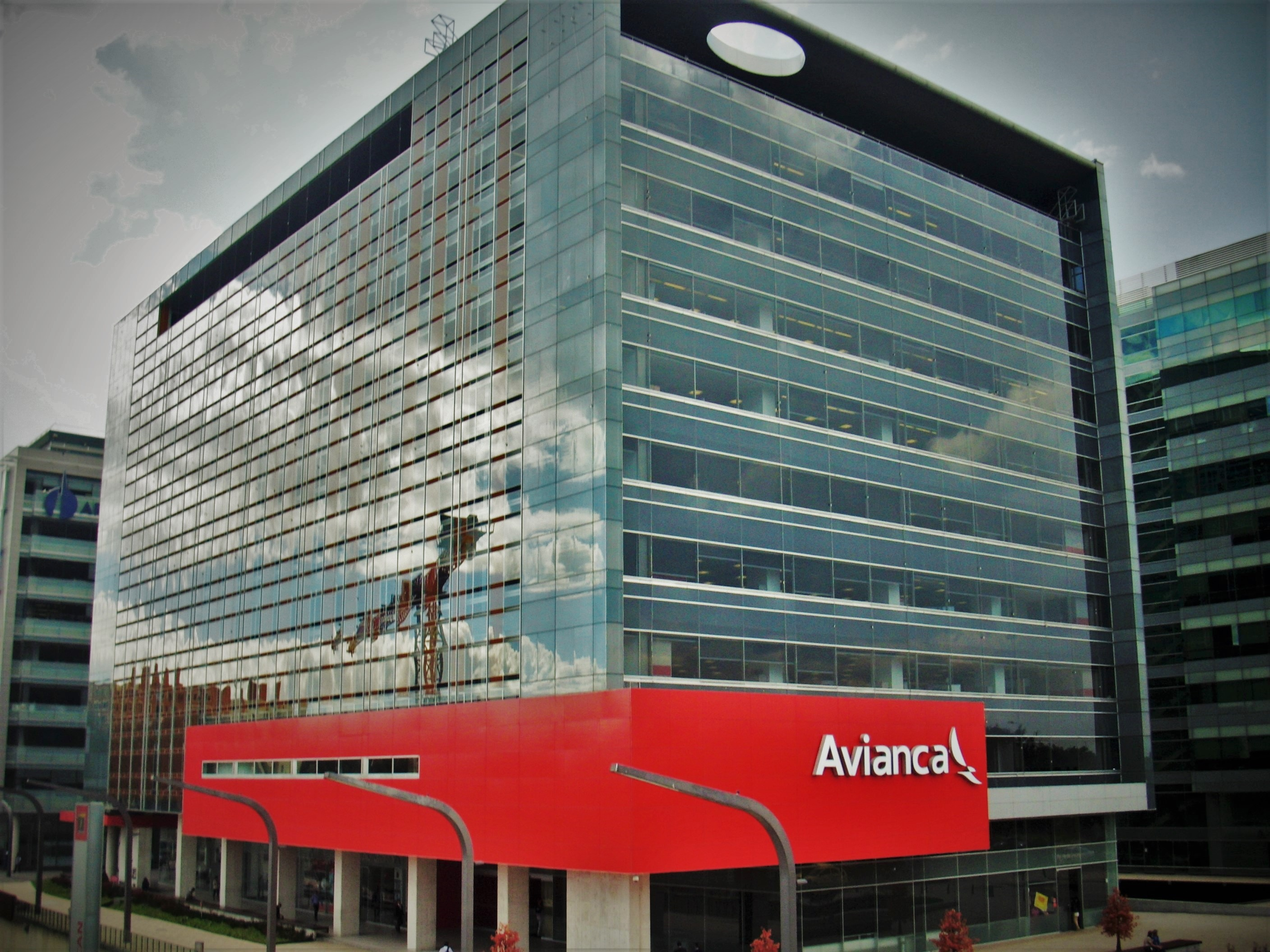
Avianca's headquarters, designed by Esguerra Saenz Urdaneta Samper

Avianca's headquarters are on Avenida El Dorado and between Carrera 60 and Gobernación de Cundinamarca, located in the Ciudad Salitre area of Bogotá. The building is located next to the Gran Estación. Its previous head office was at Avenida El Dorado No. 93-30.

== Destinations ==
Avianca's main hub is located in Bogotá, at El Dorado International Airport with its focus cities in Medellín, San José, and Miami, in the latter of which Avianca is the largest foreign carrier by number of passengers.

=== Codeshare agreements ===
Avianca has codeshare agreements with the following airlines:

- Aeroméxico
- Air Canada
- Air China
- Air India
- All Nippon Airways
- Austrian Airlines
- Avianca El Salvador
- Azul Brazilian Airlines
- Boliviana de Aviación
- Brussels Airlines
- Clic Air
- Copa Airlines
- Cubana de Aviación
- Etihad Airways
- EVA Air
- Gol Linhas Aéreas Inteligentes
- Iberia
- ITA Airways
- Lufthansa
- Scandinavian Airlines
- Singapore Airlines
- Star Perú
- Swiss International Air Lines
- TAP Air Portugal
- Thai Airways International
- Turkish Airlines
- United Airlines

=== Interline agreements ===
Avianca has interline agreements with the following airlines:

- APG Airlines
- French Bee
- Norse Atlantic Airways.
- Viva

== LifeMiles ==
The frequent-flyer program of Avianca and its subsidiaries is LifeMiles. This program is designed to reward customer loyalty in the airline, travel, and retail sectors. LifeMiles members can earn miles every time they fly with Avianca, Star Alliance member airlines, as well as GOL Airlines, Aeromexico and Iberia.

The program was launched in 2011 with the merger of Avianca and TACA, replacing its former AviancaPlus program. LifeMiles has been awarded 14 Freddie Awards for its outstanding performance and promotions in the Americas during the last 9 years.

LifeMiles has four elite tiers:

- Red Plus (Star Alliance Silver)
- Silver (Star Alliance Silver)
- Gold (Star Alliance Gold)
- Diamond (Star Alliance Gold)

== Fleet ==
=== Current fleet ===
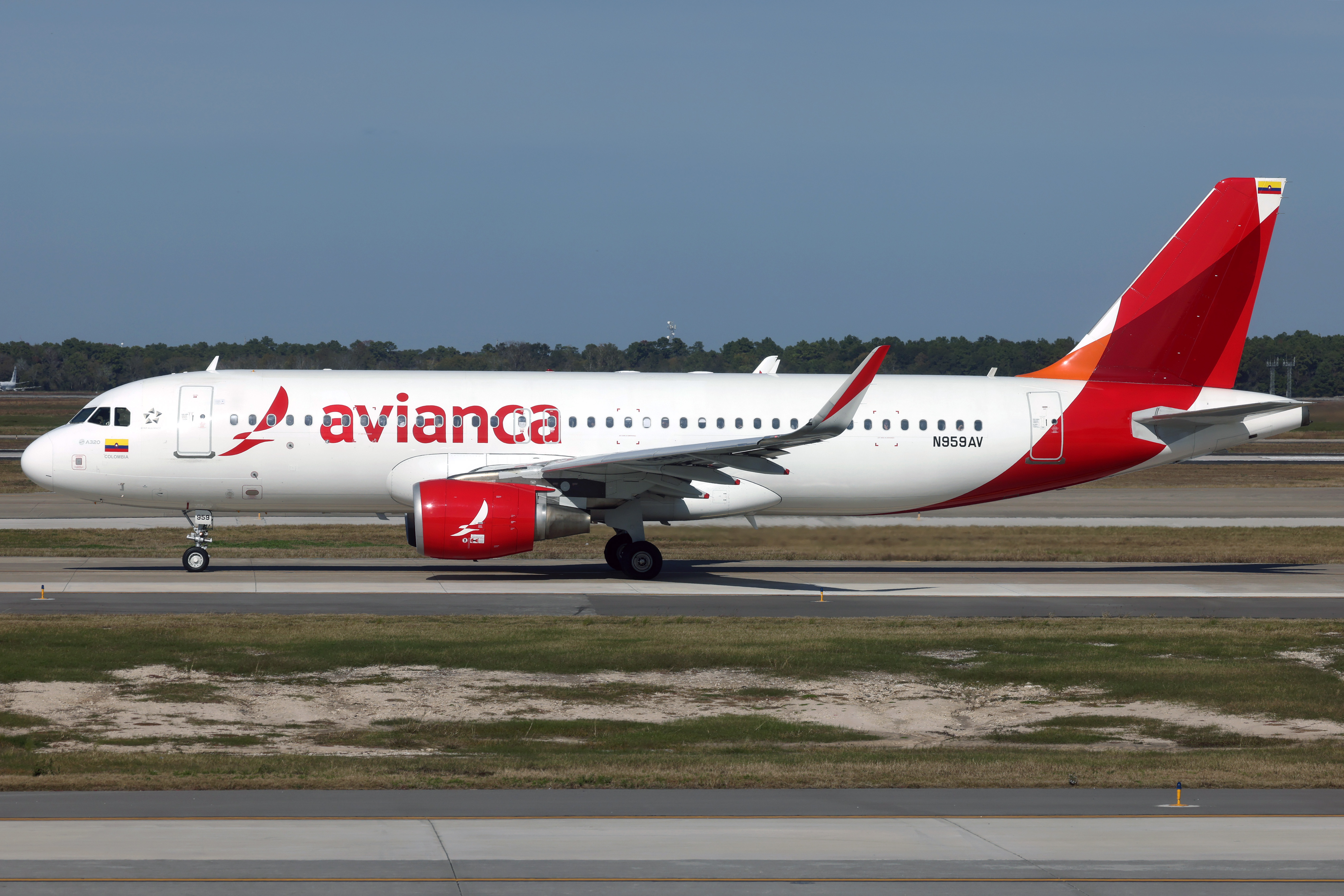
Airbus A320-200 at George Bush Intercontinental Airport in 2025

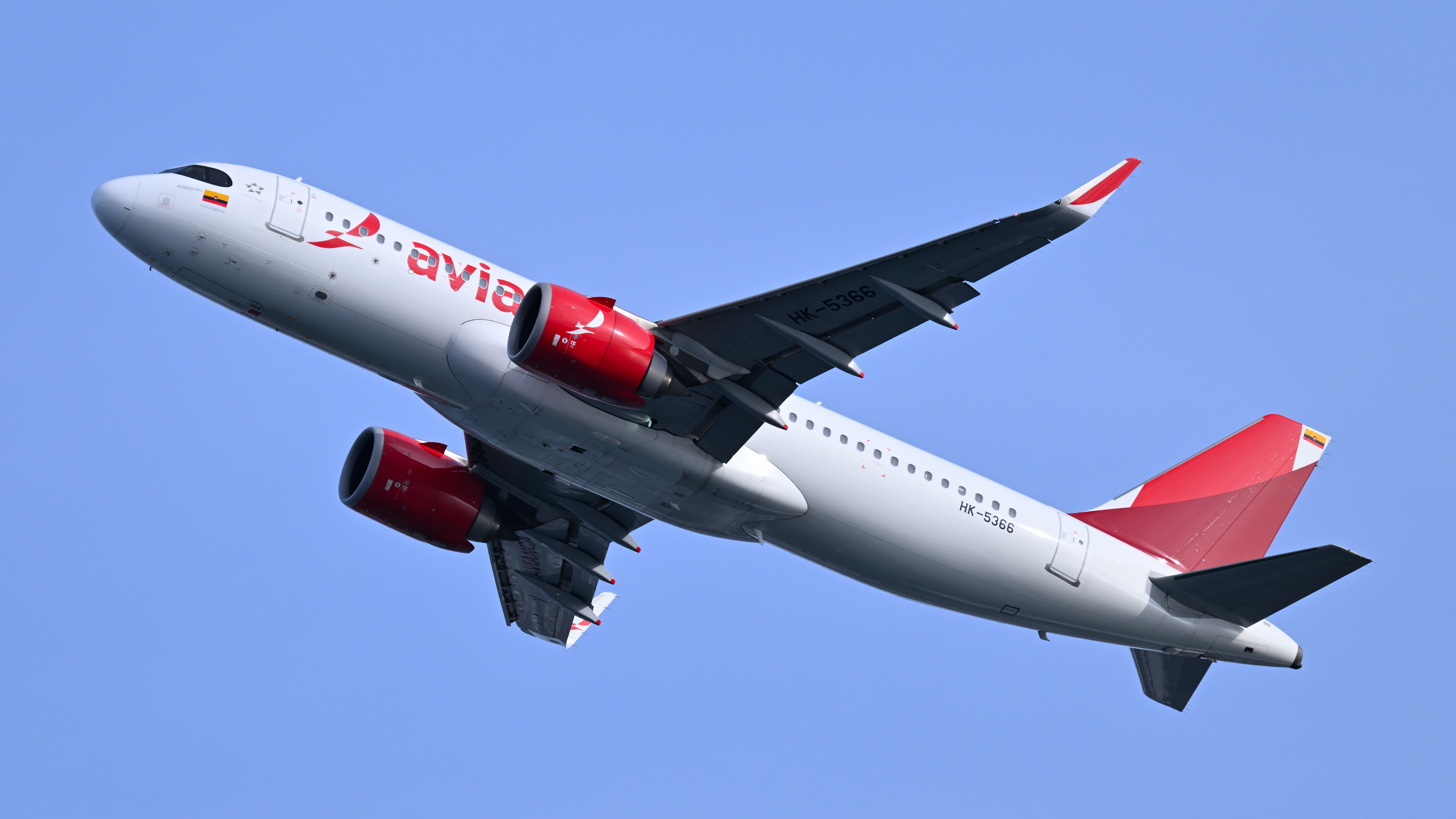
Airbus A320neo in 2025

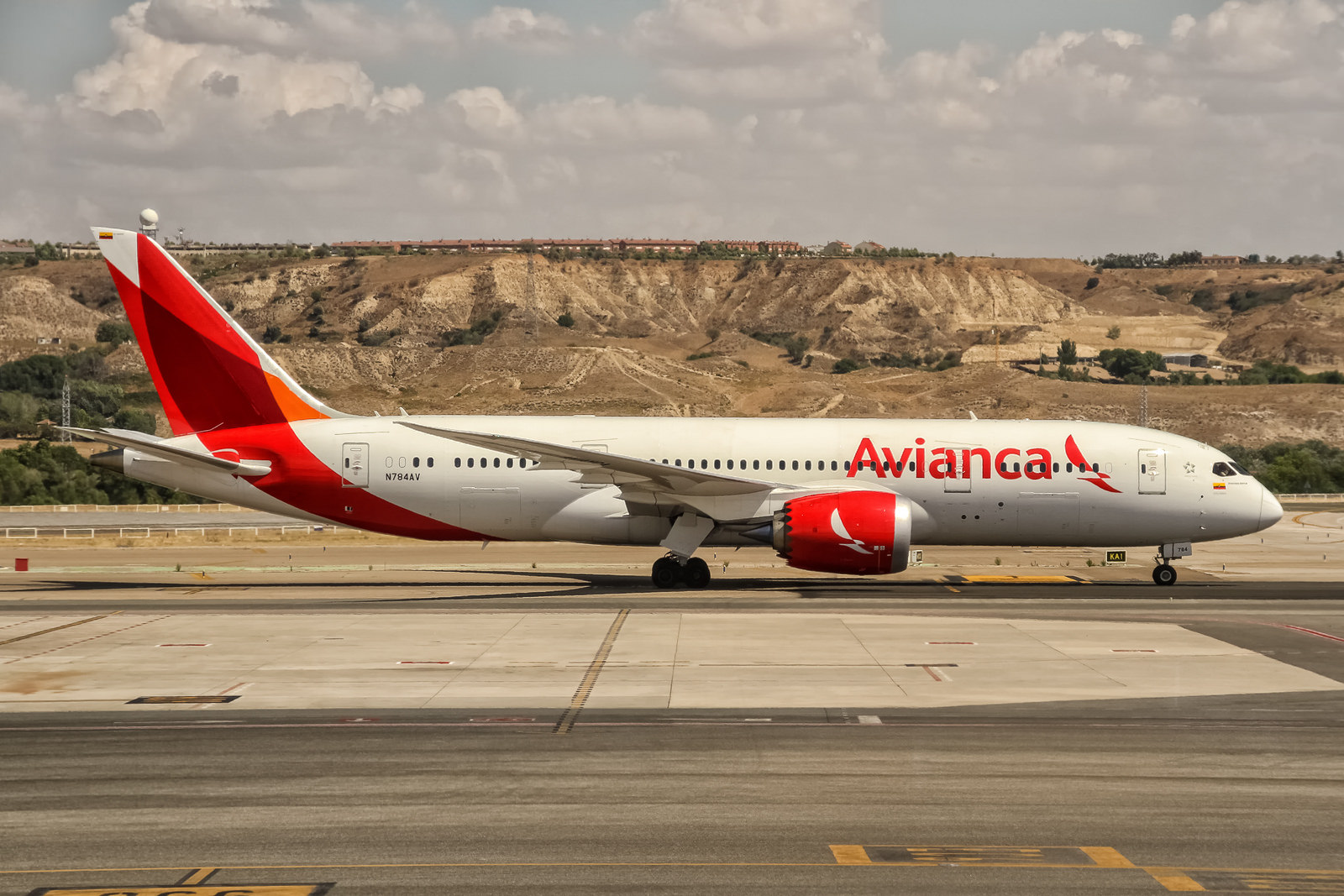
Boeing 787-8 taxiing at Adolfo Suárez Madrid–Barajas Airport in 2015

As of July 2026, Avianca operates the following aircraft:

Avianca fleet
Aircraft	In service	Orders	Passengers					Notes
Aircraft	In service	Orders	C	W	Y+	Y	Total	Notes
Airbus A319-100	8	—	–	12	48	84	144	Originally scheduled to be retired by 2024.
Airbus A320-200	47	—	–	12	60	108	180	
Airbus A320neo	31	88	–	12	60	108	180	Some orders are to be split with its subsidiaries.
Airbus A330-900	—	2	TBA					To be inherited from Azul Brazilian Airlines.
Boeing 787-8	13	—	20	–	36	235	291	
Boeing 787-8	3	—	32	–	–	259	291	Former Norwegian Long Haul aircraft.
Total	102	90						

=== Fleet development ===
In March 2007 the airline ordered 10 Boeing 787s. The first delivery of that aircraft type was on December 17, 2014, and its first service was on January 16, 2015, between Bogotá and New York City.

In 2015, Avianca signed an order for 100 A320neo family aircraft. At the beginning of March 2019, the airline had 20 A319neos, 92 A320neos, and 15 A321neos on order. In March 2019, the delivery of 17 Airbus A320neo family aircraft was cancelled, and deliveries of another 35 jets were rescheduled to 2026 to 2028, instead of 2020 to 2022.

In March 2022, the airline confirmed an order for 88 new A320neo with deliveries between 2025 and 2031.

In June 2023, it was reported that Avianca leased eight A320neos that belonged to the bankrupt airline Viva Air for delivery in 2023.

In September 2023, the airline announced plans to lease 14 Airbus A320neo and 2 A320ceo aircraft.

In February 2024, Avianca received one of the 3 Boeing 787-8s from Norwegian Air Shuttle. The airline said it wants to deviate from wet leases such as the one from Wamos Air and its A330; in addition, it wants to do it only with 787-8s owned by the company itself.

=== Former fleet ===
Since its founding, Avianca has operated a wide variety of aircraft:

Avianca former fleet
Aircraft	Total	Introduced	Retired	Notes
Airbus A318-100	10	2011	2019	Purchased from Mexicana
Airbus A321-200	9	2014	2021	
Airbus A321neo	2	2017	2020	
Airbus A330-200	12	2008	2023	
Airbus A330-300	2	2018	2020	Purchased from TransAsia Airways
ATR 72-600	9	2013	2019	Transferred to Avianca Express
Beechcraft 17	2	1941	1943	
Boeing 247D	18	1936	1948	
Boeing 707-120	1	1960	1961	Leased from Pan Am
Boeing 707-320C	8	1968	1994	One crashed as Flight 052
Boeing 720B	7	1961	1984	
Boeing 727-100	33	1966	1992	
Boeing 727-200	18	1978	1999	
Boeing 737-100	2	1968	1971	First 737 operator in Latin America
Boeing 747-100	3	1976	1996	
Boeing 747-100SF	2	1981	1988	
Boeing 747-200M	2	1979	1995	One crashed as Flight 011
Boeing 757-200	21	1992	2010	
Boeing 767-200ER	5	1990	2011	
Boeing 767-300ER	5	1994	2011	
Boeing 767-300ER	1	2014	2015	Leased from Omni Air International
Boeing 787-9	1	2019	2019	Delivered but never entered service
Consolidated PBY Catalina	4	1946	1956	
Curtiss T-32 Condor II	2	Unknown	Unknown	
Curtiss C-46 Commando	5	1949	1955	
de Havilland DH.60 Moth	7	1929	1939	
Dornier Do J Wal	3	1925	1932	
Dornier Merkur	2	1927	1932	
Douglas C-47 Skytrain	52	1939	1974	
Douglas C-54 Skymaster	26	1946	1975	
Douglas DC-2	2	1944	1947	
Douglas DC-3	4	1939	1973	
Douglas DC-4	2	1953	1974	
Fokker 50	10	1993	2014	One involved in a 1999 hijacking
Fokker 100	15	2006	2011	Operated by SAM until 2010
Fokker Universal	2	1929	1934	
Ford 5-AT-DS Trimotor	19	1929	1946	
General Aviation GA-43	1	1934	Unknown	
Hawker Siddeley HS 748	2	1968	1978	
IAI 1124 Westwind	1	1978	1995	Operated by Helicol
Junkers F 13	31	1920	1940	
Junkers W 33	1	1929	1932	
Junkers W 34	13	1928	1947	
Lockheed L-749A Constellation	6	1951	1967	
Lockheed L-1049E Super Constellation	4	1954	1969	
McDonnell Douglas MD-11ER	1	1998	1999	Leased from World Airways
McDonnell Douglas MD-83	18	1992	2011	
Sikorsky S-38	7	1929	1940	
Sikorsky S-41	1	1930	1936	

== Accidents and incidents ==
The airline suffered a few incidents during the 1980s and early 1990s. The deadliest of those incidents was Avianca Flight 011, which crashed in 1983.

- On January 22, 1947, a Douglas C-53B (registered C-108), crashed in the Magdalena River valley, killing all 17 people on board.
- On February 15, 1947, a Douglas DC-4 (registered C-114) crashed into El Tablazo Hill in the Bogotá savannah. All 53 occupants died. The accident was caused by human error, as the pilots were American nationals and had little knowledge of Colombian geography.
- On August 9, 1954, a Lockheed L-749A (registered HK-163), crashed three minutes after takeoff from Lajes Field, Azores, after it flew left into the hills instead of right towards the sea. All 30 on board died.
- On March 9, 1955, a Douglas C-47A (registered HK-328), crashed at Trujillo, Colombia, killing all eight on board. The wreckage was found a month later, but some of the gold and cargo were missing.
- On June 23, 1959, a Douglas DC-4 (registered HK-135), operating as Flight 667, struck Cerro Baco mountain while en route to Lima, Peru, killing all 14 aboard.
- On January 21, 1960, Avianca Flight 671, a Lockheed L-1049E, crashed and burned on landing at Sangster International Airport in Jamaica, killing 37 of the 46 aboard.
- On March 22, 1965, a Douglas C-47DL, (registered HK-109), operating Flight 676, struck Pan de Azucar at an elevation of 7,200 feet (2,200 m), killing all 29 on board. The cause was the decision of the pilot to fly VFR in conditions that required IFR.
- On October 17, 1965, a Douglas DC-3 (registered HK-118), operating Flight 676, coming from the city of Bogotá with 15 people on board collided in the air with a Piper Super Cub (registered HK-922), which had taken off from the old Gómez Niño airport of Bucaramanga all 16 occupants of both aircraft's were killed.
- On January 14, 1966, Avianca Flight 03 crashed shortly after takeoff from Rafael Núñez International Airport killing 56 of the 64 aboard. The cause was determined to be maintenance problems, possibly compounded by pilot error.
- On September 22, 1966, a Douglas DC-4 (registered HK-174), operating Flight 870, crashed while attempting to return to Eldorado Airport due to engine problems, killing both pilots. The cause was traced to a failure in the governor control unit. Improper supervision by the company was a contributing factor, as the pilot was briefed to make a night flight while he was in conversion training for the L-749.
- On December 24, 1966, a Douglas C-47A (registered HK-161), operating Flight 729, struck Cerro Las Animas at an elevation of 11,600 feet (3,500 m) while approaching Pasto, killing all 29 on board. A combination of poor CRM, pilot intoxication, deviation from route, and pilot error was cited as the cause.
- On 26 April 1967, a Douglas C-47DL (registered HK-326) crashed after takeoff from Alberto Lleras Camargo Airport, killing 17 of 18 onboard.
- On May 21, 1970, a Douglas DC-3, (registered HK-121), was hijacked to Yariguíes Airport, Barrancabermeja whilst on a flight from El Alcaraván Airport, Yopal to Alberto Lleras Camargo Airport, Sogamoso. The hijackers had demanded to be taken to Cuba.
- On July 29, 1972, two Douglas DC-3A, registered HK-107 and HK-1341, were involved in a mid-air collision over the Las Palomas Mountains. Both aircraft crashed, killing all 21 people on HK-107 and all 17 people on HK-1341. Both aircraft were operating domestic scheduled passenger flights from La Vanguardia Airport, Villavicencio to El Alcaraván Airport, Yopal.
- On July 5, 1973, a Hawker Siddeley HS-748 (registered HK-1408) skidded off the runway at the former Bucaramanga Gómez Niño Airport. After landing, the plane crashed into a house located at 63rd Street and 15B Avenue, coming very close to the Las Cocheras Canal chasm. All 44 on board survived but 3 people on the ground were killed.
- On August 22, 1973, a Douglas DC-3A (registered HK-111), crashed into a hill near the Casanare Department, killing 16 of the 17 people on board. The aircraft was operating a domestic scheduled passenger flight from La Vanguardia Airport, Villavicencio to El Alcaraván Airport, Yopal.
- On August 12, 1974, a Douglas C-47 (registered HK-508) flew into Trujillo Mountain, killing all 27 people on board. The aircraft was on a domestic scheduled passenger flight from El Dorado Airport, Bogotá to La Florida Airport, Tumaco.
- On November 27, 1983, Avianca Flight 011(1983), a Boeing 747-200M (registered HK-2910X) crashed into a mountain just short of landing at Madrid Barajas Airport in Madrid, killing 181 of the 192 people aboard. The cause was determined to be pilot error.
- On March 17, 1988, Avianca Flight 410, a Boeing 727-100 (registered HK-1716) crashed into low mountains near Cúcuta - Norte de Santander Department after take-off, killing all 143 on board. It was determined that pilot error was also the cause of this crash, in a situation similar to Flight 011.
- On November 27, 1989, a bomb destroyed Avianca Flight 203. All 107 passengers, crew, and 3 people on the ground were killed. The bombing had been ordered by Pablo Escobar to kill presidential candidate César Gaviria Trujillo. In the aftermath, it was discovered that Gaviria had not boarded the aircraft.
- On January 25, 1990, Avianca Flight 052, a Boeing 707-320C (registered HK-2016) en route from Bogotá to New York City via Medellín crashed in Cove Neck, New York, after running out of fuel while in a holding pattern for at New York's John F. Kennedy International Airport, killing 73 of the 158 people aboard.
- On April 26, 1990, 19th of April Movement presidential candidate Carlos Pizarro was gunned down during a domestic Avianca flight.
- On August 16, 1997, Avianca Flight 087, a Boeing 767-200ER en route from Bogotá to Buenos Aires Ezeiza, was diverted to Córdoba due to bad weather. However, upon approaching Córdoba, it was diverted again, and instructions from the tower directed the plane toward the mountains of the Córdoba mountain range. The 767 was running low on fuel at the time and ended up making an emergency landing in La Rioja, thanks to instructions from a pilot of a Southern Winds Airlines plane in flight.
- On April 12, 1999, Avianca Flight 9463, a Fokker 50 (registered PH-MXT), from Bogotá to Bucaramanga was hijacked by six ELN members, who forced the plane to make an emergency landing on a clandestine runway in the Bolívar Department. One passenger died during captivity, and the rest were eventually liberated a year after the hijacking.

== Awards and recognitions ==
In its recent history, the company has won different awards:

- 2010: E-Commerce Company of the Year – eCommerce Awards Colombia.
- 2012: Best Company in Customer Service Labor and Management – Ibero-American Social Media Awards.
- 2013: Best Company in Customer Service Labor and Management – Ibero-American Social Media Awards.
- 2013: South American Airlines with Best Onboard Service – Skytrax World Airline Awards.
- 2014: Best E-commerce Initiative in Colombia – Colombia Online Awards.
- 2015: Best Airline in South America – World Travel Awards.
- 2016: Best Airline in South America and Latin America – Business Traveler North America Magazine.
- 2017: Best Airline in South America – Business Traveler Awards.
- 2017: Best Airline in South America and Best Regional Airline in South America – Skytrax World Airline Awards.
- 2017: Best Mobile Initiative for eCommerce – eCommerce Awards.
- 2017: Second-best airline in the world – Consumers and Users Organization.
- 2018: Best Airline in South America – Skytrax World Airline Awards.
- 2018: Best Regional Airline in South America – Airline Passenger Experience APEX.

== See also ==
- List of airlines of Colombia
