= Avianca Flight 03 =

1966 aviation accident

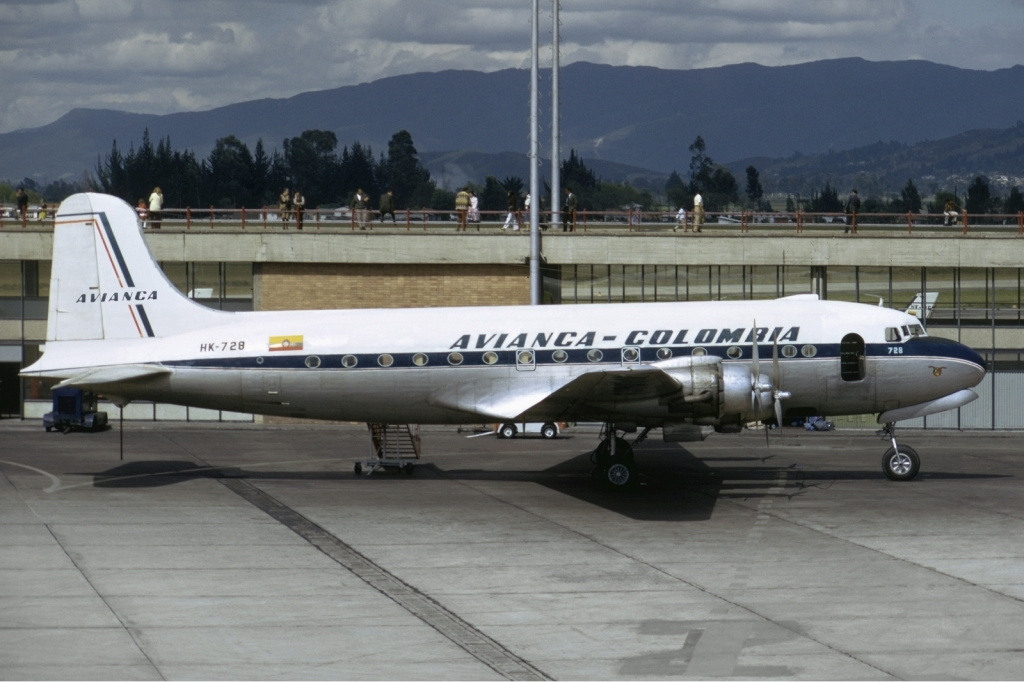
- An Avianca Douglas C-54, similar to the one involved.

Accident
- Date: January 14, 1966
- Summary: Stall following false fire alarm and subsequent pilot error.
- Site: Off Cartagena, Colombia

Aircraft
- Aircraft type: Douglas C-54
- Operator: Avianca
- Registration: HK-730
- Flight origin: Cartagena-Crespo Airport, Cartagena, Colombia
- Destination: El Dorado International Airport, Bogotá, Colombia
- Passengers: 60
- Crew: 4
- Fatalities: 56
- Survivors: 8

Avianca Flight 03 was a passenger flight from Cartagena, Colombia, to Bogotá, Colombia, that crashed on January 14, 1966. After takeoff, as the aircraft reached 100 ft (30 m), it stalled and crashed into shallow water. After a 14-month investigation, engine failure was found to be a possible, but unproven, cause. Poor maintenance and inadequate inspections were also suspected.

== Aircraft ==
The aircraft involved was a Douglas C-54, the military version of the Douglas DC-4 produced during World War II, registered HK-730 to Avianca. The aircraft involved was produced in 1944; because of military needs, it was equipped with larger fuel tanks, which allowed for intercontinental passenger flights.

== Sequence of events ==
At 20:50 on January 14, the aircraft was cleared for takeoff. The plane reached 70 feet (21 meters) after rotation, but then began to descend. It then crashed into the sea 1,300 meters from the airport runway. Out of the 64 people aboard, only 8 survived.
