= Avianca Flight 9463 =

1999 aircraft hijacking

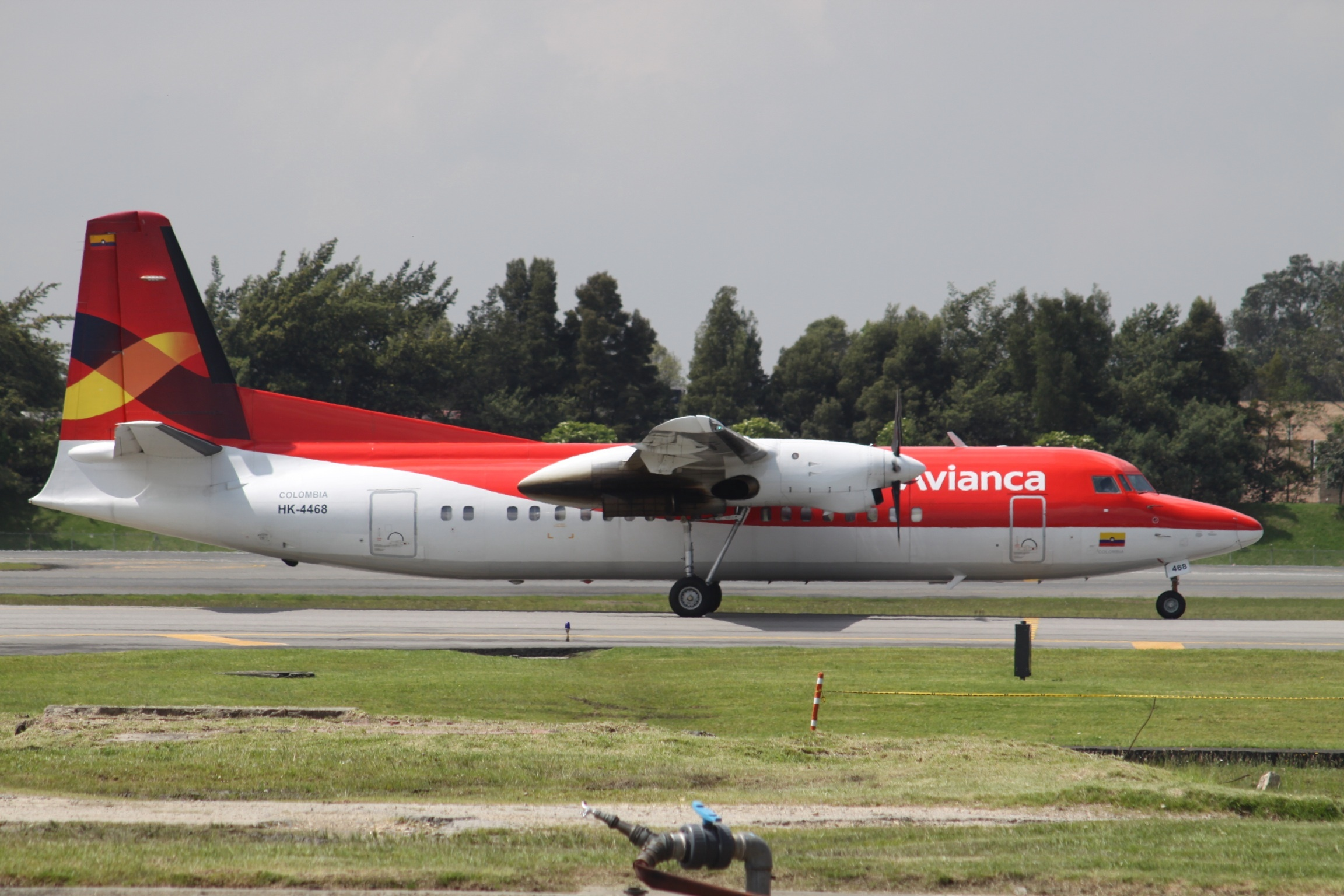
- HK-4468, the aircraft involved in the hijacking

Hijacking
- Date: April 12, 1999
- Summary: Aircraft hijacking and Extortion
- Site: Colombia

Aircraft
- Aircraft type: Fokker 50
- Operator: Avianca
- Call sign: AVIANCA 9463
- Registration: HK-4468
- Flight origin: Palonegro International Airport, Bucaramanga
- Destination: El Dorado International Airport, Bogotá
- Occupants: 46
- Passengers: 41
- Crew: 5
- Fatalities: 1
- Injuries: 0
- Survivors: 45

Avianca Flight 9463 was a scheduled domestic passenger flight from Bucaramanga to Bogotá in Colombia. On April 12, 1999, a Fokker 50 operating the route was hijacked by a command of six guerrillas from the National Liberation Army (ELN). The aircraft was carrying 41 passengers and five crew members.

== Hijacking ==
Avianca Flight 9463 was operating a route between the cities of Bucaramanga and Bogotá when at approximately 10:30 AM seven armed men rose out of their seats and identified themselves as members of the National Liberation Army (ELN). The Colombian authorities became aware of the hijacking at around 12:30 noon. The hijackers demanded that the passengers assume the emergency brace position and not lift their heads. Once the cabin was under control, one of the hijackers entered the cockpit with a gun, and forced the captain of the aircraft out of the cockpit. The hijacker then forced the first officer to divert the aircraft to a clandestine landing strip called "Los Sábalos", located in the village of El Piñal, district of Vijagual, between the municipalities of Simití and San Pablo in the south of the department of Bolívar.

Once on the ground, the hijackers got off the plane and proceeded to wait next to the aircraft, while another group of ELN guerrillas from the "Heroes de Santa Rosa" group took the passengers and crew off the aircraft. Among the passengers were a baby and several elderly people. They proceeded to take the passengers of the aircraft into the surrounding jungle and subsequently floated them down a river where after they were transferred to a camp where they remained until their release.

== Releases ==
One day after the hijacking, the ELN hijackers released the baby and five elderly people thanks to negotiations with Red Cross delegate, Ernesto Herrera Calderon. Calderon acted as the facilitator and neutral intermediary for the negotiations. On April 15, 1999, the hijackers released three more people who had health conditions. On May 7, four more people were released. Hostages were released gradually until November 22, 2000, on which the last hostage, Gloria Amaya de Alfonso, was released. During the ordeal, one person died: Carlos Gustavo González. The organisation of their release was initially managed by journalist and comedian Jaime Garzón who had previously been a mediator for the release of 100 people kidnapped by the FARC-EP a year earlier. Garzón, met with leaders of the ELN in the Itagüí prison to expedite the release of the hostages, but these mediations were cut short, since the journalist was killed by paramilitaries accusing him of trying to profit off the hostages, as well as other incidents.

== Court Proceedings ==
The Supreme Court of Justice of Colombia ratified the decision of the Second Criminal Court of the Bucaramanga Circuit of May 16, 2005. The sentence condemned the hijackers, Luis Eduardo Galvis Rivera, William Ricardo Blanco Suárez and Héctor Dante Becerra Salazar to 37, 36 and 36 years in prison, respectively, for the crimes of aggravated extortive kidnapping, seizure and diversion of aircraft, material falsehood in public documents and destruction, suppression and concealment of public documents. Blanco and Becerra were sentenced for destruction, suppression and concealment of a public document, in addition to a fine of $1,199 pesos and the inability to hold public office and functions for up to 10 years.

José María Ballestas was also found guilty for the hijacking, who was in Venezuela at the time of the verdict. Ballestas was later extradited to Colombia, where he was convicted. Also the hijackers Herlinto Chamorro Acosta, alias "Antonio García", Israel Ramírez Pineda, alias "Pablo Beltrán, and Ever Castillo Sumaleva, alias "El Gallero" were convicted as well.

On September 12, 2007, the last hijacker was captured in the Los Olivos neighborhood of Barranquilla, María Orlinda Guerrero, alias "La Negra Yesenia" whom the Colombian authorities accused of being the ringleader of the Frente de guerra Darío de Jesús Ramírez Castro. Guerrero was accused of planning the hijacking of the aircraft.

== See also ==
- Colombian conflict
- Air France Flight 8969
- Indian Airlines Flight 814
