= 1947 Avianca Douglas DC-4 crash =

1947 aviation accident in Colombia

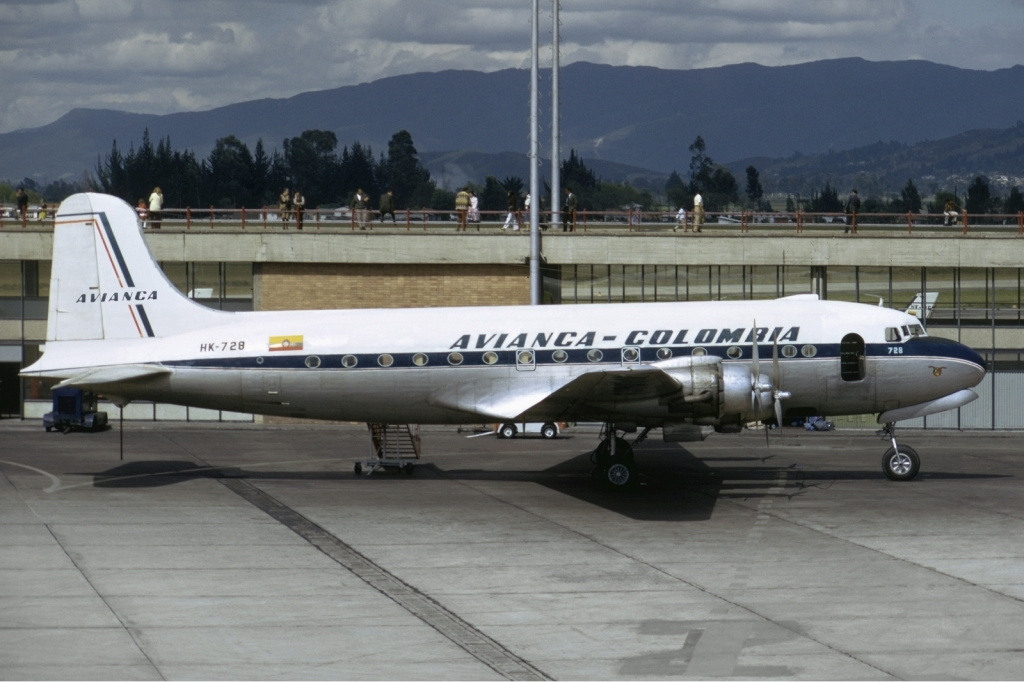
- An Avianca DC-4, similar to the accident aircraft

Accident
- Date: 15 February 1947
- Summary: CFIT due to pilot/navigation error
- Site: Mount El Tablazo, near Bogotá, Colombia; 5°00′48″N 74°12′05″W

Aircraft
- Aircraft type: Douglas DC-4
- Operator: Avianca
- Registration: C-114
- Flight origin: Ernesto Cortissoz International Airport, Barranquilla
- Destination: Techo International Airport, Bogotá
- Passengers: 49
- Crew: 4
- Fatalities: 53
- Survivors: 0

On 15 February 1947, an Avianca Douglas DC-4, operating a scheduled domestic passenger flight from Ernesto Cortissoz International Airport to Techo International Airport, Colombia, crashed into a mountain two hours into its flight, killing all 53 occupants on board. At the time, it was both the deadliest aviation accident in Colombia and the deadliest worldwide involving a commercial aircraft.

== Background ==
=== Aircraft ===
The aircraft involved in the accident was Douglas DC-4 registered as C-114. It was powered by four Pratt & Whitney R-2000 Twin Wasp engines. Avianca, the operator of the aircraft, was at the time the Colombian subsidiary of Pan Am.

=== Passengers and crew ===
The aircraft was carrying 49 passengers and 4 crew members. The crew consisted of captain Kenneth Newton Poe and first officer Roy Kaye who was also acting as a radio operator – both of whom were Americans, and flight attendants Aida Chufji from Costa Rica and Carlos Rodríguez.

Among the passengers were high-ranking executives of the Colombia's oil companies. These included a British citizen and five American executives of Tropical Oil Company – a then-subsidiary of Imperial Oil Company of Canada, Texas Petroleum and United Artists, as well as a Canadian and a Frenchman who were both executives of Tropical Oil Company. Also on board was a Colombian attorney for Tropical Oil Company, and Colombian footballer Romelio Martínez and his son.

== Aftermath ==
Four hours after the crash, Colombia's Ministry of War informed Techo International Airport of the accident after a delay. According to the mayor of Supatá, a farmer who had witnessed the crash reported that he had seen "...a crash of shattered metal and an explosion like something from another world."
