= Gran Estación =

Gran Estacion Mall
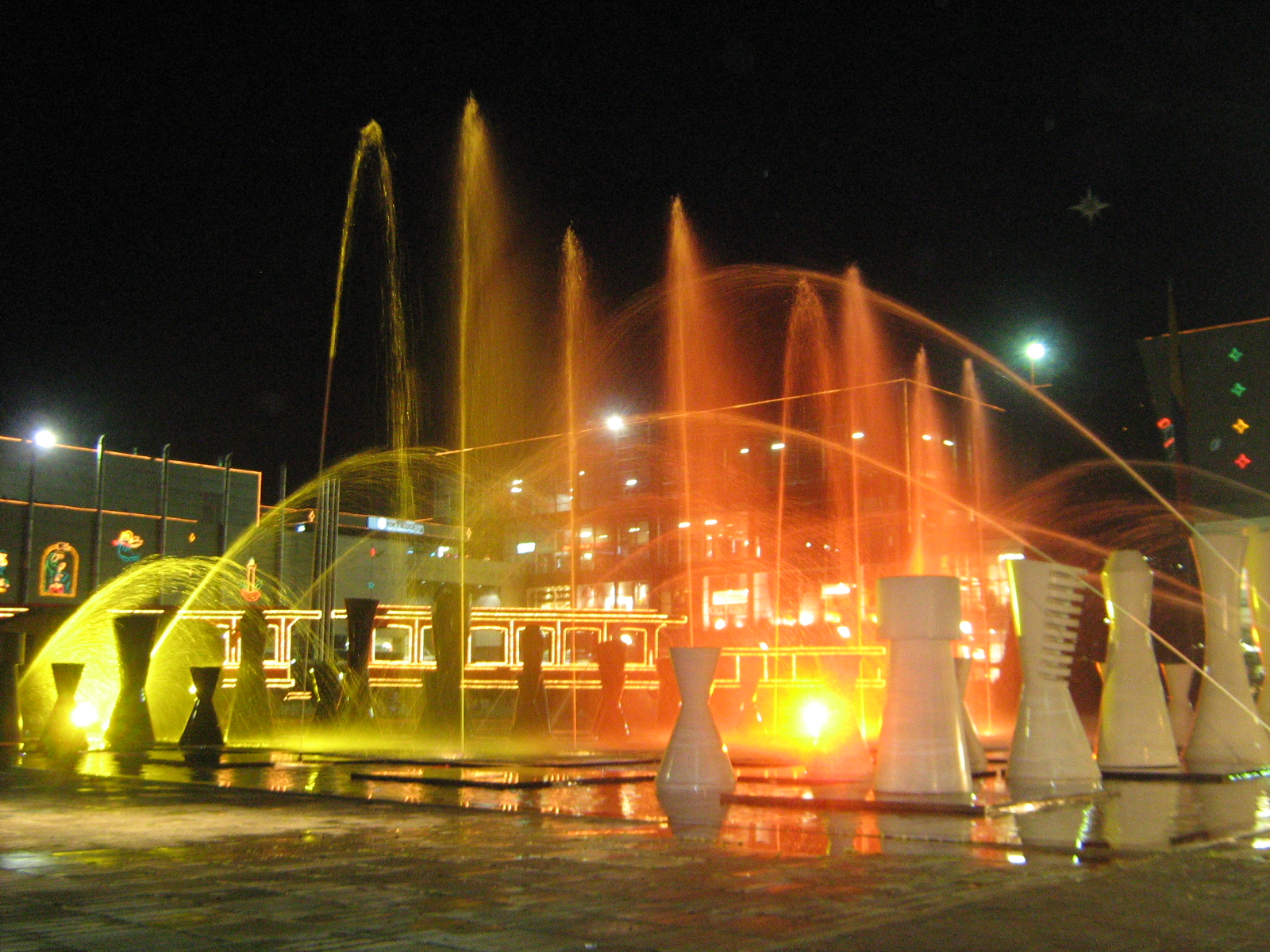
- Location: Bogotá, Colombia
- Coordinates: 4°38′52″N 74°06′05″W
- Address: Av. Calle 26 # 62-47
- Opened: December 1, 2006
- Num. of stores: 374
- Num. of anchor tenants: 3
- Floors: 4
- Parking: 2,079

Gran Estación is a shopping mall located in the Ciudad Salitre in Bogotá, Colombia. It opened its doors on December 1, 2006. The mall is the fourth biggest mall in Colombia and is also one of the biggest in South America.

The mall opened its doors on December 1, 2006 elaborate architecture spanning more than 160,000 square metres (1,700,000 sq ft), including delivery to the city access roads and a public square of 12 thousand square meters. It is located less than 10 minutes from El Dorado International Airport. The mall contains 374 shops, 2,079 parking spaces for cars (69 for disabled), free wi-fi, arcade, bowling, casino, theatre with eight screens movie theatre 3D & 2D. It has the first Starbucks opened inside a mall in Colombia.

The mall consists of two buildings - El Costado Esfera and El Costado Alfiles that are connected by metallic bridge.

== Anchor Stores and Restaurants ==
Some of the most important stores within the mall are Almacenes Éxito, Cine Colombia, and Pepe Ganga.

Among the most important restaurants are Crepes & Waffles, El Corral, McDonalds, and KFC.
