= Tartagal, Chaco =

Coordinates: 24°13′18″S 62°08′52″W

Tartagal (Chaco)
- Municipality and village
- Interactive map of Tartagal (Chaco)
- Country: Argentina
- Province: Chaco Province
- Time zone: UTC−3 (ART)

Tartagal is a village and municipality in Chaco Province in northern Argentina.
