= Aerodrome =

Location from which aircraft flight operations take place

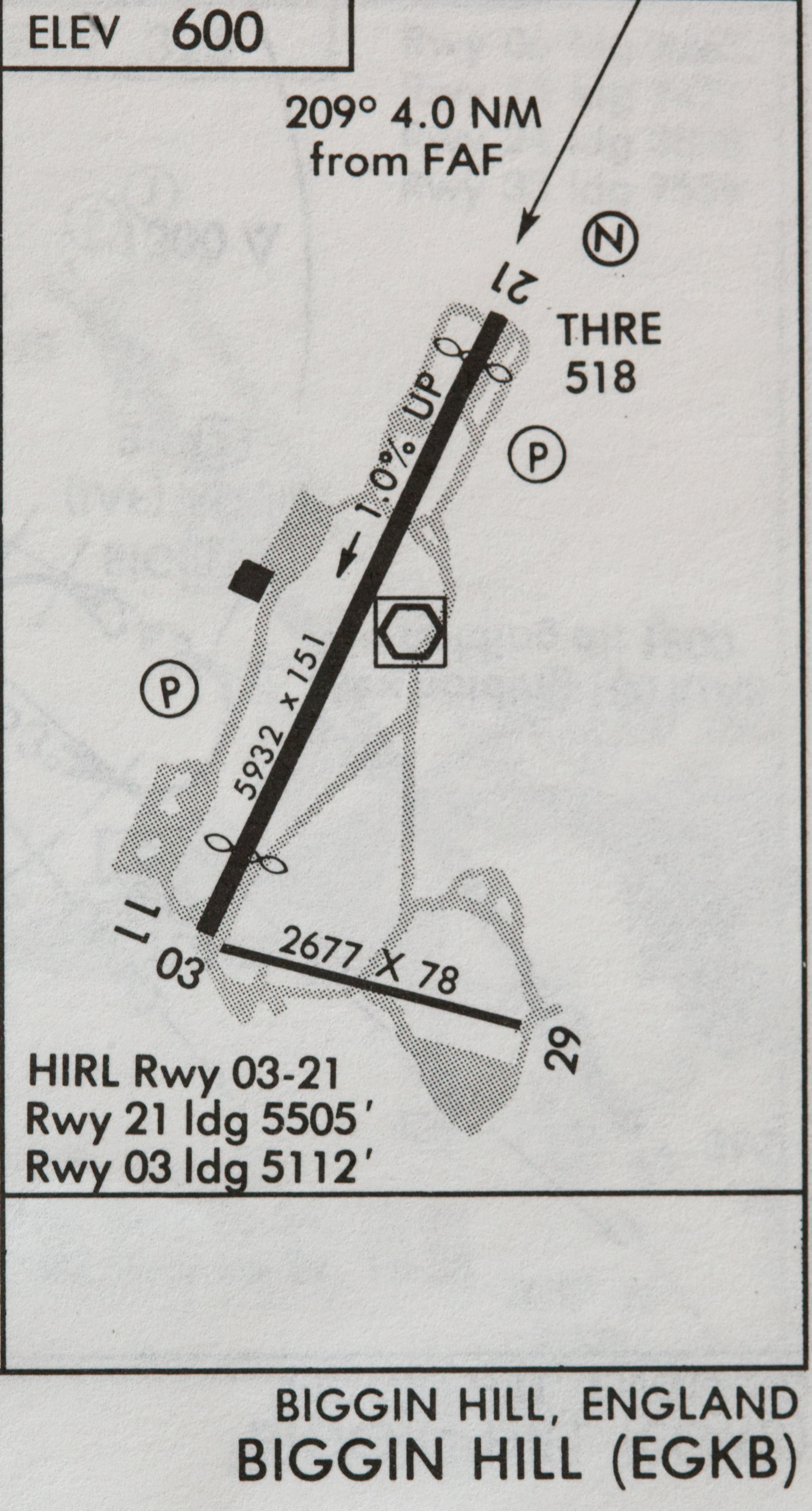
Airport diagram for London Biggin Hill

An aerodrome, airfield, or airstrip is a location from which aircraft flight operations take place, regardless of whether they involve air cargo, passengers, or neither, and regardless of whether it is for public or private use. Aerodromes include small general aviation airfields, large commercial airports, and military air bases.

The term airport may imply a certain stature (having satisfied certain certification criteria or regulatory requirements) that not all aerodromes have achieved. That means that all airports are aerodromes, but not all aerodromes are airports. Aerodrome and airfield are more common in Commonwealth English and rare in American English, where airport is applied almost exclusively.

A water aerodrome is an area of open water used regularly by seaplanes, floatplanes or amphibious aircraft for landing and taking off.

In formal terminology, as defined by the International Civil Aviation Organization (ICAO), an aerodrome is "a defined area on land or water (including any buildings, installations, and equipment) intended to be used either wholly or in part for the arrival, departure, and surface movement of aircraft."

== Etymology ==
The word aerodrome derives from Ancient Greek ἀήρ (aḗr), air, and δρόμος (drómos), road or course, literally meaning air course. An ancient linguistic parallel is hippodrome (a stadium for horse racing and chariot racing), derived from ἵππος (híppos), horse, and δρόμος (drómos), course. A modern linguistic parallel is velodrome, an arena for velocipedes. Αεροδρόμιο is the word for airport in Modern Greek, which transliterates as aerodromio.

In British military usage, the Royal Flying Corps in the First World War, and the Royal Air Force in the First and Second World Wars, used the term—it had the advantage that their French allies, on whose soil they were often based, and with whom they co-operated, used the cognate term aérodrome.

In Canada and Australia, aerodrome is a legal term of art for any area of land or water used for aircraft operation, regardless of facilities.

International Civil Aviation Organization (ICAO) documents use the term aerodrome, for example, in the Annex to the ICAO Convention about aerodromes, their physical characteristics, and their operation. However, the terms airfield or airport mostly superseded use of aerodrome after the Second World War, in colloquial language.

== History ==
An airfield traffic pattern

In the early days of aviation, when there were no paved runways and all landing fields were grass, a typical airfield might permit takeoffs and landings in only a couple of directions, much like today's airports, whereas an aerodrome was distinguished, by virtue of its much greater size, by its ability to handle landings and takeoffs in any direction. The ability to always take off and land directly into the wind, regardless of the wind's direction, was an important advantage in the earliest days of aviation when an aeroplane's performance in a crosswind takeoff or landing might be poor or even dangerous. The development of differential braking in aircraft, improved aircraft performance, utilisation of paved runways, and the fact that a circular aerodrome required much more space than did the L- or triangle-shaped airfield, eventually made the early aerodromes obsolete.

The unimproved airfield remains a phenomenon in military aspects. The DHC-4 Caribou served in the United States military in Vietnam (designated as the CV-2), landing on rough, unimproved airfields where the C-130 Hercules workhorse could not operate. Earlier, the Ju 52 and Fieseler Storch could do the same, one example of the latter taking off from the Führerbunker whilst completely surrounded by Soviet troops.

== Types ==
=== Airport ===
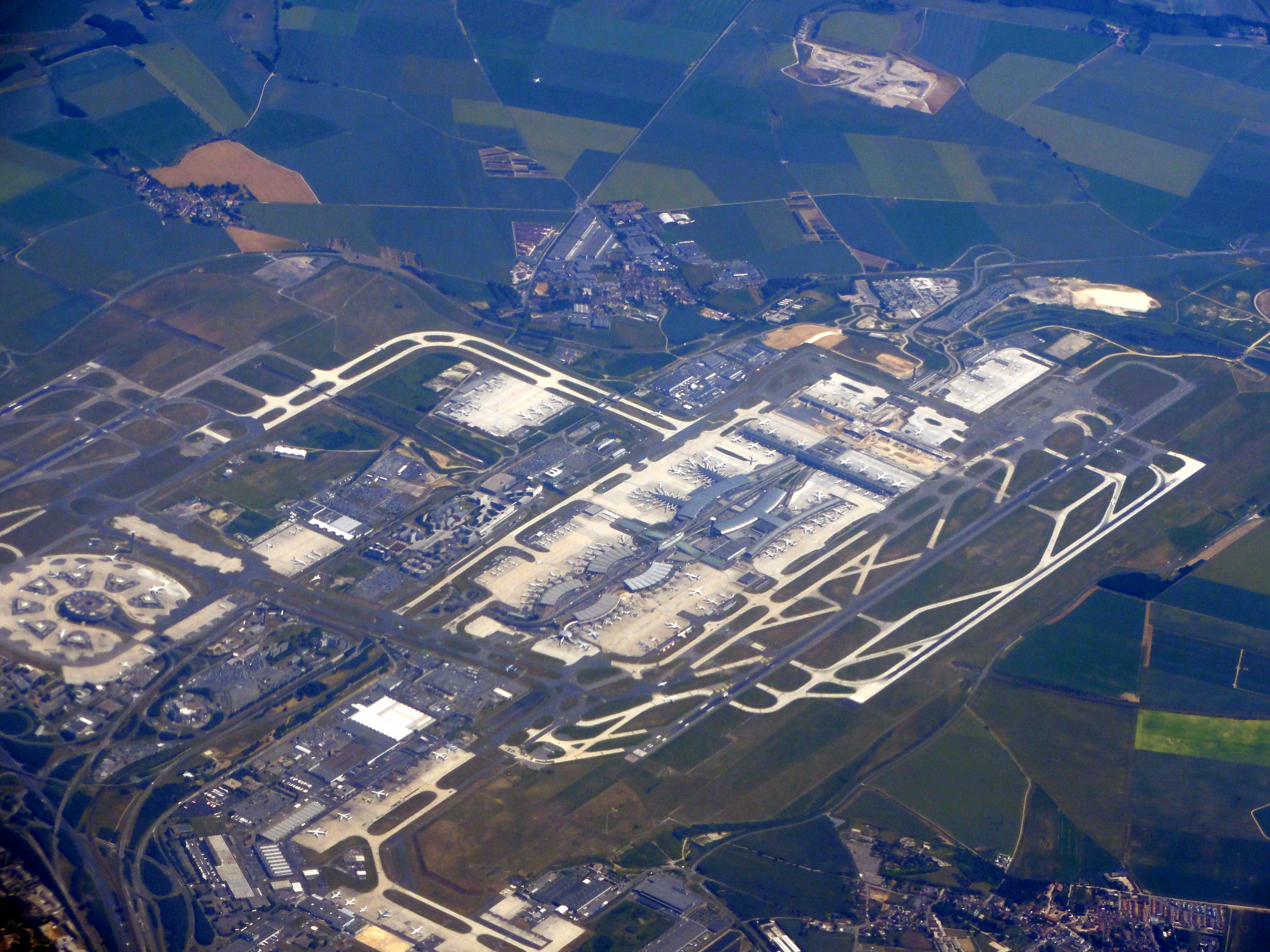
Aerial view of Charles de Gaulle Airport, Paris

In colloquial use in certain environments, the terms airport and aerodrome are often interchanged. However, in general, the term airport may imply or confer a certain stature upon the aviation facility that other aerodromes may not have achieved. In some jurisdictions, airport is a legal term of art reserved exclusively for those aerodromes certified or licensed as airports by the relevant civil aviation authority after meeting specified certification criteria or regulatory requirements.

=== Air base ===
An air base is an aerodrome with significant facilities to support aircraft and crew. The term is usually reserved for military bases, but also applies to civil seaplane bases. Some airbases, such as CFB Comox / Comox Airport, are classified as joint-use airports in that there are scheduled flights as well as military operations.

=== Airstrip ===
An airstrip is a small aerodrome that consists only of a runway with perhaps fuelling equipment. They are generally in remote locations, e.g. Airstrips in Tanzania. Many airstrips (now mostly abandoned) were built on the hundreds of islands in the Pacific Ocean during the Second World War. A few airstrips grew to become full-fledged airbases as the strategic or economic importance of a region increased over time.

An advanced landing ground was a temporary airstrip used by the Allies in the run-up to and during the invasion of Normandy, and these were built both in Britain, and on the continent.

=== Airpark ===
An airpark, or air park, is a small aerodrome that is built to be used by private aircraft serving a business or residential lot. A residential airpark is a "fly-in community" specifically designed around an airport where the residents own aeroplanes which they park in their hangars, usually attached to or integrated into their homes.

=== Altiport ===
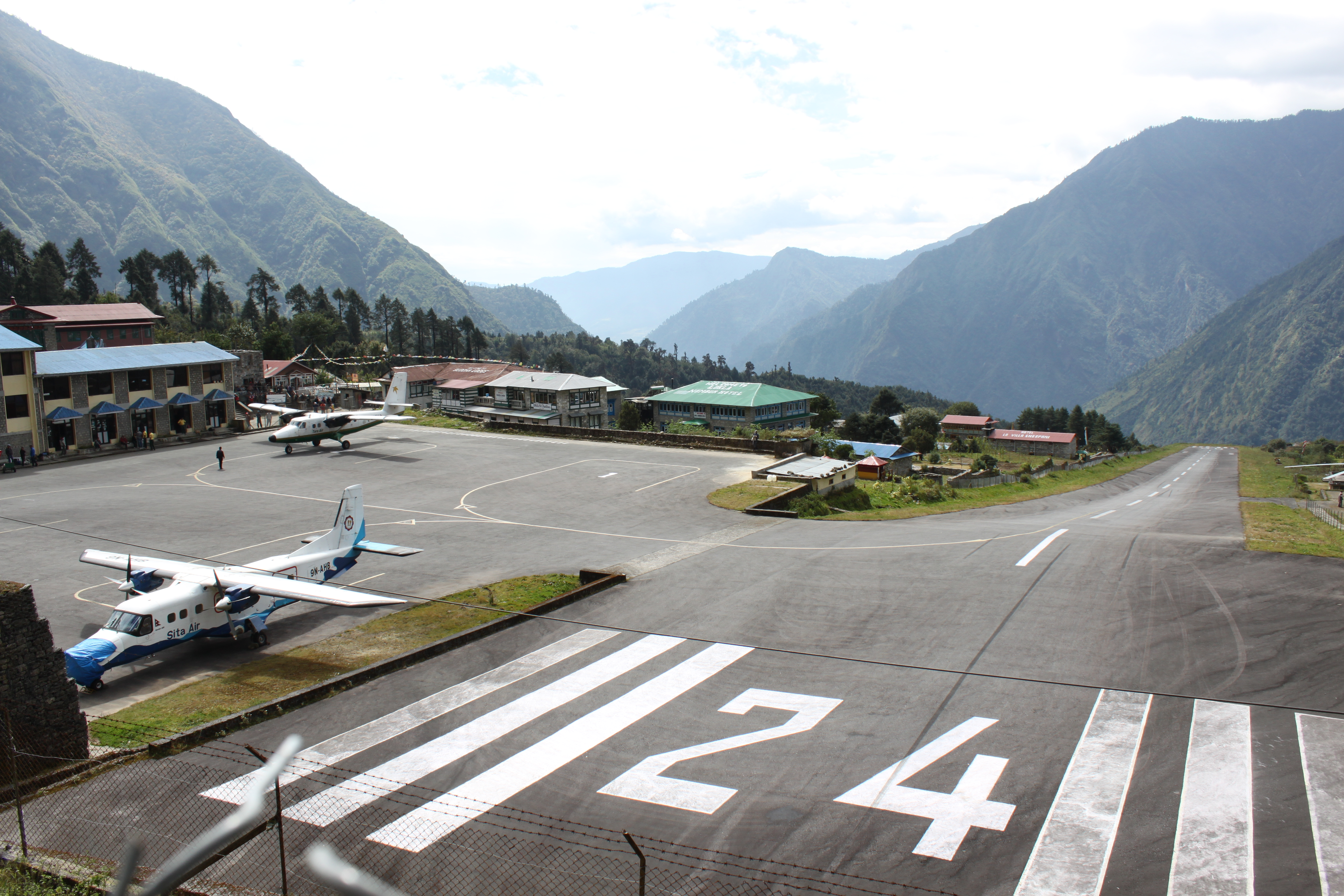
Tenzing-Hillary Airport, or Lukla Airport, Nepal

An altiport is an aerodrome for small aircraft and helicopters, situated on or within mountainous terrain. Altiports are generally characterised by having a runway with an atypical slope to fit in the local topography. Ultimately, this slope helps aircraft decelerating when landing and assists acceleration during takeoff. High altitude results in less lift available to aircraft wings, which requires aircraft to achieve higher speed at takeoff and landing. Such airfields with unusual physical characteristics are frequent in regions such as the French Alps, Himalayan regions, as well as Pacific islands.

=== Heliport ===
A heliport is an aerodrome which has a helipad, suitable for use by helicopters, powered lift, and various types of vertical lift aircraft. Designated heliports typically contain one or more touchdown and liftoff areas and may also have limited facilities such as fuel or hangars. In some larger towns and cities, customs facilities may also be available. The broader term vertiport refers to sites for all aircraft taking off and landing vertically.

=== STOLport ===
A STOLport, or STOLPORT, was an airport designed with STOL (short take-off and landing) operations in mind, usually for an aircraft class of a certain weight and size. A STOLport usually has a short single runway, generally shorter than 1,500 m (5,000 ft). STOLports are only usable by certain types of aircraft, especially smaller propeller aircraft, with performance compatible with the shorter runway length, steeper approach and departure paths, etc. at individual STOLports.

=== Water aerodrome ===
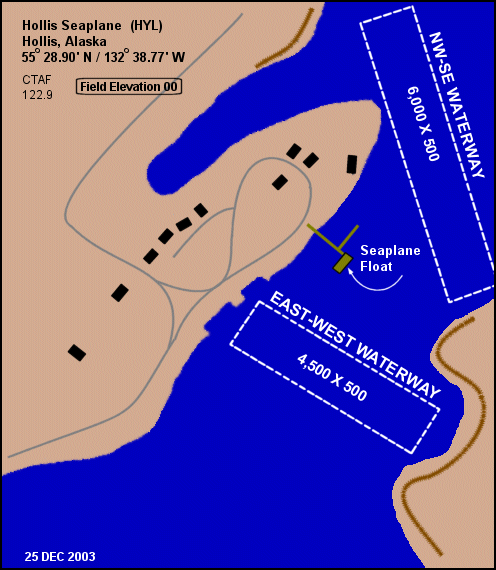
A diagram of the Hollis Seaplane Base located in Hollis, Alaska

A water aerodrome, or seaplane base, is an area of open water used regularly by seaplanes, floatplanes and amphibious aircraft for landing and taking off. It may have a terminal building on land and/or a place where the plane can come to shore and dock like a boat to load and unload (for example, Yellowknife Water Aerodrome). Some are co-located with a land based airport and are certified airports in their own right. These include Vancouver International Water Airport and Vancouver International Airport. Others, such as Vancouver Harbour Flight Centre have their own control tower, Vancouver Harbour Control Tower.

Initially following the invention of the seaplane, traditional boat docks were typically used as there was little need for purpose-built facilities. This would later change, however, as commercial seaplane operations proved financially viable, leading many companies, most notably Pan American Airways, to push for the construction of seaplane bases that were optimised for such use. These new seaplane bases often featured terminal buildings for passengers and cargo, concrete ramps for amphibious aircraft, and floating docks that connected to land. Seaplane bases would end up becoming very heavily utilised for commercial air traffic for a number of years, but they eventually fell out of favour as land based aircraft rose in prominence. Advances in aircraft technology following World War II resulted in the development of land based aircraft that were capable of travelling greater distances, thus relegating seaplane bases to secondary use by about the 1950s. Although their commercial use has generally fallen out of the mainstream, many seaplane bases in remote areas still have commercial service as a means of providing easier access. Other bases still exist for general aviation use as well.

== By country ==
=== Canada ===
The Canadian Aeronautical Information Manual says "...for the most part, all of Canada can be an aerodrome", however, there are also "registered aerodromes" and "certified airports". To become a registered aerodrome, the operator must maintain certain standards and keep the Minister of Transport informed of any changes. To be certified as an airport the aerodrome, which usually supports commercial operations, must meet safety standards. Nav Canada, the private company responsible for air traffic control services in Canada, publishes the Canada Flight Supplement, a directory of all registered Canadian land aerodromes, as well as the Canada Water Aerodrome Supplement (CWAS).

=== Republic of Ireland ===
Casement Aerodrome is the main military airport used by the Irish Air Corps. The term aerodrome is used for airports and airfields of lesser importance in Ireland, such as those at Abbeyshrule; Bantry; Birr; Inisheer; Inishmaan; Inishmore; Newcastle, County Wicklow; and Trim.

== Gallery ==
Aerodromes
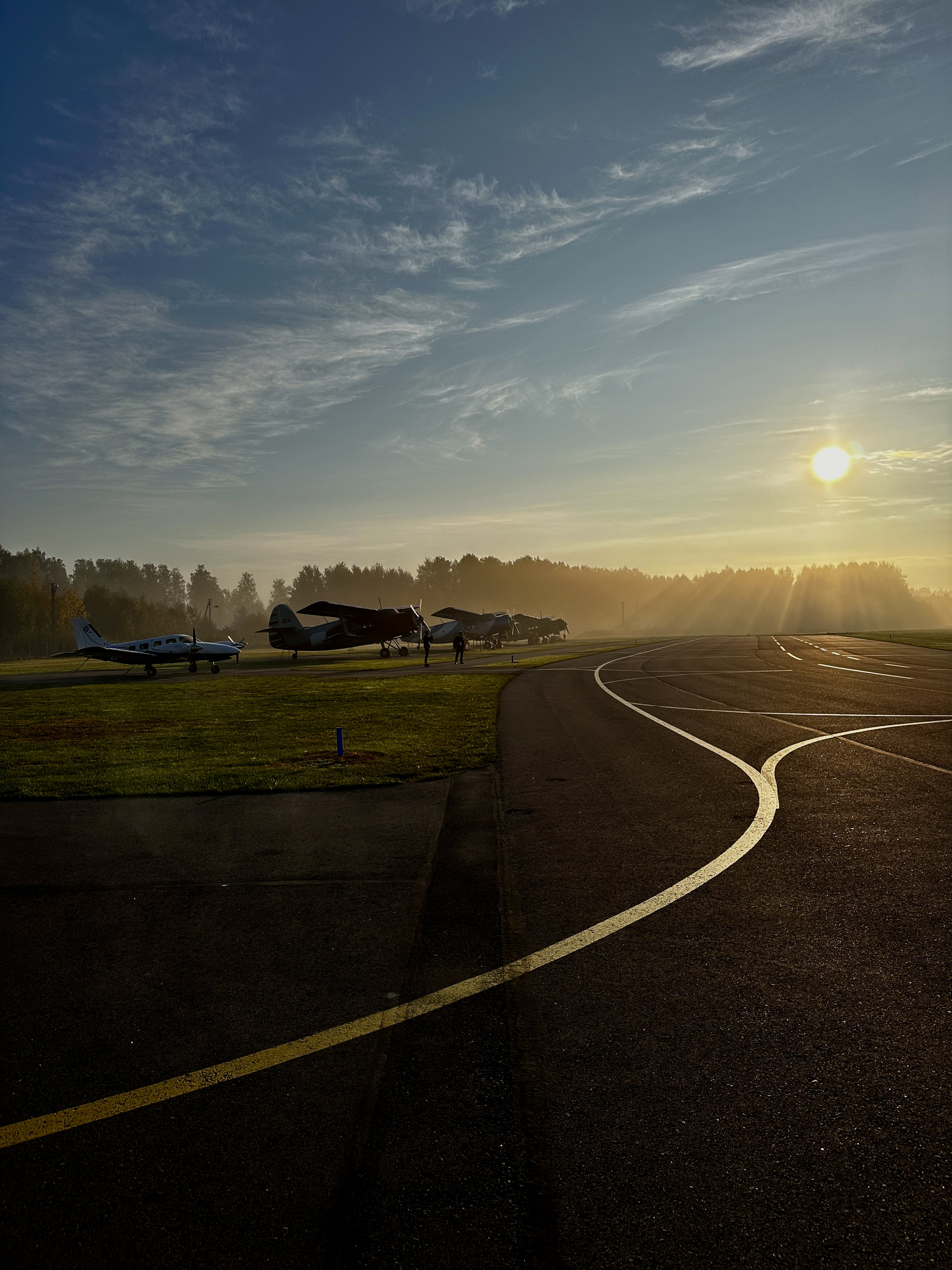
Sunrise at Kyviškės Airfield in Vilnius, Lithuania

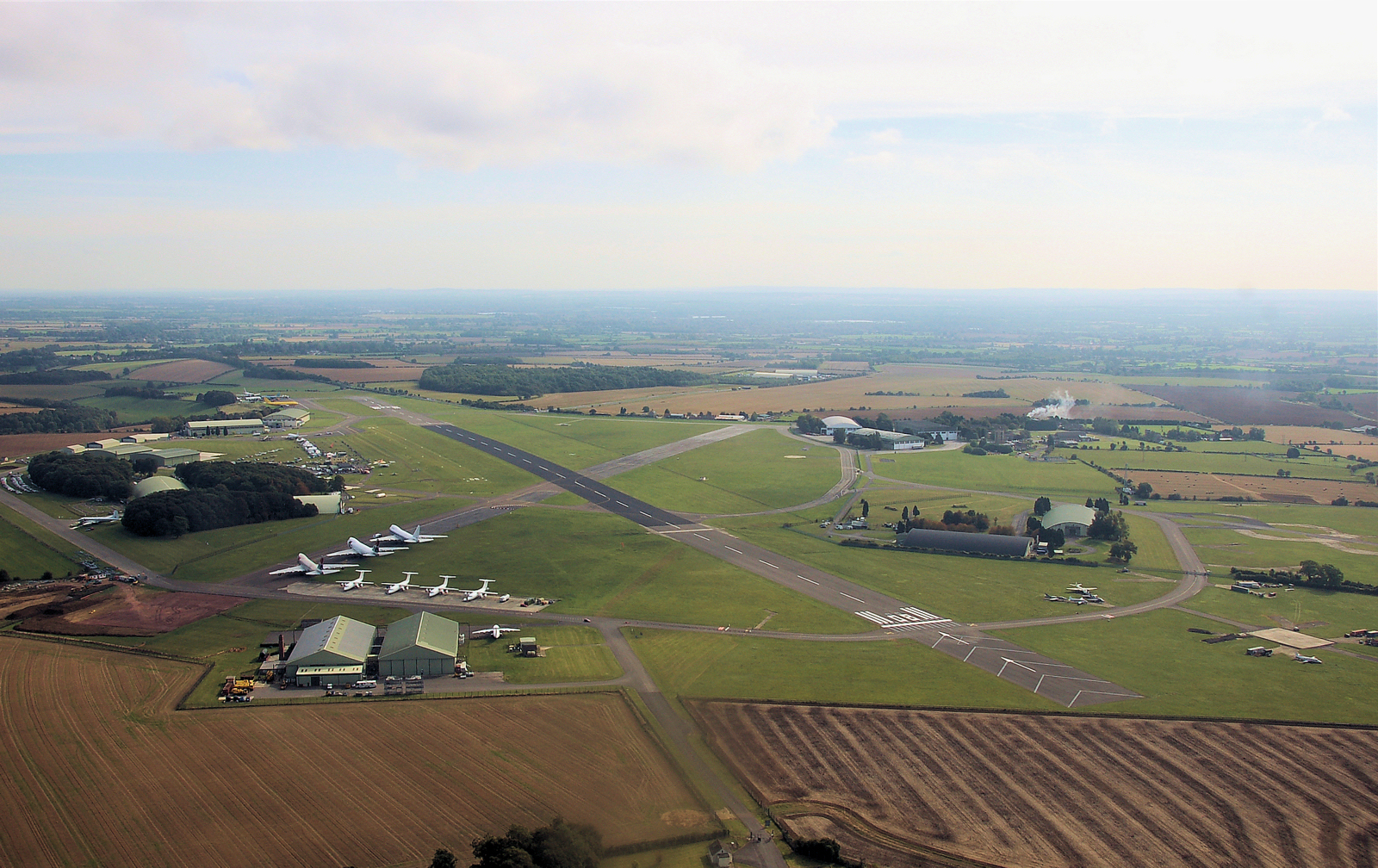
Cotswold Airport in England

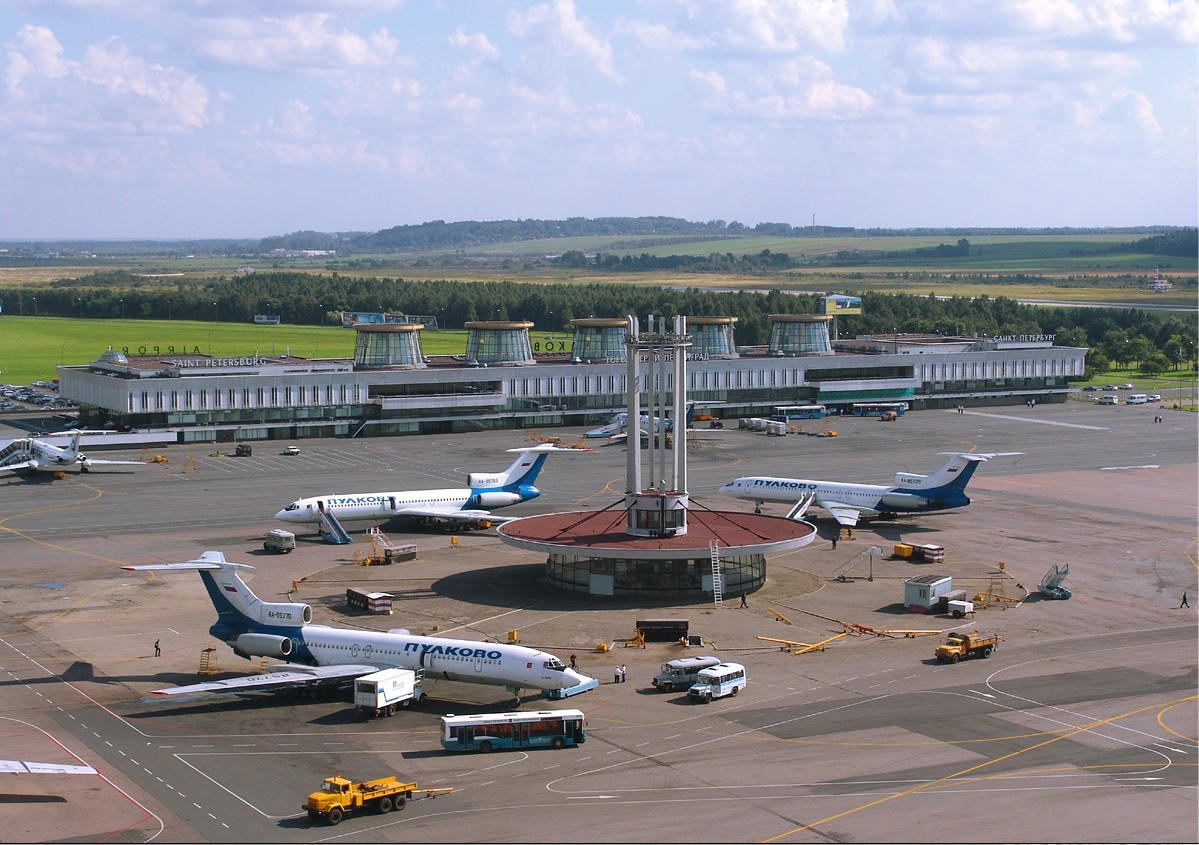
Pulkovo Airport, near Saint Petersburg, Russia

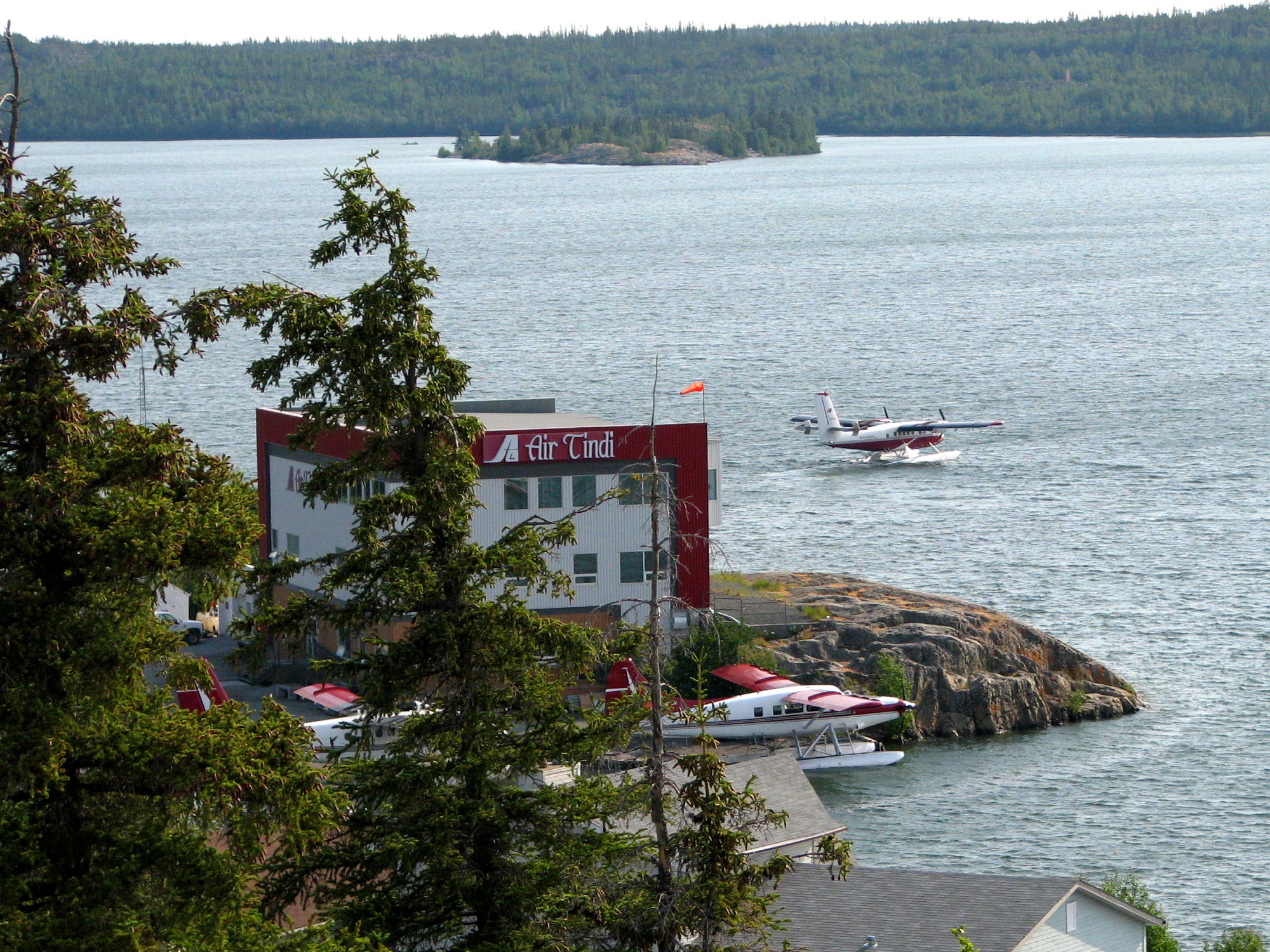
Yellowknife Water Aerodrome, Northwest Territories, Canada

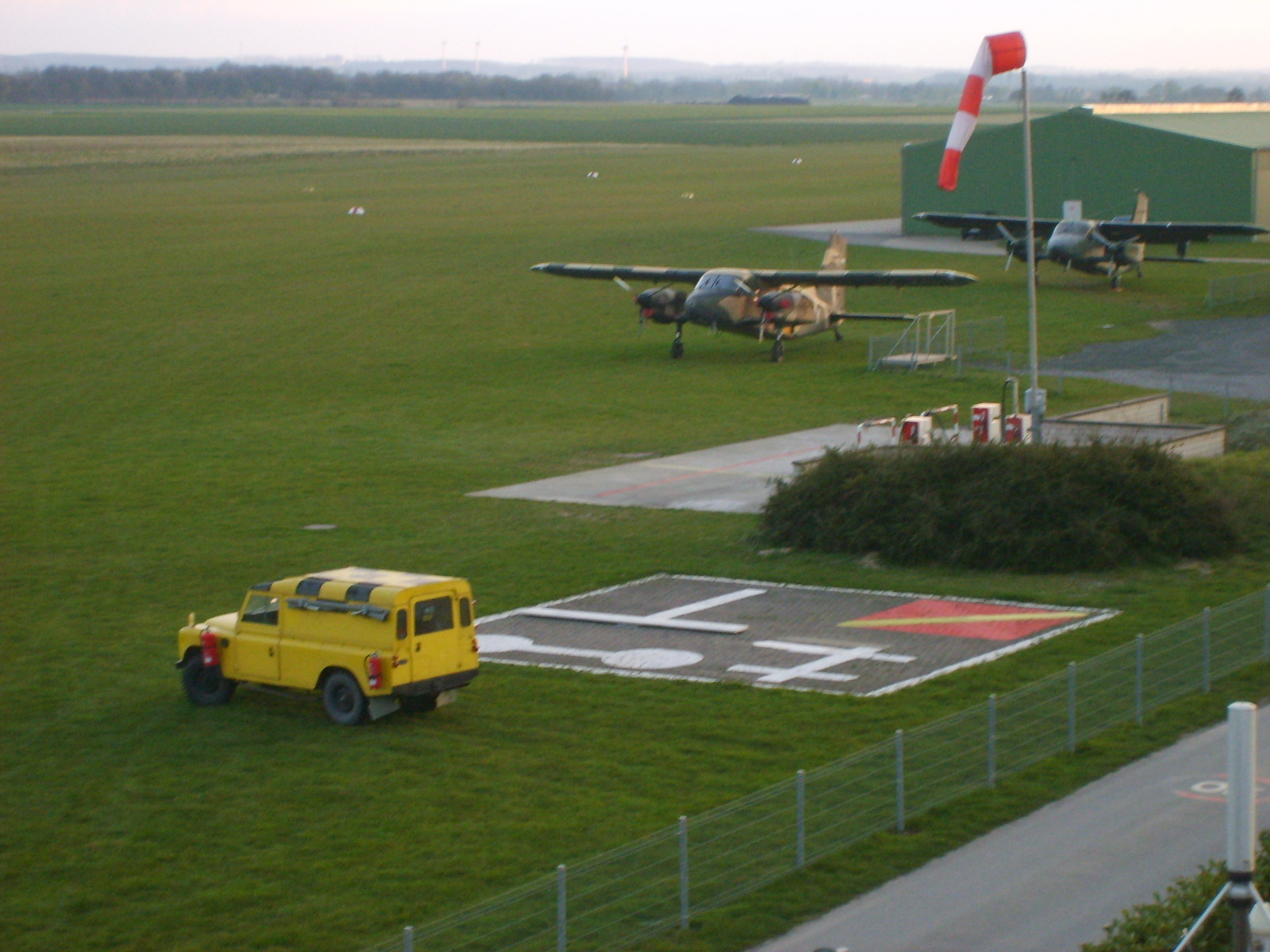
Soest-Bad Sassendorf Airfield near Soest, Germany

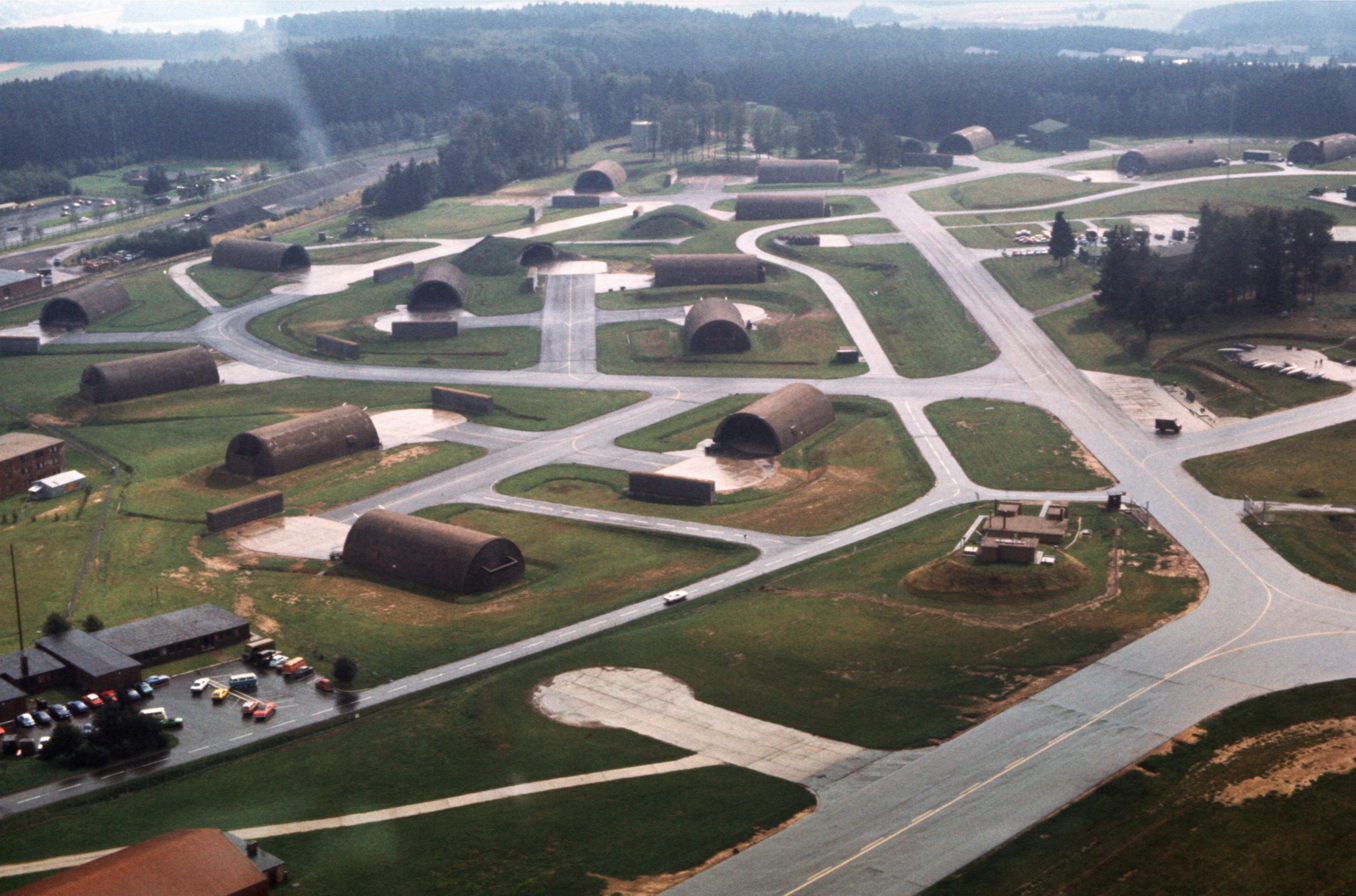
Hahn Air Base, near Kirchberg, Rhein-Hunsrück-Kreis, Germany

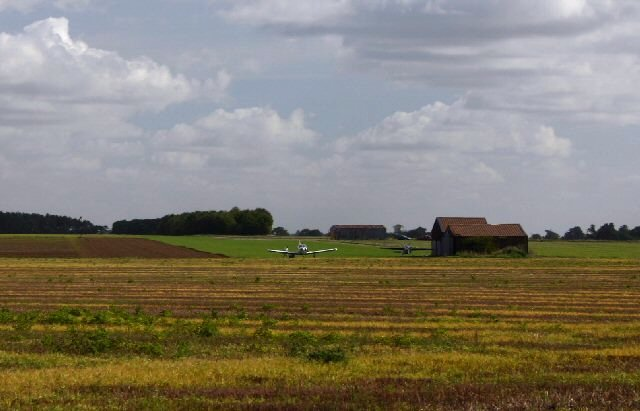
A private airstrip at what used to be RAF Knettishall

== See also ==
- Non-towered airport
- Spaceport
- Tabletop runway
- Wayport
