= List of the busiest airports in the Republic of Ireland =

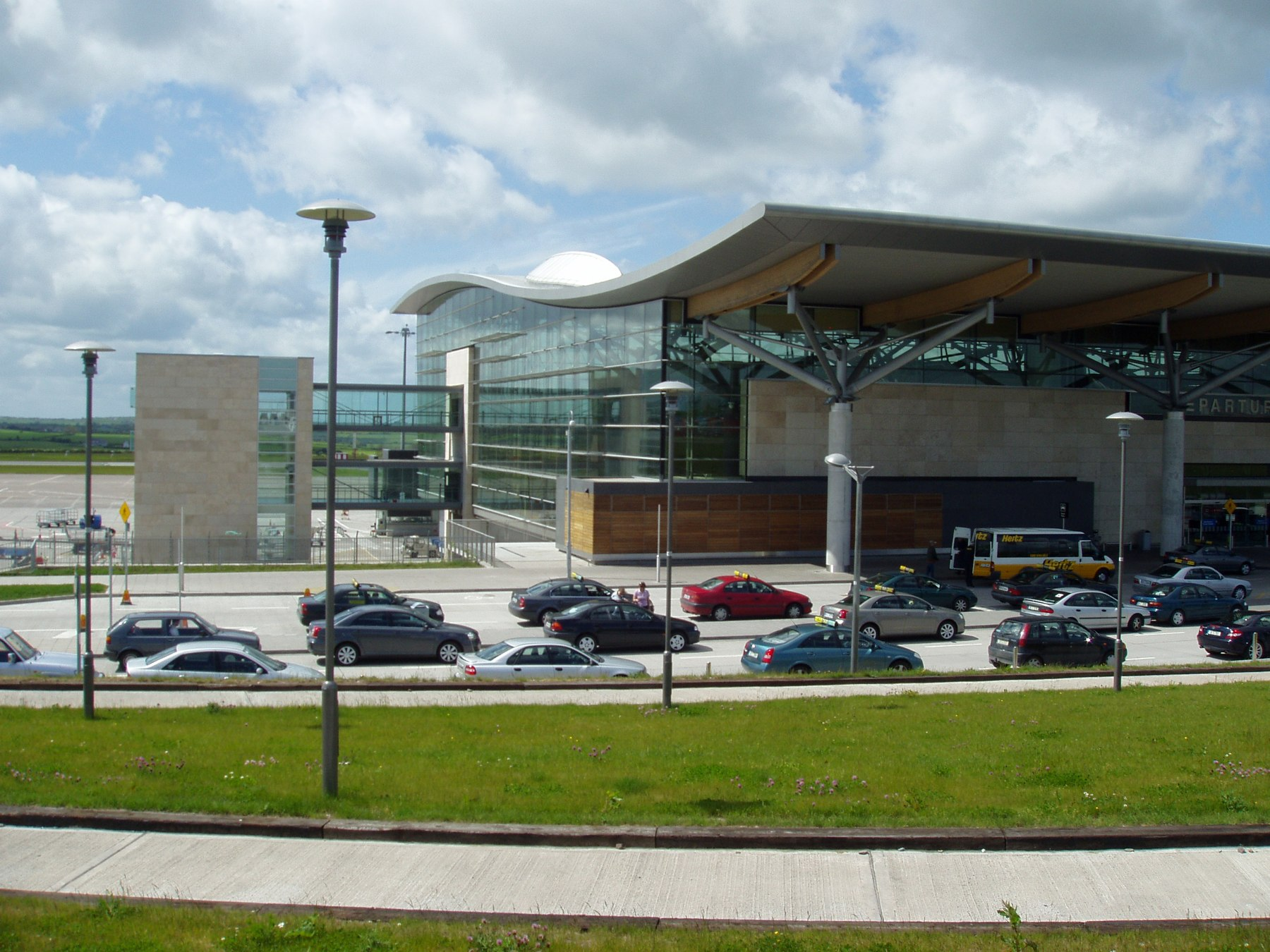
Cork Airport

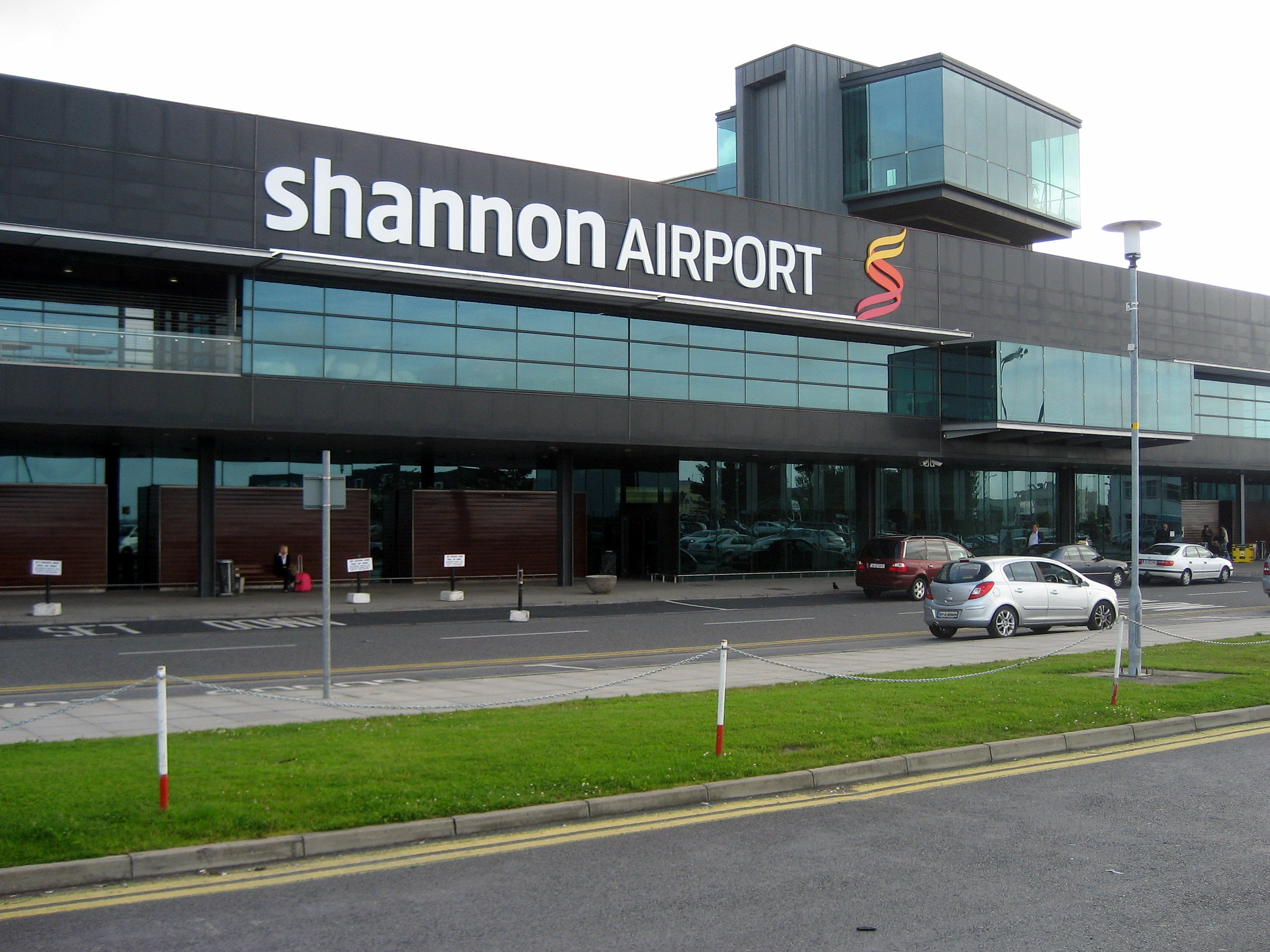
Shannon Airport

The following tables show 2008 to 2022 passenger traffic statistics for all airports in the Republic of Ireland, ranked by total passenger traffic each year. The data also shows available total aircraft movements at each airport based on statistics published by the Irish Aviation Authority.

Dublin Airport is the largest airport in Ireland, and in 2025 was the 12th busiest airport in Europe. Ireland has four main airports: Cork, Dublin, Shannon and Knock. There are also smaller regional airports at Donegal, Kerry, Galway, Sligo and Waterford. The latter three, as of July 2019, do not have any scheduled flights.

Many airlines serve Ireland with Aer Lingus, Aer Lingus Regional and Ryanair having a significant presence at Irish airports. North American airlines serving Ireland include Air Canada, American Airlines, Delta Air Lines and United Airlines.

Ireland is well connected with Europe mainly through Dublin, Cork and Shannon Airports. The United Kingdom is the most flown to country from Ireland. Transatlantic flights are available at Dublin Airport and Shannon Airports. US preclearance is available at both Dublin and Shannon Airports, two of fifteen US preclearance airports in the world.

== At a glance ==
The graph shows the yearly total passenger numbers handled by Irish airports.

== Table per year ==
=== 2025 data ===
Rank 2025	Airport	Location	Code (IATA/ICAO)	Total passengers 2024	Total passengers 2025	Passengers change 2024/25	Aircraft movements 2025
1	Dublin Airport	Dublin	DUB/EIDW	34,623,260	36,402,926	▲5%	
2	Cork Airport	Cork	ORK/EICK	3,068,449	3,461,453	▲13%	
3	Shannon Airport	Clare	SNN/EINN	2,050,831	2,239,668	▲9%	
4	Ireland West Airport	Mayo	NOC/EIKN	833,191	945,862	▲14%	
5	Kerry Airport	Kerry	KIR/EIKY	412,034	440,180	▲7%	
Total				41,038,295	43,490,089	▲6%	

=== 2024 data ===
Rank 2024	Airport	Location	Code (IATA/ICAO)	Total passengers 2023	Total passengers 2024	Passengers change 2023/24	Aircraft movements 2024
1	Dublin Airport	Dublin	DUB/EIDW	33,262,941	34,623,260	▲4%	
2	Cork Airport	Cork	ORK/EICK	2,798,024	3,068,449	▲10%	
3	Shannon Airport	Clare	SNN/EINN	1,897,599	2,050,831	▲8%	
4	Ireland West Airport	Mayo	NOC/EIKN	813,266	828,764	▲2%	
5	Kerry Airport	Kerry	KIR/EIKY	414,571	412,034	▼1%	
6	Donegal Airport	Donegal	CFN/EIDL	41,867	50,530	▲21%	
Total				39,228,268	41,033,868	▲5%	

=== 2023 data ===
Rank 2023	Airport	Location	Code (IATA/ICAO)	Total passengers 2022	Total passengers 2023	Passengers change 2022/23	Aircraft movements 2023
1	Dublin Airport	Dublin	DUB/EIDW	27,793,346	33,262,941	▲20%	
2	Cork Airport	Cork	ORK/EICK	2,238,455	2,798,024	▲25%	
3	Shannon Airport	Clare	SNN/EINN	1,421,986	1,897,599	▲33%	
4	Ireland West Airport	Mayo	NOC/EIKN	709,540	813,266	▲15%	
5	Kerry Airport	Kerry	KIR/EIKY	355,043	414,571	▲17%	
6	Donegal Airport	Donegal	CFN/EIDL	36,934	41,867	▲13%	
Total				32,555,204	39,228,268	▲20%	

=== 2022 data ===
Rank 2022	Airport	Location	Code (IATA/ICAO)	Total passengers 2021	Total passengers 2022	Passengers change 2021/22	Aircraft movements 2022
1	Dublin Airport	Dublin	DUB/EIDW	8,266,271	27,793,346	▲236%	
2 ▲	Cork Airport	Cork	ORK/EICK	255,014	2,238,455	▲777%	
3 ▼	Shannon Airport	Clare	SNN/EINN	322,162	1,421,986	▲341%	
4	Ireland West Airport	Mayo	NOC/EIKN	174,027	709,540	▲307%	
5	Kerry Airport	Kerry	KIR/EIKY	115,398	355,043	▲208%	
6	Donegal Airport	Donegal	CFN/EIDL	14,603	36,934	▲153%	
Total				9,147,475	32,555,204	▲256%	

=== 2021 data ===
Rank 2021	Airport	Location	Code (IATA/ICAO)	Total passengers 2020	Total passengers 2021	Passengers change 2020/21	Aircraft movements 2021
1	Dublin Airport	Dublin	DUB/EIDW	7,267,240	8,266,271	▲14%	
2 ▲	Shannon Airport	Clare	SNN/EINN	273,585	322,162	▲18%	
3 ▼	Cork Airport	Cork	ORK/EICK	527,014	255,014	▼52%	
4	Ireland West Airport	Mayo	NOC/EIKN	142,532	174,027	▲22%	
5	Kerry Airport	Kerry	KIR/EIKY	82,959	115,398	▲39%	
6	Donegal Airport	Donegal	CFN/EIDL	18,067	14,603	▼19%	
7	Connemara Airport	Galway	NNR/EICA	8,890			
8	Inishmore Aerodrome	Galway	IOR/EIIM	8,831			
Total				8,325,307	9,147,475	▲10%	

=== 2020 data ===
Rank 2020	Airport	Location	Code (IATA/ICAO)	Total passengers 2019	Total passengers 2020	Passengers change 2019/20	Aircraft movements 2020
1	Dublin Airport	Dublin	DUB/EIDW	32,676,251	7,267,240	▼77.8%	
2	Cork Airport	Cork	ORK/EICK	2,585,466	527,014	▼79.6%	
3	Shannon Airport	Clare	SNN/EINN	1,616,422	273,585	▼83.1%	
4	Ireland West Airport	Mayo	NOC/EIKN	805,443	142,532	▼82.3%	
5	Kerry Airport	Kerry	KIR/EIKY	369,836	82,959	▼77.6%	
6	Donegal Airport	Donegal	CFN/EIDL	48,542	18,067	▼62.8%	
7	Connemara Airport	Galway	NNR/EICA	15,382	8,890	▼42.2%	
8	Inishmore Aerodrome	Galway	IOR/EIIM	8,831	5,020	▼43.2%	
Total				38,126,173	8,325,307	▼78.2%	

=== 2019 data ===
Rank 2019	Airport	Location	Code (IATA/ICAO)	Total passengers 2018	Total passengers 2019	Passengers change 2018/19	Aircraft movements 2019
1	Dublin Airport	Dublin	DUB/EIDW	31,319,419	32,676,251	▲4.3%	232,138
2	Cork Airport	Cork	ORK/EICK	2,387,806	2,585,466	▲8.3%	21,556
3	Shannon Airport	Clare	SNN/EINN	1,677,611	1,616,422	▼3.7%	18,833
4	Ireland West Airport	Mayo	NOC/EIKN	775,063	805,443	▲3.9%	
5	Kerry Airport	Kerry	KIR/EIKY	365,339	369,836	▲1.2%	
6	Donegal Airport	Donegal	CFN/EIDL	46,537	48,542	▲4.3%	
7	Connemara Airport	Galway	NNR/EICA	15,322	15,382	▲0.4%	
8	Inishmore Aerodrome	Galway	IOR/EIIM	8,814	8,831	▲0.2%	
Total				36,595,961	38,126,173	▲4.2%	

=== 2018 data ===
Rank 2018	Airport	Location	Code (IATA/ICAO)	Total passengers 2017	Total passengers 2018	Passengers change 2017/18	Aircraft movements 2018
1	Dublin Airport	Dublin	DUB/EIDW	29,454,474	31,319,419	▲6.3%	
2	Cork Airport	Cork	ORK/EICK	2,301,450	2,387,806	▲3.8%	
3	Shannon Airport	Clare	SNN/EINN	1,599,390	1,677,611	▲4.9%	
4	Ireland West Airport	Mayo	NOC/EIKN	748,505	775,063	▲3.5%	
5	Kerry Airport	Kerry	KIR/EIKY	335,480	365,339	▲8.9%	
6	Donegal Airport	Donegal	CFN/EIDL	46,514	46,537	▲0.0%	
7	Connemara Airport	Galway	NNR/EICA	16,437	15,322	▼6.8%	
8	Inishmore Aerodrome	Galway	IOR/EIIM	9,335	8,814	▼5.6%	
Total				34,511,585	36,595,961	▲6.0%	

=== 2017 data ===
Rank 2017	Airport	Location	Code (IATA/ICAO)	Total passengers 2016	Total passengers 2017	Passengers change 2016/17	Aircraft movements 2017
1	Dublin Airport	Dublin	DUB/EIDW	27,778,888	29,454,474	▲6.0%	215,829
2	Cork Airport	Cork	ORK/EICK	2,226,233	2,301,450	▲3.4%	
3	Shannon Airport	Clare	SNN/EINN	1,674,567	1,599,390	▼4.5%	
4	Ireland West Airport	Mayo	NOC/EIKN	735,869	748,505	▲1.7%	
5	Kerry Airport	Kerry	KIR/EIKY	325,670	335,480	▲3.0%	
6	Donegal Airport	Donegal	CFN/EIDL	44,156	46,514	▲5.3%	
7	Connemara Airport	Galway	NNR/EICA	21,345	16,437	▼23.0%	
8 ▲	Inishmore Aerodrome	Galway	IOR/EIIM	12,667	9,335	▼26.3%	
9 ▼	Waterford Airport	Waterford	WAT/EIWF	13,511	0	▼100.0%	
Total				32,832,906	34,511,585	▲5.1%	

=== 2016 data ===
Rank 2016	Airport	Location	Code (IATA/ICAO)	Total passengers 2015	Total passengers 2016	Passengers change 2015/16	Aircraft movements 2016
1	Dublin Airport	Dublin	DUB/EIDW	24,962,518	27,778,888	▲11.3%	
2	Cork Airport	Cork	ORK/EICK	2,065,678	2,226,233	▲7.8%	
3	Shannon Airport	Clare	SNN/EINN	1,680,272	1,674,567	▼0.3%	
4	Ireland West Airport	Mayo	NOC/EIKN	684,671	735,869	▲7.5%	
5	Kerry Airport	Kerry	KIR/EIKY	303,039	325,670	▲7.5%	
6	Donegal Airport	Donegal	CFN/EIDL	36,552	44,156	▲20.8%	
7 ▲	Connemara Airport	Galway	NNR/EICA	19,753	21,345	▲8.1%	
8 ▼	Waterford Airport	Waterford	WAT/EIWF	34,249	13,511	▼60.6%	
9	Inishmore Aerodrome	Galway	IOR/EIIM	12,071	12,667	▲4.9%	
Total				29,761,419	32,832,906	▲10.3%	

=== 2015 data ===
Rank 2015	Airport	Location	Code (IATA/ICAO)	Total passengers 2014	Total passengers 2015	Passengers change 2014/15	Aircraft movements 2015
1	Dublin Airport	Dublin	DUB/EIDW	21,694,893	24,962,518	▲15.1%	
2	Cork Airport	Cork	ORK/EICK	2,138,057	2,065,678	▼3.4%	
3	Shannon Airport	Clare	SNN/EINN	1,555,225	1,680,272	▲8.0%	
4	Ireland West Airport	Mayo	NOC/EIKN	703,670	684,671	▼2.7%	
5	Kerry Airport	Kerry	KIR/EIKY	294,955	303,039	▲2.7%	
6	Donegal Airport	Donegal	CFN/EIDL	35,415	36,552	▲3.2%	
7	Waterford Airport	Waterford	WAT/EIWF	33,189	34,249	▲3.2%	
8	Connemara Airport	Galway	NNR/EICA	19,236	19,753	▲2.7%	
9	Inishmore Aerodrome	Galway	IOR/EIIM	11,491	12,071	▲5.0%	
Total				26,486,131	29,761,419	▲12.4%	

=== 2014 data ===
Rank 2014	Airport	Location	Code (IATA/ICAO)	Total passengers 2013	Total passengers 2014	Passengers change 2013/14	Aircraft movements 2014
1	Dublin Airport	Dublin	DUB/EIDW	20,148,574	21,694,893	▲7.7%	174,383
2	Cork Airport	Cork	ORK/EICK	2,252,636	2,138,057	▼5.1%	21,395
3	Shannon Airport	Clare	SNN/EINN	1,308,242	1,555,225	▲18.9%	20,005
4	Ireland West Airport	Mayo	NOC/EIKN	665,558	703,670	▲5.7%	
5	Kerry Airport	Kerry	KIR/EIKY	306,042	294,955	▼3.6%	
6	Donegal Airport	Donegal	CFN/EIDL	33,768	35,415	▲4.9%	
7	Waterford Airport	Waterford	WAT/EIWF	28,168	33,189	▲17.8%	
8	Connemara Airport	Galway	NNR/EICA	20,354	19,236	▼5.5%	
9	Inishmore Aerodrome	Galway	IOR/EIIM	12,393	11,491	▼7.3%	
Total				24,775,735	26,486,131	▲6.9%	215,783

=== 2013 data ===
Rank 2013	Airport	Location	Code (IATA/ICAO)	Total passengers 2012	Total passengers 2013	Passengers change 2012/13	Aircraft movements 2013
1	Dublin Airport	Dublin	DUB/EIDW	19,090,781	20,148,574	▲5.5%	163,703
2	Cork Airport	Cork	ORK/EICK	2,333,643	2,252,636	▼3.5%	18,030
3	Shannon Airport	Clare	SNN/EINN	1,286,139	1,308,242	▲1.7%	20,800
4	Ireland West Airport	Mayo	NOC/EIKN	677,368	665,558	▼1.7%	
5	Kerry Airport	Kerry	KIR/EIKY	286,442	306,042	▲6.8%	
6 ▲	Donegal Airport	Donegal	CFN/EIDL	29,226	33,768	▲15.5%	
7 ▼	Waterford Airport	Waterford	WAT/EIWF	77,875	28,168	▼63.8%	
8	Connemara Airport	Galway	NNR/EICA	19,490	20,354	▲4.4%	
9	Inishmore Aerodrome	Galway	IOR/EIIM	12,126	12,393	▲2.2%	
Total				23,813,090	24,775,735	▲4.0%	202,533

=== 2012 data ===
Rank 2012	Airport	Location	Code (IATA/ICAO)	Total passengers 2011	Total passengers 2012	Passengers change 2011/12	Aircraft movements 2012
1	Dublin Airport	Dublin	DUB/EIDW	18,740,078	19,090,781	▲1.9%	156,582
2	Cork Airport	Cork	ORK/EICK	2,356,629	2,333,643	▼1.0%	18,200
3	Shannon Airport	Clare	SNN/EINN	1,364,831	1,286,139	▼5.8%	21,784
4	Ireland West Airport	Mayo	NOC/EIKN	653,637	677,368	▲3.6%	
5	Kerry Airport	Kerry	KIR/EIKY	310,937	286,442	▼7.9%	
6	Waterford Airport	Waterford	WAT/EIWF	81,575	77,875	▼4.5%	
7 ▲	Donegal Airport	Donegal	CFN/EIDL	38,309	29,226	▼23.7%	
8 ▲	Connemara Airport	Galway	NNR/EICA	17,966	19,490	▲8.5%	
9 ▲	Inishmore Aerodrome	Galway	IOR/EIIM	10,629	12,126	▲14.1%	
10 ▼	Galway Airport	Galway	GWY/EICM	67,002	0	▼100.0%	
11	Sligo Airport	Sligo	SXL/EISG	7,111	0	▼100.0%	
Total				23,657,704	23,813,090	▲0.7%	196,566

=== 2011 data ===
Rank 2011	Airport	Location	Code (IATA/ICAO)	Total passengers 2010	Total passengers 2011	Passengers change 2010/11	Aircraft movements 2011
1	Dublin Airport	Dublin	DUB/EIDW	18,426,823	18,749,078	▲1.7%	154,457
2	Cork Airport	Cork	ORK/EICK	2,422,872	2,356,629	▼2.7%	19,275
3	Shannon Airport	Clare	SNN/EINN	1,531,309	1,364,831	▼10.9%	22,173
4	Ireland West Airport	Mayo	NOC/EIKN	586,393	653,637	▲11.5%	
5	Kerry Airport	Kerry	KIR/EIKY	383,866	310,937	▼19.0%	
6 ▲	Waterford Airport	Waterford	WAT/EIWF	103,986	81,575	▼21.6%	
7 ▼	Galway Airport	Galway	GWY/EICM	154,814	67,002	▼56.7%	
8	Donegal Airport	Donegal	CFN/EIDL	46,825	38,309	▼18.2%	
9 ▲	Connemara Airport	Galway	NNR/EICA	19,612	17,966	▼8.4%	
10 ▲	Inishmore Aerodrome	Galway	IOR/EIIM	11,650	10,629	▼8.8%	
11 ▼	Sligo Airport	Sligo	SXL/EISG	21,077	7,111	▼66.3%	
Total				23,709,227	23,657,704	▼0.2%	195,905

=== 2010 data ===
Rank 2010	Airport	Location	Code (IATA/ICAO)	Total passengers 2009	Total passengers 2010	Passengers change 2009/10	Aircraft movements 2010
1	Dublin Airport	Dublin	DUB/EIDW	20,507,446	18,426,823	▼10.1%	153,101
2	Cork Airport	Cork	ORK/EICK	2,767,776	2,422,872	▼12.5%	18,771
3	Shannon Airport	Clare	SNN/EINN	2,579,676	1,531,309	▼40.6%	23,626
4	Ireland West Airport	Mayo	NOC/EIKN	606,464	586,393	▼3.3%	
5	Kerry Airport	Kerry	KIR/EIKY	356,738	383,866	▲7.6%	
6	Galway Airport	Galway	GWY/EICM	195,804	154,814	▼20.9%	
7	Waterford Airport	Waterford	WAT/EIWF	110,826	103,986	▼6.2%	
8	Donegal Airport	Donegal	CFN/EIDL	50,761	46,825	▼7.8%	
9	Sligo Airport	Sligo	SXL/EISG	26,706	21,077	▼21.1%	
10	Connemara Airport	Galway	NNR/EICA	18,869	19,612	▲3.9%	
11	Inishmore Aerodrome	Galway	IOR/EIIM	9,872	11,650	▲18.0%	
Total				27,230,938	23,709,227	▼12.9%	195,498

=== 2009 data ===
Rank 2009	Airport	Location	Code (IATA/ICAO)	Total passengers 2008	Total passengers 2009	Passengers change 2008/09	Aircraft movements 2009
1	Dublin Airport	Dublin	DUB/EIDW	23,507,205	20,507,446	▼12.8%	169,087
2	Cork Airport	Cork	ORK/EICK	3,259,109	2,767,776	▼15.1%	27,691
3	Shannon Airport	Clare	SNN/EINN	2,956,327	2,579,676	▼12.7%	25,949
4	Ireland West Airport	Mayo	NOC/EIKN	630,806	606,464	▼3.9%	
5	Kerry Airport	Kerry	KIR/EIKY	426,115	356,738	▼16.3%	
6	Galway Airport	Galway	GWY/EICM	266,473	195,804	▼26.5%	
7	Waterford Airport	Waterford	WAT/EIWF	144,253	110,826	▼23.2%	
8	Donegal Airport	Donegal	CFN/EIDL	65,539	50,761	▼22.5%	
9	Sligo Airport	Sligo	SXL/EISG	42,493	26,706	▼37.2%	
10	Connemara Airport	Galway	NNR/EICA	19,442	18,869	▼2.9%	
11	Inishmore Aerodrome	Galway	IOR/EIIM	10,628	9,872	▼7.1%	
Total				31,328,390	27,230,938	▼13.1%	222,727

== See also ==
- List of the busiest airports in Europe
- Busiest airports in the United Kingdom by total passenger traffic
- List of the busiest airports in the Nordic countries
- List of the busiest airports in the Baltic states
