= EITM =

EITM may refer to:

- Enterprise IT Management
- Elliot in the Morning
- Trim Aerodrome, the ICAO code for the airport in Ireland
