= Transport in Ireland =

Most of the transport system in Ireland is in public hands, either side of the Irish border. The Irish road network has evolved separately in the two jurisdictions into which Ireland is divided, while the Irish rail network was mostly created prior to the partition of Ireland.

In the Republic of Ireland, the Minister for Transport, acting through the Department of Transport, is responsible for the state's road network, rail network, public transport, airports and several other areas. Although some sections of road have been built using private or public-private funds, and are operated as toll roads, they are owned by the Government of Ireland. The rail network is also state-owned and operated, while the government currently still owns the main airports. Public transport is mainly in the hands of a statutory corporation, Córas Iompair Éireann (CIÉ), and its subsidiaries, Dublin Bus, Bus Éireann (Irish Bus), and Iarnród Éireann (Irish Rail).

On 1 November 2005, the Irish government published the Transport 21 plan which includes €18bn for improved roads and €16bn for improved rail, including the Western Railway Corridor and the Dublin Metro.

The Republic of Ireland's transport sector is responsible for 21% of the state's greenhouse gas emissions.

In Northern Ireland, the road network and railways are in state ownership. The Department for Infrastructure is responsible for these and other areas (such as water services). Two of the three main airports in Northern Ireland are privately operated and owned. The exception is City of Derry Airport, which is owned and funded by Derry City and Strabane District Council A statutory corporation, the Northern Ireland Transport Holding Company (which trades as Translink) operates public transport services through its three subsidiaries – NI Railways Company Limited, Ulsterbus Limited, and Citybus Limited (now branded as Metro).

== Railways ==
Ireland's rail network

Total
1,600 mm (5 ft 3 in) broad gauge
1,947 km (1,210 mi) (1998); 38 km (24 mi) electrified; 485 km (301 mi) double track; some additions and removals since 1997

1,435 mm (4 ft 8 1/2 in) standard gauge
36.5 km (22.7 mi) (2004) (Luas tramway); 36.5 km (22.7 mi) electrified; 36.5 km (22.7 mi) double track; additional track under construction

914 mm (3 ft) narrow gauge
1,365 km (848 mi) (2006) (industrial railway operated by Bord na Móna)

Ireland's railways are in State ownership, with Iarnród Éireann (Irish Rail) operating services in the Republic and NI Railways operating services in Northern Ireland. The two companies co-operate in providing the joint Enterprise service between Dublin and Belfast. InterCity services are provided between Dublin and the major towns and cities of the Republic, and in Ulster along the Belfast–Derry railway line. Suburban railway networks operate in Dublin, Dublin Suburban Rail, and Belfast, Belfast Suburban Rail, with limited local services being offered in, or planned for, Cork, Limerick, and Galway.

The rail network in Ireland was developed by various private companies during the 19th century, with some receiving government funding. The network reached its greatest extent by 1920. A broad gauge of 1600mm (5 ft 3in) was agreed as the standard for the island, although there were also hundreds of kilometres of 914mm (3 ft) narrow-gauge railways.

Many lines in the west were decommissioned in the 1930s under Éamon de Valera, with a further large cull in services by both CIÉ and the Ulster Transport Authority (UTA) during the 1960s, leaving few working lines in the northern third of the island. There is a campaign to bring some closed lines back into service, in particular the Limerick-Sligo line (the Western Railway Corridor), to facilitate economic regeneration in the west, which has lagged behind the rest of the country. There is also a move to restore service on the Dublin to Navan line, and smaller campaigns to re-establish the rail links between Sligo and Enniskillen/Omagh/Derry and Mullingar and Athlone/Galway. Under the Irish government's Transport 21 plan, the Cork to Midleton rail link was reopened in 2009. The re-opening of the Navan-Clonsilla rail link and the Western Rail Corridor are amongst future projects as part of the same plan.

Public transport services in Northern Ireland are sparse in comparison with those of the rest of Ireland or Great Britain. A large railway network was severely curtailed in the 1950s and 1960s. Current services includes suburban routes to Larne, Newry and Bangor, as well as services to Derry. There is also a branch from Coleraine to Portrush.

Since 1984 an electrified train service run by Iarnród Éireann has linked Dublin with its coastal suburbs. Running initially between Bray and Howth, the Dublin Area Rapid Transit (DART) system was extended from Bray to Greystones in 2000 and further extended from Howth Junction to Malahide. In 2004 a light rail system, Luas, was opened in Dublin serving the central and western suburbs, run by Veolia under franchise from the Railway Procurement Agency. The construction of the Luas system caused much disruption in Dublin. Plans to construct a Dublin Metro service including underground lines were mooted in 2001, but stalled in the financial crisis at the end of that decade.

Ireland has one of the largest dedicated freight railways in Europe, operated by Bord na Móna and totalling nearly 1,400 kilometres (870 mi).

== Road transport ==
The motorway and primary road network of Ireland, as of 2025

=== Roads and cars in Ireland ===
Total – 117,318 km (72,898 mi)
South: 92,500 km (57,500 mi) including 1,015 km (631 mi) of motorway (2010)
North: 24,818 km (15,421 mi) including 148 km (92 mi) of motorway (2008)

paved – 87,043 km (54,086 mi), unpaved – 5,457 km (3,391 mi)

Ireland's roads link Dublin with all the major cities (Belfast, Cork, Limerick, Derry, Galway, and Waterford). Driving is on the left. Signposts in the Republic of Ireland are shown in kilometres and speed limits in kilometres per hour. Distance and speed limit signs in Northern Ireland use imperial units in common with the rest of the United Kingdom.

Historically, land owners developed most roads and later turnpike trusts collected tolls so that as early as 1800 Ireland had a 16,100 kilometres (10,000 mi) road network. In 2005 the Irish Government launched Transport 21, a plan envisaging the investment of €34 billion in transport infrastructure from 2006 until 2015. Several road projects were progressed but the economic crisis that began in 2008–09 has prevented its full implementation.

Between 2011 and 2015, diesel cars constituted 70% of new cars. In 2015, 27 new cars per 1,000 inhabitants were registered in Ireland, the same as the EU average.

=== Bus services ===
Ireland's first mail coach services were contracted with the government by John Anderson with William Bourne in 1791 who also paid to improve the condition of the roads. The system of mail coaches, carriages and "bians" was further developed by Charles Bianconi, based in Clonmel, from 1815 as a fore-runner of the modern Irish public transportation system.

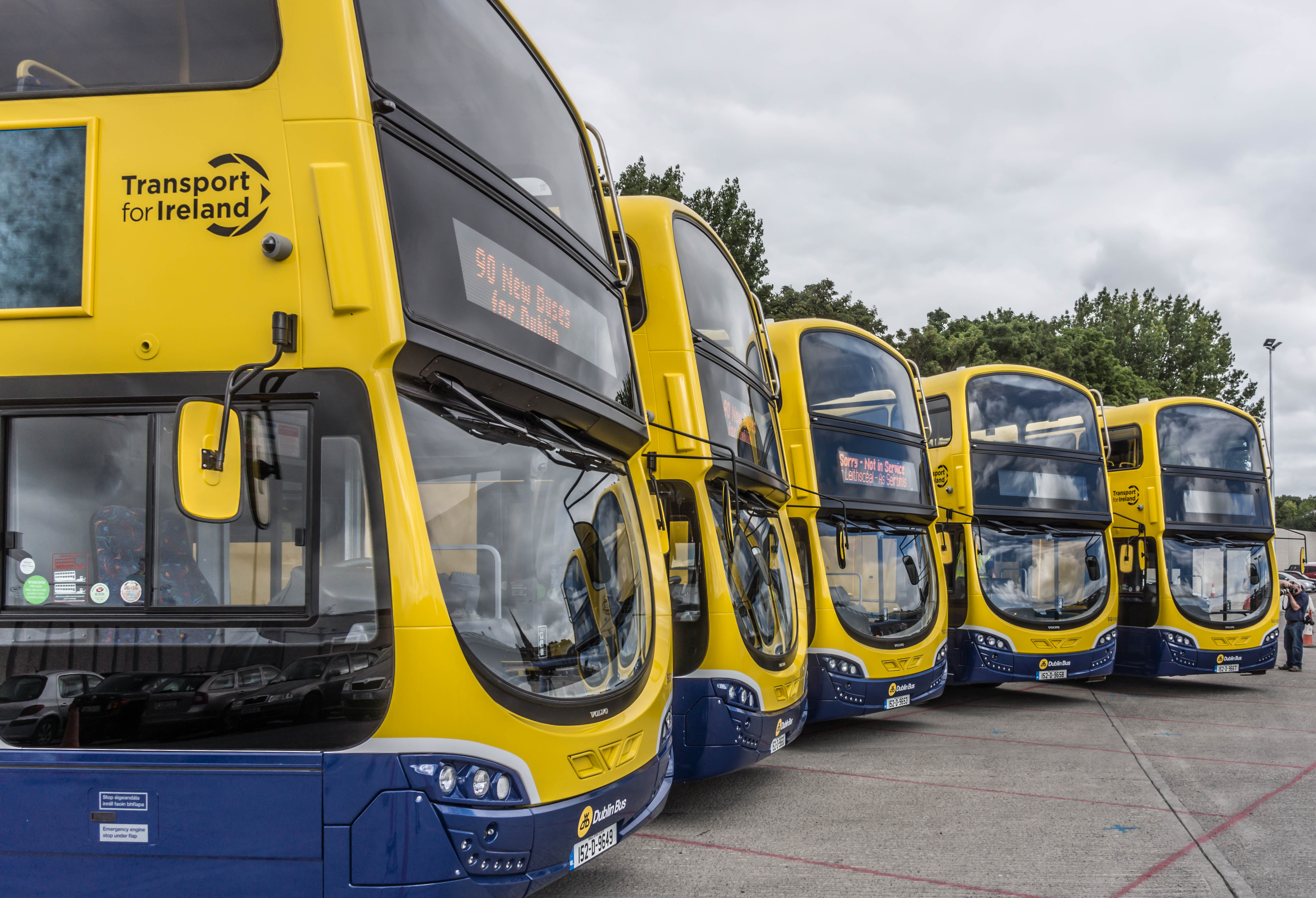
Part of a fleet of 90 new double decker buses introduced to Dublin in 2015

State-owned Bus Éireann (Irish Bus) currently provides most bus services in the Republic of Ireland, outside Dublin, including an express coach network connecting most cities in Ireland, along with local bus services in the provincial cities. Dublin Bus, a sister company of Bus Éireann, provides most of the bus services in Dublin, with some other operators providing a number of routes. These include Aircoach, a subsidiary of FirstGroup which provides services to Dublin Airport from Dublin city centre, South Dublin City, Greystones and Bray. They also operate two intercity express non-stop services between Dublin Airport, Dublin City Centre, and Cork and also a non-stop route between Belfast City Centre, Dublin Airport and Dublin City. Other operators such as Irish Citylink and GoBus.ie compete on the Dublin-Galway route. Matthews Coaches run a direct service from Bettystown, Laytown and Julianstown to Dublin whilst Dublin Coach operate services to Portlaoise and Limerick. JJ Kavanagh and Sons also operates regular services on the Portlaoise/Limerick route as well as offering services to Waterford, Carlow, Kilkenny, Clonmel and a selection of regional towns and villages in the south.

TFI Local Link is a set of not-for-profit operators, funded via the National Transport Authority, that provide bus services in rural Ireland. Other private rural operators exist, such as Halpenny's in Blackrock, County Louth, which was the first private bus operator to run a public service in Ireland, Bus Feda (Feda O'Donnell Coaches), which operates twice daily routes from Ranafast, County Donegal to Galway and back.

In Northern Ireland Ulsterbus provides the bus network, with its sister company Metro providing services in Belfast. Both are part of state-owned Translink. Tiger Coaches operates a very late night bus service on Friday and Saturday nights between Belfast and Lisburn.

Private hire companies offer groups travelling throughout Ireland with options ranging from cars to 56 passenger coaches. Private Coach Hire Companies can be found at CTTC.ie.

Cross-border services (e.g. Dublin city centre to Belfast) are run primarily by a partnership of Ulsterbus and Bus Éireann with some services run across the border exclusively by one of the two companies (e.g. Derry–Sligo run by Bus Éireann). Aircoach, a private operator, does however operate a competing Dublin to Belfast Express service via Dublin Airport.

According to an Irish Times article in September 2022, 14.3% of national journeys in the Republic of Ireland were undertaken by bus, compared to the European average of 8.8%. However, this may be partly due to the lack of widespread train coverage in the country, as Ireland's figure of 3.1% usage of trains for journeys is well behind the European average of 7.9%.

== Modal share ==
Mode of travel	2012	2013	2014	2016	2019
Private car – driver	70.4%	69.0%	69.1%	69.4%	64.9%
Private car – passenger	6.1%	5.8%	5.3%	4.9%	8.8%
Walk	13.6%	15.4%	14.8%	14.6%	13.5%
Bus	3.9%	3.8%	4.4%	4.2%	4.8%
Cycle	1.2%	1.3%	1.6%	1.7%	1.5%
Rail / DART / Luas	1.3%	1.5%	1.4%	1.3%	1.8%
Taxi / hackney	0.8%	0.9%	0.9%	0.8%	0.9%
Lorry / motorcycle / other	2.7%	2.5%	2.5%	3.2%	3.7%

== Waterways ==
Total (2004) – 753 km (468 mi)
(pleasure craft only on inland waterways, several lengthy estuarine waterways)

- Grand Canal
- Royal Canal
- Shannon–Erne Waterway
- River Barrow
- River Shannon
- Lower Bann
- Newry Ship Canal

== Pipelines ==
Natural gas transmission network 1,795 km (1,115 mi) (2003). There is a much more extensive distribution network.

== Ports and harbours ==
Ireland has major ports in Dublin, Belfast, Cork, Rosslare, Derry and Waterford. Smaller ports exist in Arklow, Ballina, Drogheda, Dundalk, Dún Laoghaire, Foynes, Galway, Larne, Limerick, New Ross, Sligo, Warrenpoint and Wicklow.

Ports in the Republic of Ireland handled 2.8 million travellers crossing the sea between Ireland and Great Britain in 2014, a decrease of 1 million passengers movements since 2003. This has been steadily dropping for a number of years (20% since 1999), probably as a result of low cost airlines.

=== Ferries ===
Ferry connections between Britain and Ireland via the Irish Sea include the routes from Fishguard and Pembroke to Rosslare, and Cairnryan to Larne. The Stranraer to Belfast and Larne routes and the Swansea to Cork route have closed. There is also a connection between Liverpool and Belfast via the Isle of Man. The world's largest car ferry, Ulysses, is operated by Irish Ferries on the Dublin–Holyhead route.

In addition, there are ferries from Rosslare and Dublin to Cherbourg and Roscoff in France.

The vast majority of heavy goods trade is done by sea. Northern Irish ports handle 10 megatonnes (Mt) of goods trade with Britain annually, while ports in the Republic handle 7.6 Mt, representing 50% and 40% respectively of total trade by weight.

Ferry services from Ireland
Name	From	To	Operator	Website	Seasonal?	Type
Scenic Lough Foyle Ferry	Greencastle, County Donegal	Magilligan Point, County Londonderry	Frazer Foyle Holdings	loughfoyleferry.com	Summer only	Passenger (foot, vehicle)
Kintyre Express	Ballycastle	Port Ellen, Scotland	Craig of Campbeltown	kintyreexpress.com	Summer only	Passenger (foot only)
Rathlin Island Ferry	Ballycastle	Rathlin Island	Dunaverty	www.rathlin-ferry.com	All year	Passenger (foot, vehicle)
Kintyre Express	Ballycastle	Campbeltown, Scotland	Craig of Campbeltown	kintyreexpress.com	Summer only	Passenger (foot only)
P&O Larne - Cairnryan	Larne	Cairnryan, Scotland	P&O	www.poferries.com	All year	Passenger (foot, vehicle); freight
Stena Belfast - Cairnryan	Belfast	Cairnryan, Scotland	Stena Line	www.stenaline.co.uk	All year	Passenger (foot, vehicle); freight
Isle of Man Steam Packet	Larne	Douglas, Isle of Man	Isle of Man Steam Packet Company	www.steam-packet.com	All year	Passenger (foot, vehicle)
Stena Belfast - Heysham	Belfast	Heysham, England	Stena Line	www.stenaline.com	All year	Freight
Stena Belfast - Liverpool	Belfast	Liverpool, England	Stena Line	www.stenaline.co.uk	All year	Passenger (foot, vehicle); freight
Strangford Ferry	Strangford	Portaferry	Dept for Infrastructure NI	www.nidirect.gov.uk	All year	Passenger (vehicle, foot)
Omeath Ferry	Warrenpoint,	Omeath, County Louth			Summer only	Passenger (foot)
Carlingford Lough Ferry	Greencastle, County Down	Greenore, County Louth	Rooskey Frazer & Co	carlingfordferry.com	All year	Passenger (vehicle, foot)
Seatruck	Warrenpoint	Heysham	Seatruck	www.seatruckferries.com/r	All year	Freight

=== Mercantile Marine (Note: In Ireland it is the "Mercantile Marine"; in the United Kingdom it is the "Merchant Navy"; in the USA it is the "Merchant Marine".) ===
Total – 35 ships (with a volume of 1,000 gross tonnage (GT) or over) totalling 288,401 GT/383,628 tonnes deadweight (DWT)
Ships by type – bulk carrier 7, cargo ship 22, chemical tanker 1, container ship 3, roll-on/roll-off ship 1, short-sea passenger 1
Foreign-owned – Germany 3, Italy 7, Norway 2
Registered in other countries – 18 (2003 est.)

== Aviation ==
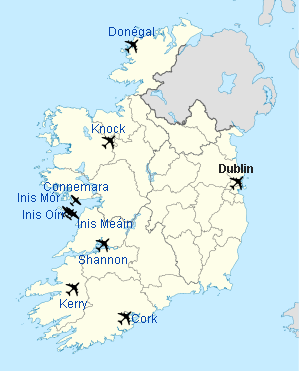
Irish airports

Ireland has four main international airports: Dublin Airport, Cork Airport, Shannon Airport and Ireland West Airport (Knock). Dublin Airport is the busiest of these carrying almost 35 million passengers per year; a second terminal (T2) was opened in November 2010. All provide services to Great Britain and continental Europe, while Cork, Dublin and Shannon also offer transatlantic services. The London to Dublin air route is the ninth busiest international air route in the world, and also the busiest international air route in Europe, with 14,500 flights between the two in 2017. In 2015, 4.5 million people took the route, at that time, the world's second-busiest. Aer Lingus is the flag carrier of Ireland, although Ryanair is the country's largest airline. Ryanair is Europe's largest low-cost carrier, the second largest in terms of passenger numbers, and the world's largest in terms of international passenger numbers. For several decades until 2007 Shannon was a mandatory stopover for transatlantic routes to the United States. In recent years it has opened a pre-screening service allowing passengers to pass through US immigration services before departing from Ireland.

There are also several smaller regional airports: Belfast City Airport, City of Derry Airport, Galway Airport, Kerry Airport (Farranfore), Sligo Airport (Strandhill), Waterford Airport and Donegal Airport (Carrickfinn). Scheduled services from these regional points are in the main limited to flights travelling to other parts of Ireland and to Great Britain. Airlines based in Ireland include Aer Lingus (the former national airline of the Republic of Ireland), Ryanair, Aer Arann and CityJet. Services to the Aran Islands are operated from Aerfort na Minna (Connemara Regional Airport).

Ireland's national airline, Aer Lingus, provides services from Belfast City, Cork, Dublin and Shannon to Europe, North Africa and North America. Dublin and Cork airports are run by a State body, DAA (Dublin Airport Authority). Other Irish airlines are Ryanair, one of the largest in the world, CityJet, ASL Airlines Ireland and the Aer Lingus subsidiary Aer Lingus Regional. A number of other operators specialise in general aviation.

=== Airport passenger numbers ===
For 2018 the passenger numbers were as follows:

Rank	Airport	Runways	Max. length	Passengers	Change 2015–2016
1	Dublin	3	2,637 m (8,652 ft)	31,319,419	▲6.3%
2	Belfast International	2	2,780 m (9,120 ft)	6,268,960	▲7.4%
3	Belfast City	1	1,829 m (6,001 ft)	2,511,261	▼1.9%
4	Cork	2	2,133 m (6,998 ft)	2,387,806	▲3.8%
5	Shannon	1	3,199 m (10,495 ft)	1,677,611	▲4.9%
6	Ireland West Airport	1	2,340 m (7,680 ft)	775,063	▲3.5%
7	Kerry	1	2,000 m (6,600 ft)	365,339	▲8.9%
8	City of Derry	1	1,969 m (6,460 ft)	185,843	▼4.2%
9	Donegal	1	1,496 m (4,908 ft)	46,537	▲0.0%
10	Connemara	1	600 m (2,000 ft)	15,322	▼6.8%
11	Inishmore	1	490 m (1,610 ft)	8,814	▼5.6%

== Gateway Irish urban reference destination distances ==
=== Midlands Gateway urban destination distances ===
- The distances given below are in kilometres as travelling through the Midlands Gateway ATM (Athlone-Tullamore-Mullingar).
- Where it is logical to travel along the east or west coast directly, these distances are provided according to the popular route.
- Urban by-passes, rockades, diversions, detours and all other dispositives prolonging the travelled distances between destinations are equated to ZERO.

This is an estimation distance guide only.

City / town
1	2	3	4	5	6	7	8	9	10	11	12	13	14	15	16	17	18	19	20	21	22	23	24	25	26	27	28	29	30	31	32	33
Athboy
80	Athlone																															
188	241	Ballymena																														
144	221	46	Belfast																													
100	128	298	285	Castlebar																												
60	80	152	136	168	Cavan																											
232	255	44	91	269	180	Coleraine																										
368	217	467	424	274	300	491	Cork																									
220	234	89	114	221	163	50	478	Derry																								
40	142	163	120	230	88	187	309	188	Drogheda																							
80	124	211	168	235	108	235	259	236	53	M-50 Dublin																						
72	160	127	84	248	80	152	341	165	37	85	Dundalk																					
248	219	418	375	301	274	443	78	430	260	211	211	Dungarvan																				
60	40	222	176	130	40	200	297	193	90	80	120	251	Edgeworthst.																			
184	108	453	407	173	213	387	140	408	296	243	324	160	148	Ennis																		
120	126	434	168	160	46	157	363	107	137	154	100	337	86	234	Enniskillen																	
128	96	354	341	92	160	326	201	276	268	219	249	227	136	80	190	Galway																
152	124	333	290	250	178	358	148	345	175	126	207	96	155	150	265	174	Kilkenny															
160	230	515	472	290	319	539	87	476	357	308	389	165	296	155	382	215	195	Killarney														
160	123	409	366	183	217	417	99	368	251	202	283	119	175	41	280	109	131	114	Limerick													
40	55	245	197	112	56	228	284	191	118	105	147	244	15	156	101	156	162	310	202	Longford												
32	48	215	169	154	59	232	242	221	75	65	85	216	35	155	121	144	120	261	159	42	Mullingar											
60	116	244	201	227	130	269	223	256	86	37	118	175	107	206	193	205	89	272	165	114	72	Naas										
100	80	368	325	174	169	332	134	307	210	161	242	151	146	84	232	100	93	149	43	153	111	124	Nenagh									
60	179	97	110	199	72	102	423	57	133	181	110	375	143	338	50	255	290	404	297	128	130	201	254	Omagh								
200	202	375	332	328	300	400	195	387	217	160	249	117	235	239	363	306	121	280	198	242	200	141	202	332	Rosslare							
180	134	374	392	168	279	402	119	352	277	227	309	146	214	20	342	94	158	134	28	221	179	190	69	329	224	Shannon						
160	117	215	202	84	121	187	323	137	201	207	200	334	96	255	75	175	228	338	231	81	123	199	195	114	358	216	Sligo					
260	215	509	466	249	312	483	118	434	351	302	383	195	289	148	375	175	228	33	107	296	254	265	143	398	295	128	297	Tralee				
60	43	256	213	169	93	281	207	256	149	101	130	181	80	165	156	138	85	226	124	77	35	89	76	204	164	144	158	219	Tullamore			
160	174	373	330	310	228	397	123	385	215	166	247	46	205	170	291	236	51	208	129	212	170	129	160	329	73	155	289	226	135	Waterford		
180	189	350	307	315	244	374	184	362	112	134	224	107	263	228	307	295	110	269	187	228	186	129	189	307	19	214	333	285	151	63	Wexford	
120	170	270	227	280	204	295	254	282	112	55	144	176	181	281	146	265	132	346	240	188	146	75	199	227	109	265	253	340	146	133	84	Wicklow

== See also ==
- Plug-in electric vehicles in the Republic of Ireland
- Public transport in Ireland
- State-sponsored bodies of Ireland
- List of Ireland-related topics
