= Aer Arann Islands =

Irish regional airline

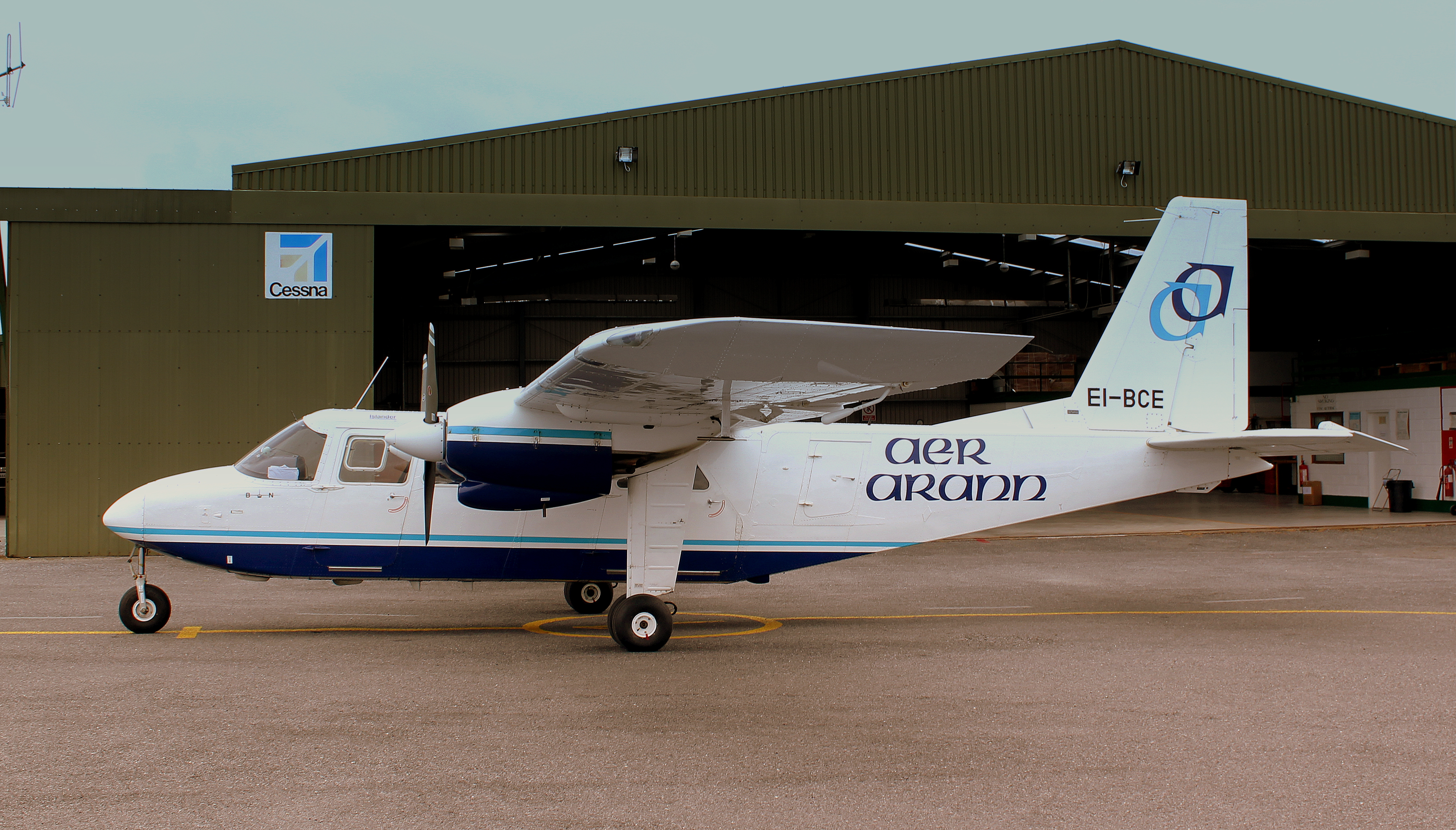
- Britten-Norman Islander BN2A
IATA	ICAO	Call sign
-	-	-
- Founded: 1970 as Galway Aviation Services
- Commenced operations: August 1970 as Aer Arann
- Operating bases: Connemara Airport
- Fleet size: 3
- Destinations: 4
- Headquarters: Connemara Airport, Inverin, County Galway
- Website: aerarannislands.ie

Aer Arann Islands

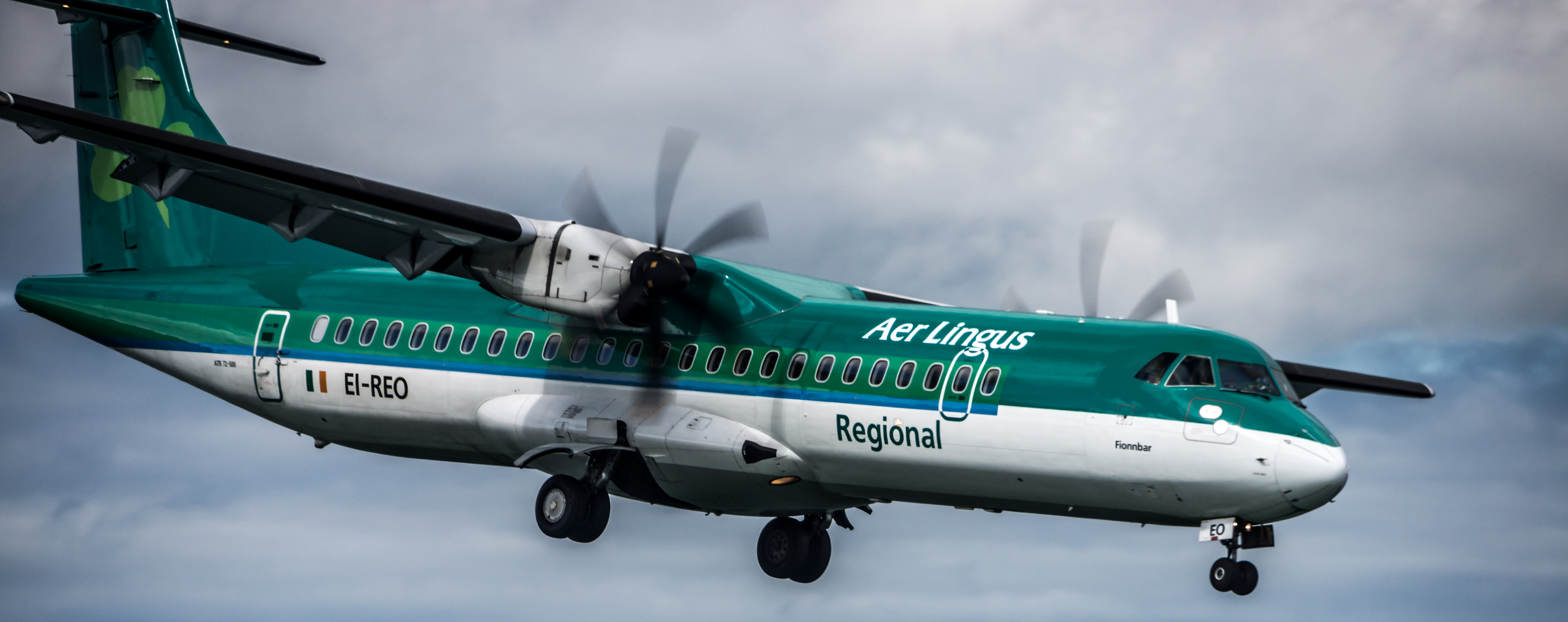
- ATR 72 in Aer Lingus Regional colours
- Founded: 2011 as trademark
- Ceased operations: Defunct - Purchased by Stobart Group consortium and re-branded
- Parent company: Everdeal Holdings Limited
- Key people: Sean Brogan (Chief Executive)
- Website: www.aerarann.com

Aer Arann Islands (stylised as aer arann islands) is an Irish small regional airline headquartered in Inverin, County Galway. It operates a fleet of three Britten-Norman BN-2 Islander aircraft, connecting the Aran Islands with the mainland.

== History ==
The airline's origins go back to 1970 when James Coen, Ralph Langan, and Colie Hernon established Galway Aviation Services to provide an island-hopping service between Galway and Inis Mòr (Aran Islands), off the west coast of Ireland. Operations, using a single Britten-Norman Islander, began on 8 August 1970, immediately branded Aer Arann.

The tiny airline made a number of short-lived expansions, including summer service along the south and west coasts with a Short Sandringham flying boat from Killaloe in the late 1970s, and commuter service between Shannon and Dublin, and to the UK in cooperation with Avair, in the 1980s.

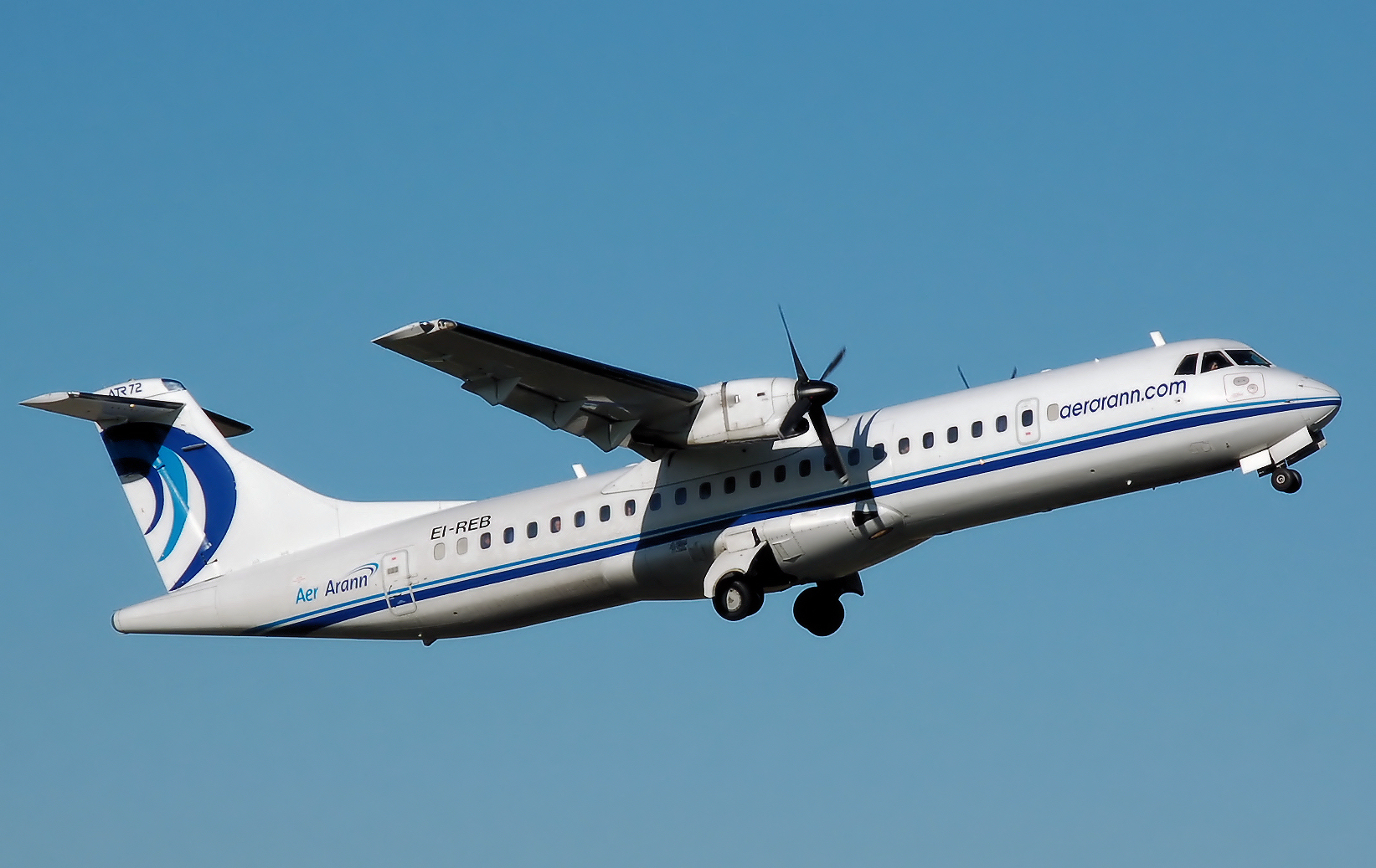
An ATR 72 leased to Aer Arann

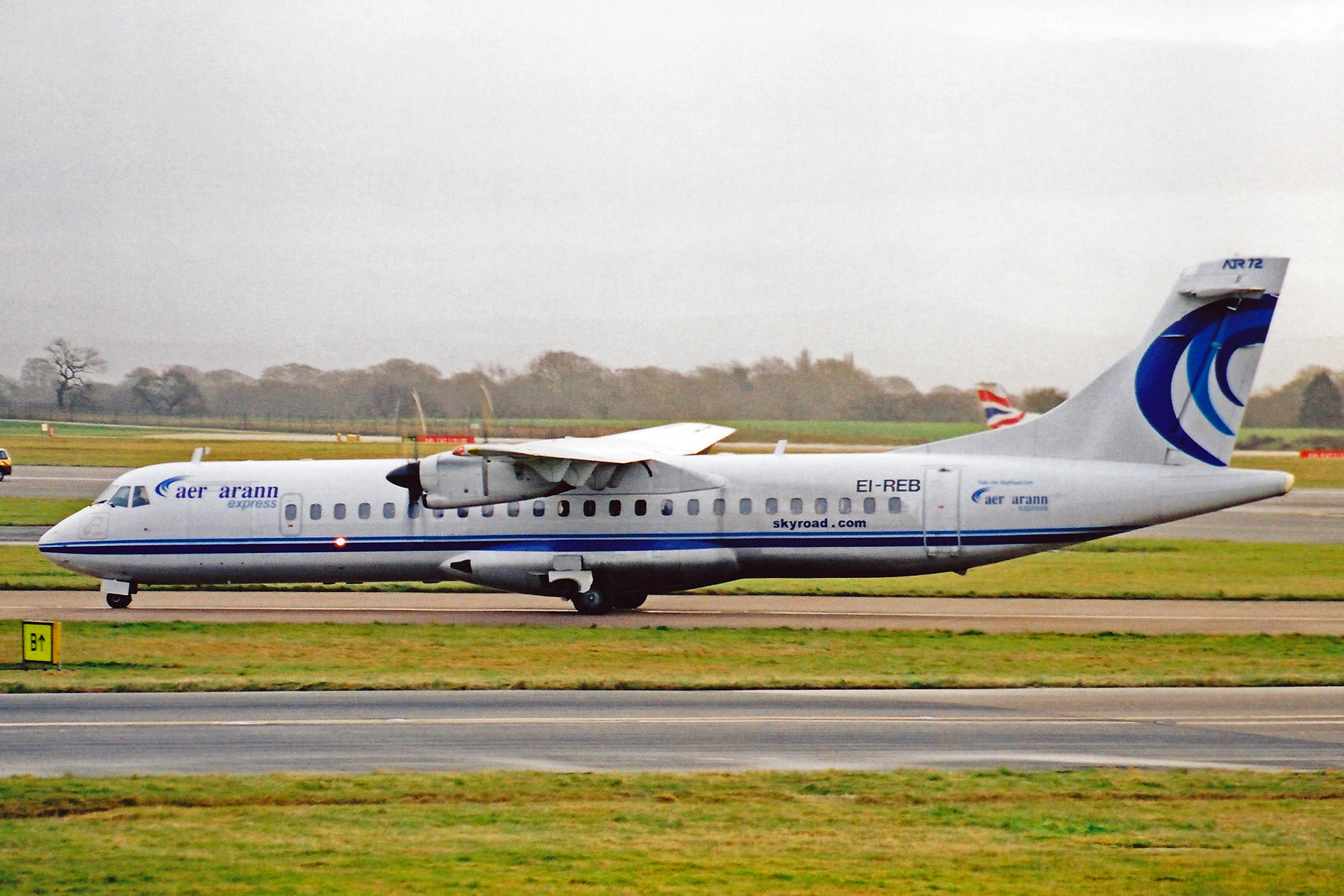
An ATR 72 with Aer Arann Express titles

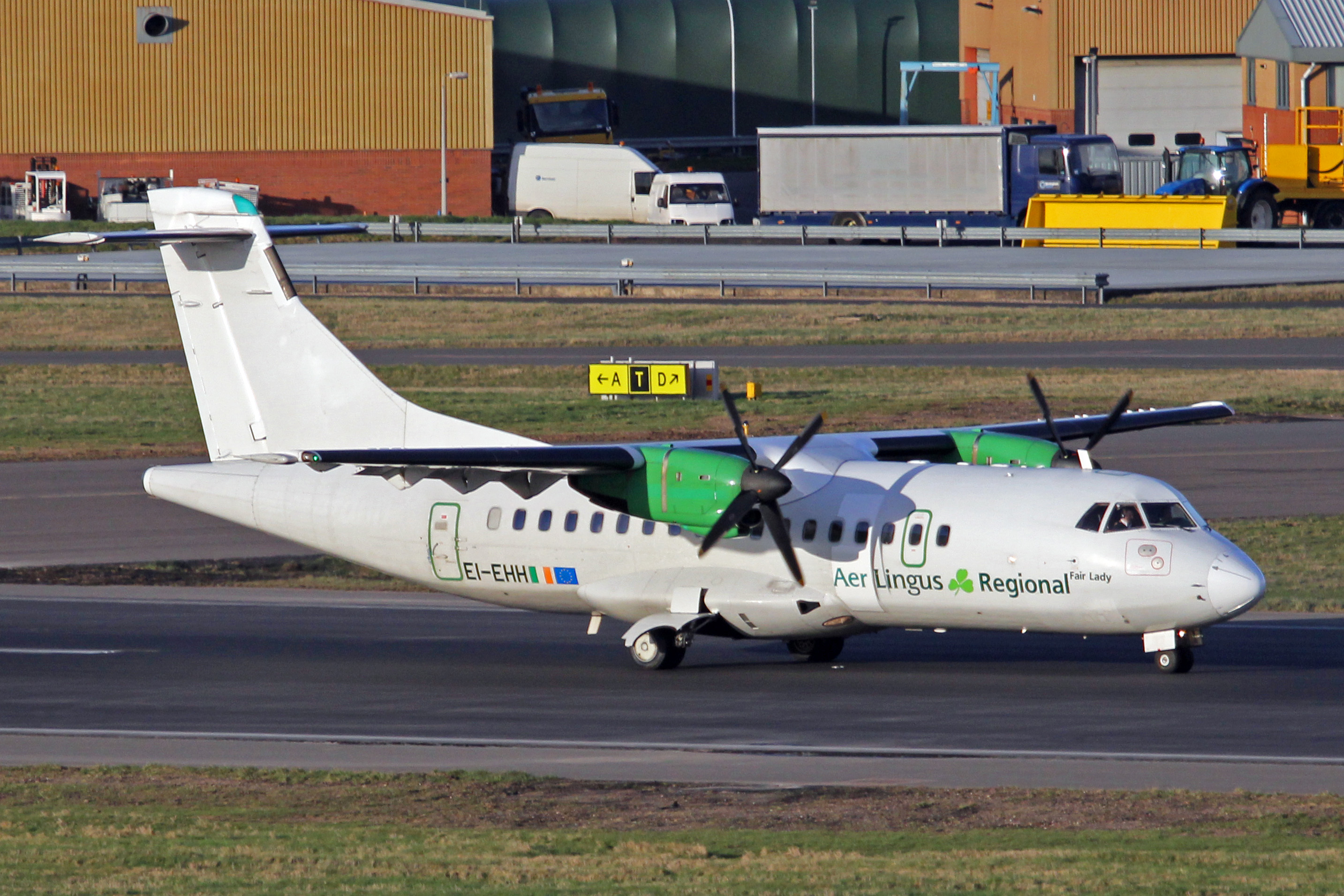
An ATR 42 operated by Aer Lingus

In 1994, Aer Arann was acquired by Pádraig Ó Céidigh and Eugene O'Kelly, who expanded it into a regional airline. In March 1998, the Aer Arann Express brand was launched for wider operations with leased aircraft such as ATR 42, ATR 72, Jetstream 31, Short 330, and Short 360 but they were halted in May 2003. In spring 2000, Aer Arann trading name was abandoned and Aer Arann Regional was adopted from spring 2011 until 2014. PSO domestic flights were performed from 1998 until the Dublin government did not renew the contract for four of the six routes. After a couple of loss-making years the airline recovered but the "ash cloud" of 2010 put an end to the recovery. The Irish High Court allowed the airline to recover, in a process similar to U.S. chapter 11 exit and began the search for a powerful investor. Activities carried out on behalf of the Aer Lingus Regional brand started in January 2010.

After the regional carrier was acquired by logistics Stobart Group in 2014 and changed its name to Stobart Air, the service to the small island was spun off to an independent Aer Arann Islands, a name already used since the early 2000s, remaining owned by Ó Céidigh until 2020.

After Aer Arann Islands failed to win a tender for a four-year contract, the island flight service was threatened with closure on September 30, 2015. This was to be replaced by a helicopter service from Galway Airport. Protests about the airport change and job losses led to this decision being reversed, so Aer Arann Islands continued to fly.

The air carrier is now based at Connemara Airport and operates between 10 and 30 flights to the three Aran islands with an average flight time of eight minutes. Aer Arann Islands confirmed the choice of the Britten-Norman BN.2 Islander aircraft as ideal for this service.

As of January 2020 the airline is under new ownership with plans to develop and maintain the levels of service to both island communities and visitors. In 2022, the airline signed a four-year contract to provide year-round public service obligation (PSO) services from Connemara Airport to all three Aran islands. In August 2024, it was reported that it was evaluating purchasing the 19-seater De Havilland Canada Twin Otter aircraft, a type that had always aroused interest.

== Fleet ==
As of February 2025, Aer Arann Islands operate a fleet of 3 Britten Norman BN-2 aircraft. These are registered EI-AYN, EI-BCE and EI-CUW

Aircraft type	In service	Orders	Passengers	Remarks
Britten-Norman Islander BN2A	2	–	9	
Britten-Norman Islander BN2B	1	–	9	
Total	3	0		

== Destinations ==
	Destination	Airport	Remarks	Refs
Aran Islands	Inis Meáin	Inishmaan Aerodrome		
Aran Islands	Inis Mór	Inishmore Aerodrome		
Aran Islands	Inis Oírr	Inisheer Aerodrome		
Ireland (mainland)	Inverin	Connemara Airport	Base	

== See also ==
- Aer Arann
- List of airlines
- List of airlines of the Republic of Ireland
- Transport in Ireland
- Connemara Airport
- Inishmore Aerodrome
- Inisheer Aerodrome
- Inishmaan Aerodrome
