= Inishmaan Aerodrome =

Airport on island of Inishmaan, Ireland

Inishmaan Aerodrome Aeradróm Inis Meáin
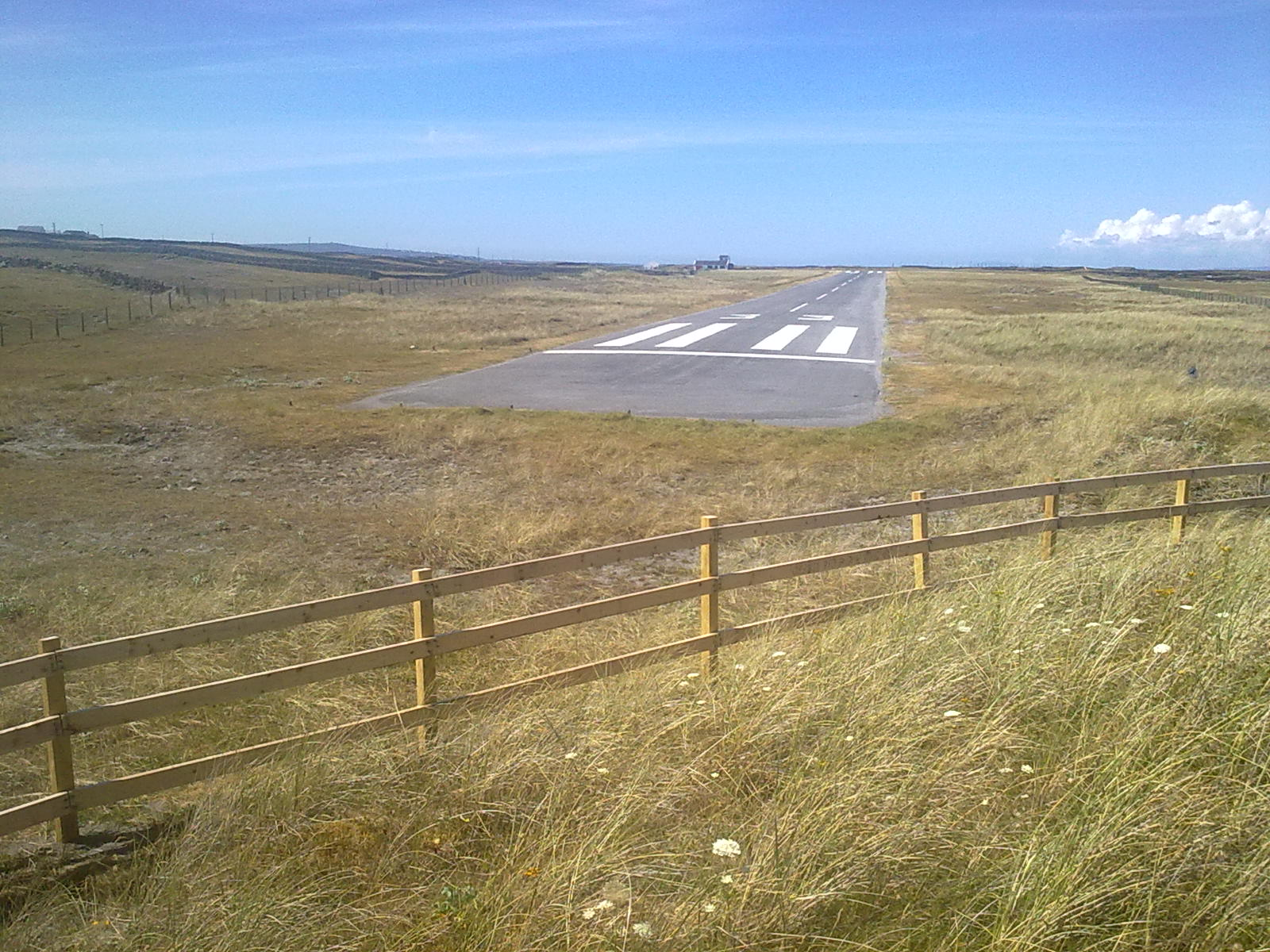
- IATA: IIA; ICAO: EIMN

Summary
- Airport type: Private
- Operator: Comharchumann Inis Meáin
- Serves: Inishmaan, Aran Islands, County Galway, Ireland
- Elevation AMSL: 13 ft / 4 m
- Coordinates: 53°05′31″N 009°34′12″W

Map
- Location of airport in Ireland

Runways
| Direction | Length | | Surface |
| Direction | m | ft | Surface |
|---|---|---|---|
| 15/33 | 534 | 1,752 | Bituminous |
| 05/23 | 265 | 869 | Grass |
- Source: Ireland AIS

Inishmaan Aerodrome (Irish: Aeradróm Inis Meáin) (IATA: IIA, ICAO: EIMN) is located on the island of Inishmaan (Irish: Inis Meáin), one of the Aran Islands in Galway Bay off the coast of County Galway, Ireland. This aerodrome is licensed by the Aeronautical Services Department of the Irish Aviation Authority.

Service to Connemara Airport is provided by Aer Arann Islands, an airline which also serves the other Aran Islands: Inisheer (Irish: Inis Oírr) and Inishmore (Irish: Inis Mór).

In June 2018, the airline announced that it intends to terminate its PSO contract and cease all flights on 6 December 2018, two years before the contract was due to expire. This development was understood, at the time, to be due to a dispute between the airline and the government relating to charges for flights that are not covered by the contract.

== Airlines and destinations ==
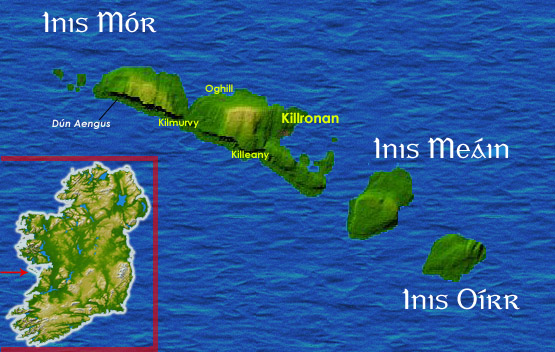
Map of the Aran Islands

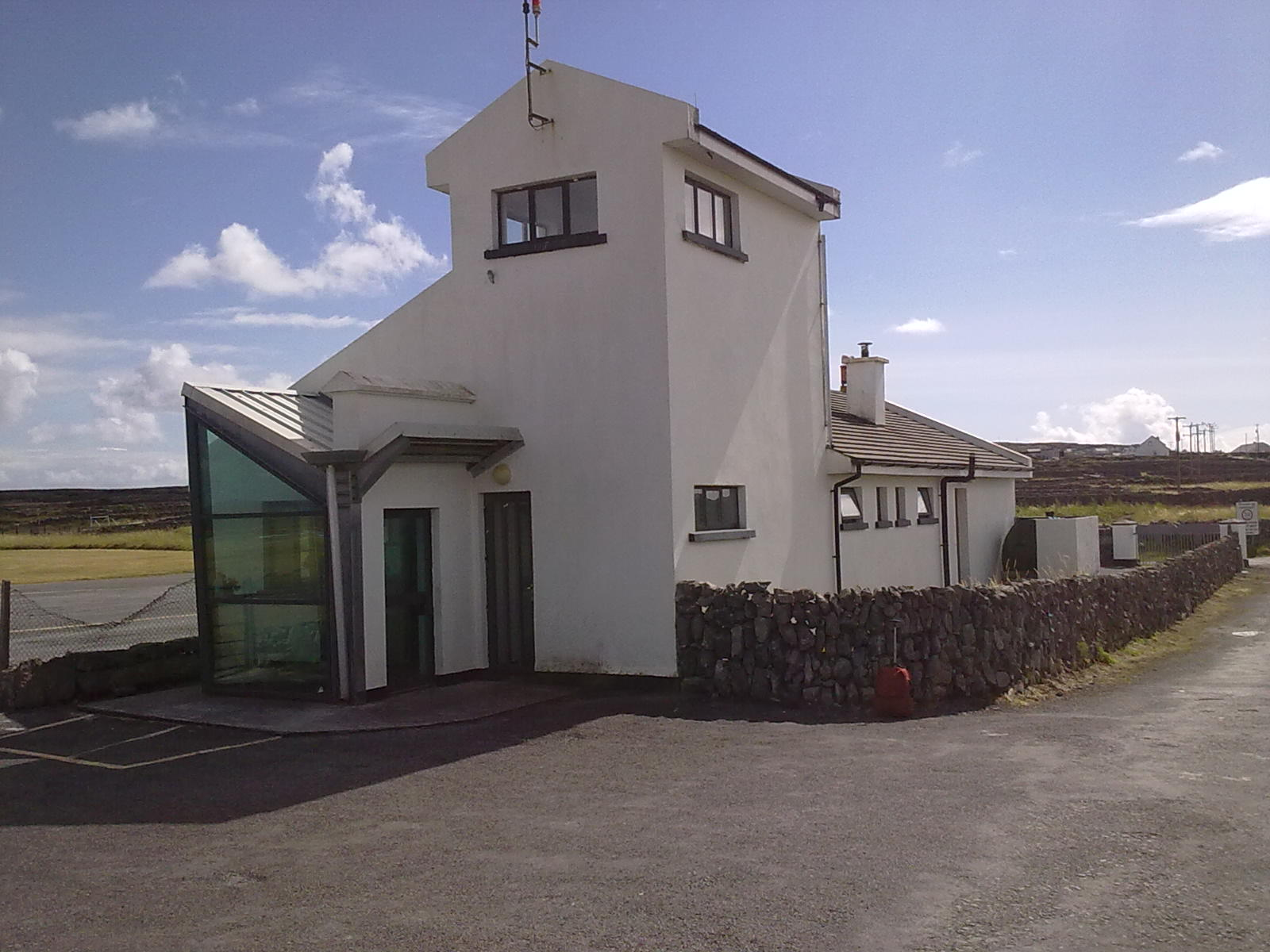
Main building

| Airlines | Destinations |
|---|---|
| Aer Arann Islands | Connemara, Inisheer, Inishmore |

== Facilities ==
Inishmaan Aerodrome resides at an elevation of 13 feet (4 m) above mean sea level. It has two runways: 15/33 has a 534-by-18-metre (1,752 by 59 ft) bituminous pavement and 05/23 has 265-by-20-metre (869 by 66 ft) grass surface.
