= Inisheer Aerodrome =

Inis Oírr Aerodrome Aeradróm Inis Oírr
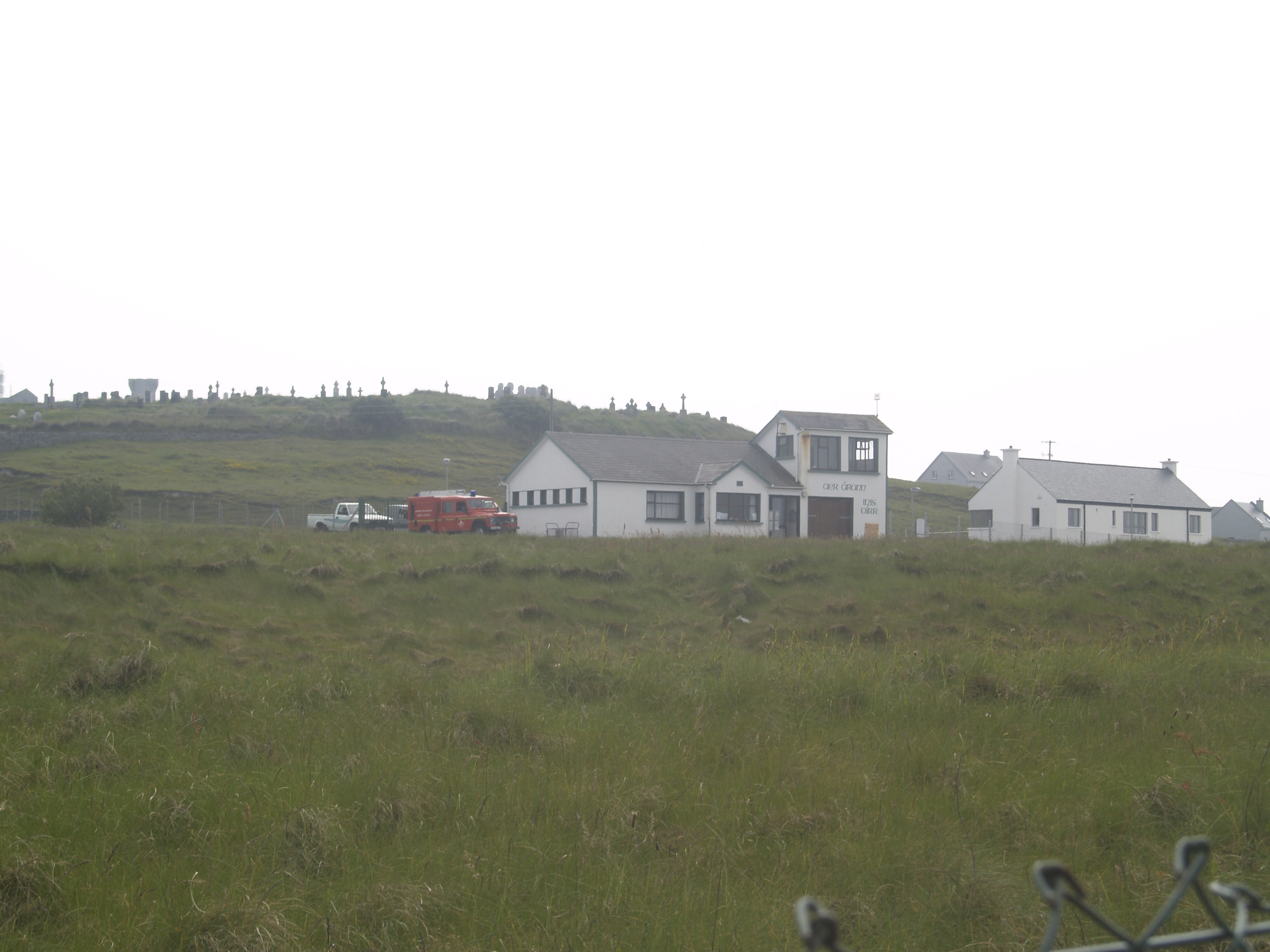
- IATA: INQ; ICAO: EIIR

Summary
- Airport type: Private
- Operator: Comhar Caomhan Teoranta
- Serves: Inisheer, Aran Islands, County Galway, Ireland
- Elevation AMSL: 42 ft / 13 m
- Coordinates: 53°03′52″N 009°30′40″W

Map
- Location of airport in Ireland

Runways
Direction	Length		Surface
Direction	m	ft	Surface
13/31	520	1,706	Bituminous
- Source: Ireland AIS

Inisheer Aerodrome (Irish: Aeradróm Inis Oírr) (IATA: INQ, ICAO: EIIR) is located on the island of Inisheer (Irish: Inis Oírr), one of the Aran Islands in Galway Bay off the coast of County Galway, Ireland. This aerodrome is licensed by the Aeronautical Services Department of the Irish Aviation Authority.

Service to Connemara Airport is provided by Aer Arann Islands, an airline which also serves the other Aran Islands: Inishmaan (Irish: Inis Meáin) and Inishmore (Irish: Inis Mór).

In June 2018, the airline announced that it intends to terminate its PSO contract and cease all flights on 6 December 2018, two years before the contract was due to expire. This development is understood to be due to a dispute between the airline and the government relating to charges for flights that are not covered by the contract.

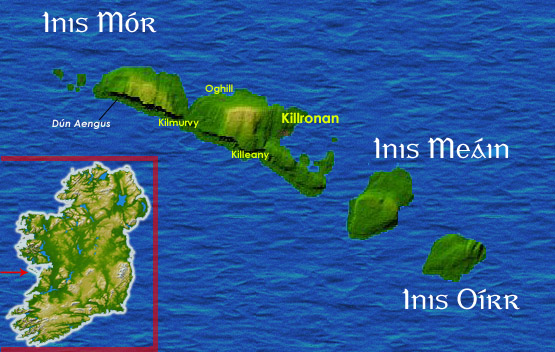
Map of the Aran Islands

== Airlines and destinations ==
Airlines	Destinations
Aer Arann Islands	Connemara, Inishmaan, Inishmore

== Facilities ==
Inisheer Aerodrome resides at an elevation of 42 feet (13 m) above mean sea level. It has one runway designated 13/31 with a bituminous pavement measuring 520 by 18 m (1,706 by 59 ft).
