= Birr Aerodrome =

Small airfield in County Offaly, Ireland

Birr Aerodrome Aeradróm Bhiorra
- IATA: none; ICAO: EIBR

Summary
- Airport type: Private
- Operator: Ormond Flying Club
- Serves: Birr
- Location: Birr, County Offaly, Ireland
- Elevation AMSL: 250 ft (76 m)
- Coordinates: 53°04′15″N 007°53′55″W

Maps
- Location of airport in Ireland
- Interactive map of Birr Aerodrome

Runways
Direction	Length		Surface
Direction	m	ft	Surface
18/36	570	1,870	Grass
- Source: Irish AIS

Birr Airfield is located 1 NM (1.9 km; 1.2 mi) south of the town of Birr in County Offaly in Ireland. It was originally called Birr View Air Strip. The area for many years has been closely linked with aviation, dating from the time of the British Army air strip which was very near the present air field. The Ormand Flying Club has been in operation at Birr Airfield for over 30 years; it is a Registered Training Facility for the EASA LAPL and IAA PPL and LAPL licences.

The airfield first opened in August 1970, and was the first licenced landing strip in the Midlands. There is one landing strip at Birr which is oriented north/south. Construction of a hangar was completed in 2010, which allows overnight storage of aircraft with avgas and mogas facilities on site. The field is open to the public, and there are no landing fees.
