= Bantry Aerodrome =

Small airfield in County Cork, Ireland

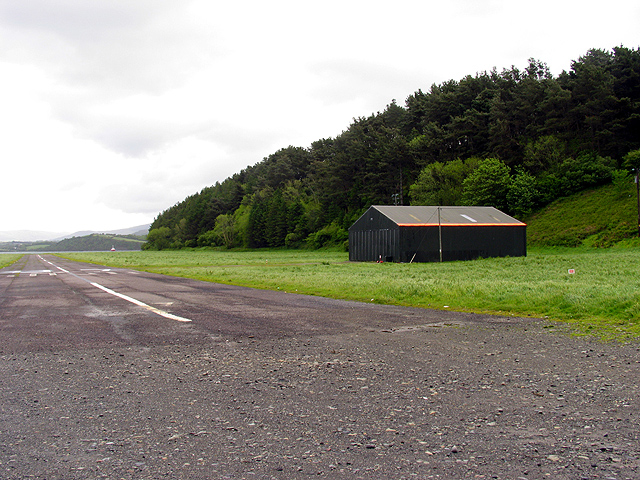
- IATA: BYT; ICAO: EIBN

Summary
- Airport type: Private
- Operator: ROWA Pharmaceuticals Ltd
- Location: Bantry
- Elevation AMSL: 7 ft / 2 m
- Coordinates: 51°40′08″N 009°29′04″W

Map
- Location of airport in Ireland

Runways
Direction	Length		Surface
Direction	m	ft	Surface
07/25	390	1,280	Bitumen
- Source: Irish AIS

Bantry Aerodrome is a small privately owned airfield 1.5 NM (2.8 km; 1.7 mi) west south-west of Bantry in County Cork, Ireland. It was constructed in the 1970s by the Rowa Pharmaceutical Corporation.

The landing strip is near the coast, with both runway ends less than hundred metres away from the water. The nearest international airports are Cork Airport to the East, and Kerry Airport in Farranfore, County Kerry to the North.
