= Connemara Airport =

Airport in Connemara, Ireland

Connemara Airport Aerfort Chonamara
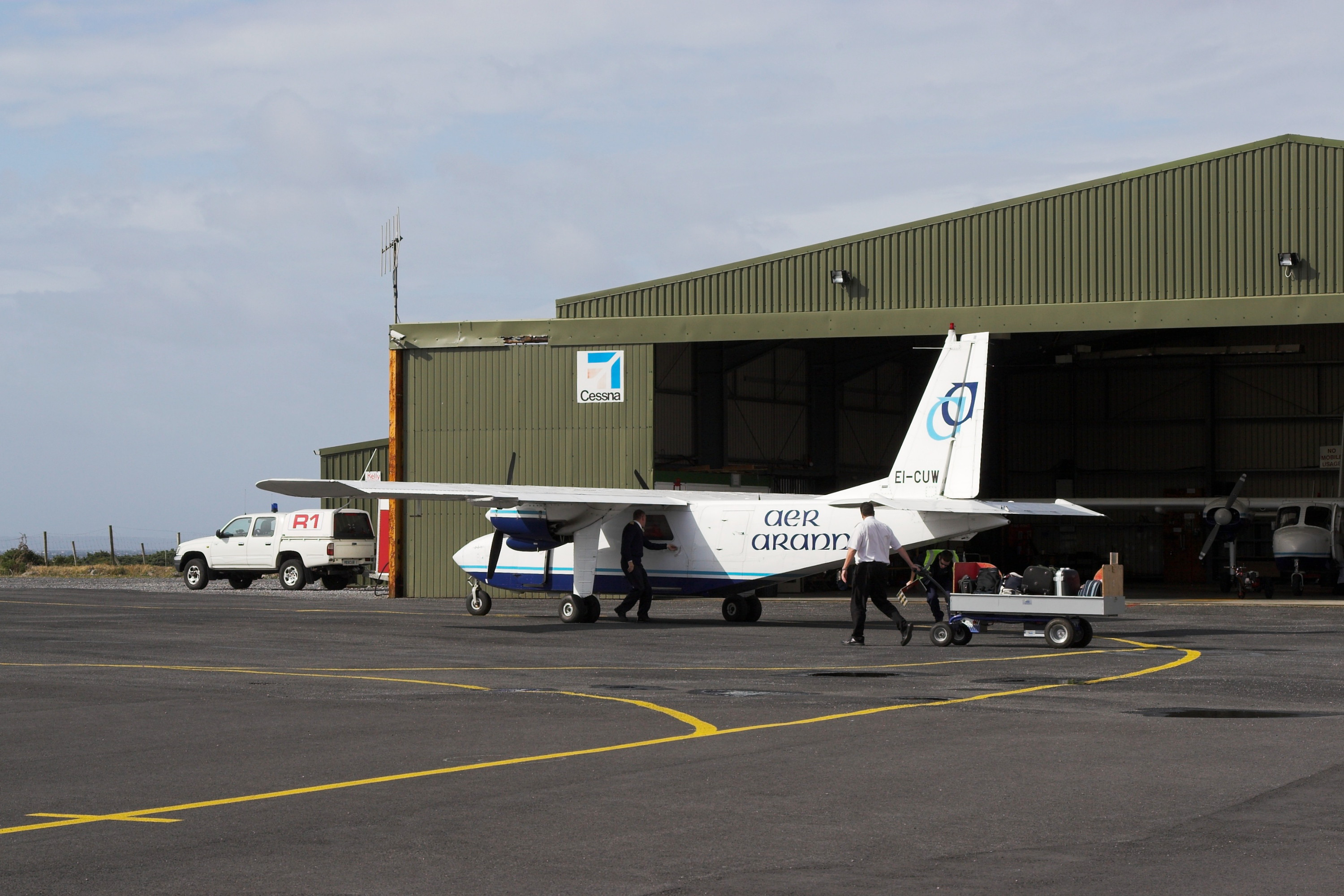
- IATA: NNR; ICAO: EICA

Summary
- Airport type: Private
- Owner: Department of Rural and Community Development
- Operator: Galway Aviation Services Ltd.
- Serves: Connemara
- Location: Inverin, Galway
- Elevation AMSL: 70 ft (21 m)
- Coordinates: 53°13′50″N 009°28′04″W

Map
- Location of airport in Ireland

Runways
Direction	Length		Surface
Direction	m	ft	Surface
05/23	600	1,969	Bitumen
- Source: Irish AIS

Connemara Airport (Irish: Aerphort Chonamara) or Connemara Regional Airport (Irish: Aerfort Réigiúnach Chonamara)) (IATA: NNR, ICAO: EICA) is located at Inverin in the Connemara region of Ireland, 15 nautical miles (28 km; 17 mi) west of the city of Galway. It is also known as Spiddal Airport, Inverin Airport, or Minna Airport (Irish: Aerfort na Minne), a name also used by Minna Airport in Minna, Nigeria.

The airport was constructed in 1992, partly funded by Údarás na Gaeltachta (the development agency for the Gaeltacht) to help ensure the viability of the Aran Islands communities.

Aer Arann Islands operates Britten-Norman Islander aircraft to the Aran Islands of Inisheer (Irish: Inis Oírr), Inishmaan (Irish: Inis Meáin) and Inishmore (Irish: Inis Mór) off the coast of County Galway in Ireland.

== Airlines and destinations ==
Airlines	Destinations
Aer Arann Islands	Inisheer, Inishmaan, Inishmore

== Statistics ==
Passenger numbers
Year	Passenger numbers	% Change YoY
2013	20,354	
2014	19,236	▼5.5%
2015	19,753	▲2.7%
2016	21,345	▲8.1%
2017	16,437	▼23.0%
2018	15,322	▼6.8%
2019	15,382	▲0.4%
2020	8,900	▼42.1%
2021		
2022		
2023		

== Accidents and incidents ==
- On 5 July 2007 a Cessna 208 crashed on approach to the airport due to rough weather conditions, killing two and injuring seven. The plane was a charter plane, and was returning from a day trip to Inis Meáin.
