= Trim Aerodrome =

Trim Aerodrome Trim Airfield
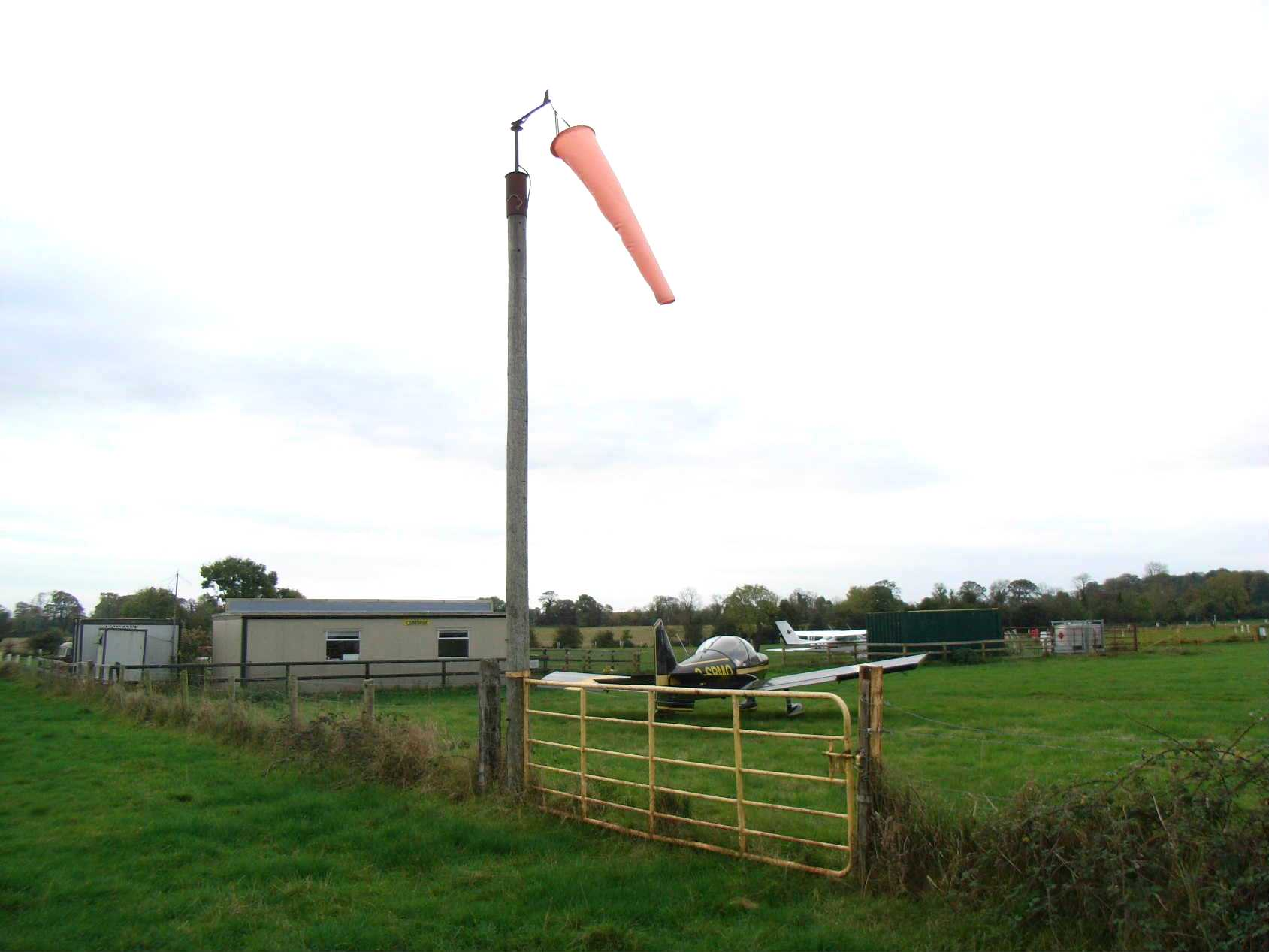
- IATA: none; ICAO: EITM

Summary
- Airport type: Private
- Operator: P. Murphy
- Location: Trim, County Meath, Ireland
- Elevation AMSL: 200 ft / 61 m
- Coordinates: 53°34′30″N 006°44′19″W

Map
- Location of airport in Ireland

Runways
Direction	Length		Surface
Direction	m	ft	Surface
10/28	560	1,837	Grass
- Source: Irish AIS

Trim Aerodrome is located 2 nautical miles (3.7 km; 2.3 mi) north-east of Trim, a town in County Meath, Ireland. The airfield has one runway, 10/28 which is 560 by 12 m (1,837 by 39 ft).

Trim Flying Club, a Registered Training Facility (RTF), is based at the aerodrome and operates two aircraft. The airfield is also home to other general aviation aircraft including microlights.
