= Inishmore Aerodrome =

Airport on island of Inishmore, Ireland

Inishmore Aerodrome Aeradróm Inis Mór
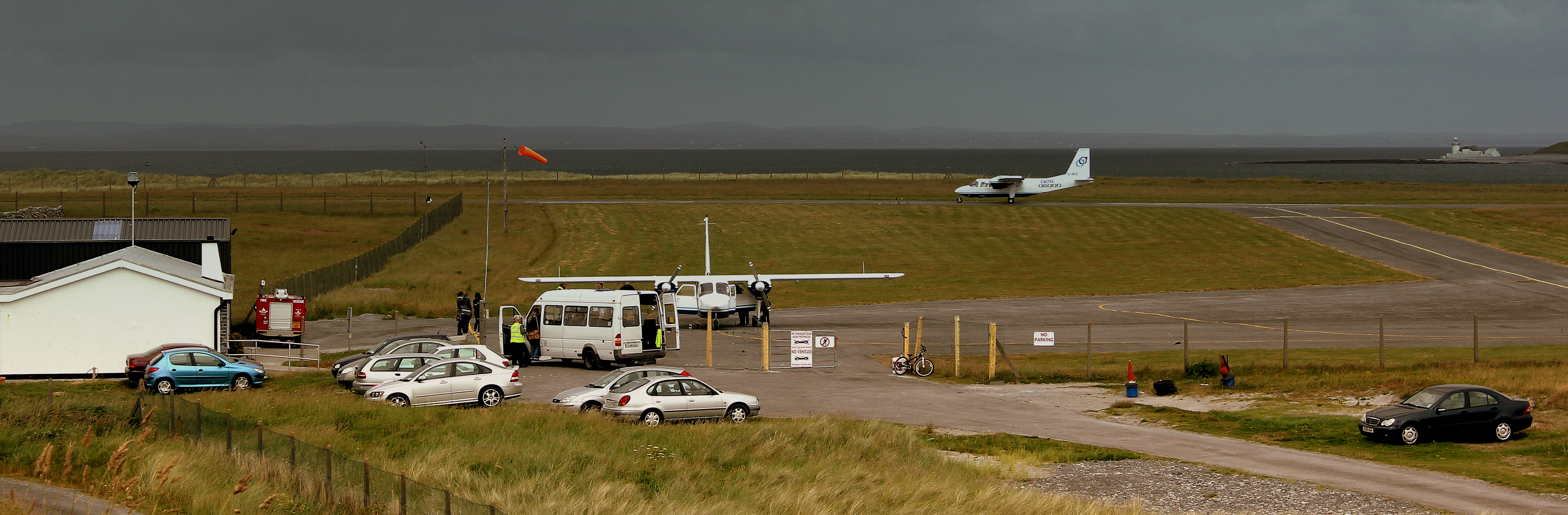
- IATA: IOR; ICAO: EIIM

Summary
- Airport type: Private
- Operator: Údarás na Gaeltachta Na Forbacha
- Serves: Inishmore, Aran Islands, County Galway, Ireland
- Location: Kilronan
- Elevation AMSL: 24 ft / 7 m
- Coordinates: 53°06′25″N 009°39′14″W

Map
- Location of airport in Ireland

Runways
Direction	Length		Surface
Direction	m	ft	Surface
14/32	490	1,608	Bitumen
- Source: Ireland AIS

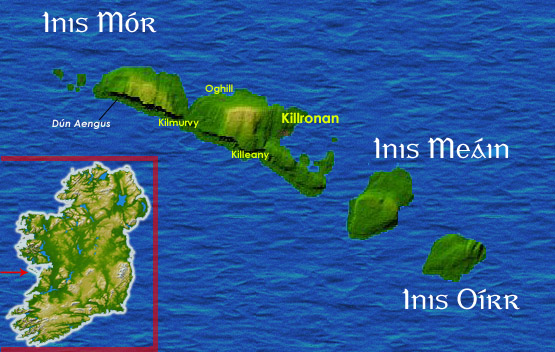
Map of the Aran Islands

Inishmore Aerodrome (Irish: Aeradróm Inis Mór) (IATA: IOR, ICAO: EIIM) is located 1 nautical mile (1.9 km; 1.2 mi) southeast of Kilronan (Irish: Cill Rónáin), a town on the island of Inishmore (Irish: Inis Mór), one of the Aran Islands off the coast of County Galway in Ireland. It has one paved runway designated 14/32 which measures 490 by 18 m (1,608 by 59 ft).

Service to Connemara Airport is provided by Aer Arann Islands, an airline which also serves the other Aran Islands: Inisheer (Irish: Inis Oírr) and Inishmaan (Irish: Inis Meáin).

In 2018, the airline announced its intention to cease operations at the airport, but an agreement was reached to continue the service, and the service continued to operate as of 2020.

== Airlines and destinations ==
Airlines	Destinations
Aer Arann Islands	Connemara, Inisheer, Inishmaan

== Statistics ==
Passenger numbers
Year	Passenger numbers	% Change YoY
2013	12,393	
2014	11,491	▼7.3%
2015	12,071	▲5.0%
2016	12,667	▲4.9%
2017	9,335	▼26.3%
2018	8,814	▼5.6%
2019	8,831	▲0.2%
2020	5,020	▼43.2%
2021		
2022		
2023		
