= Britannia Airways =

Charter airline of the United Kingdom (1961–2005)

Britannia Airways Limited

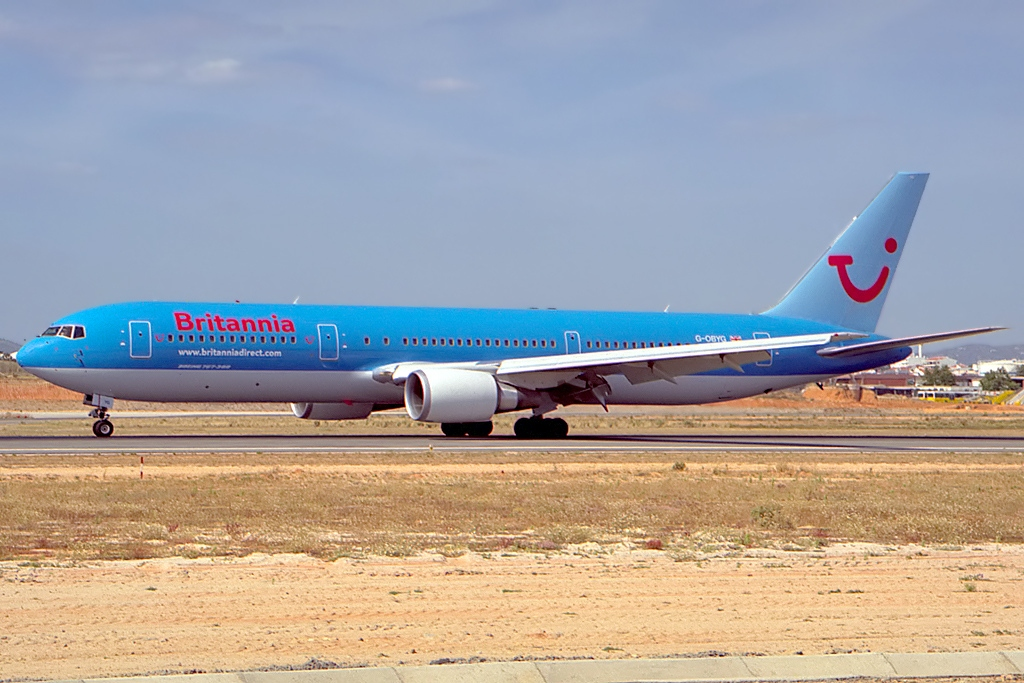
- Boeing 767-304ER
IATA	ICAO	Call sign
EY (1961–1964); BY (1964–2005)	—; BAL (1964–2005)	EURAVIA (1961–1964); BRITANNIA (1964–2005)
- Founded: 1 December 1961(as Euravia (London) Limited)
- Commenced operations: 5 May 1962 (as Euravia (London) Limited); 16 August 1964 (as Britannia Airways Limited)
- Ceased operations: 16 August 1964 (as Euravia (London) Limited); 1 November 2005 (as Britannia Airways Limited; merged into Thomsonfly)
- Operating bases: Birmingham; Bristol; Cardiff; Edinburgh; Glasgow; East Midlands; Leeds/Bradford; Liverpool; London–Gatwick; London–Luton; London–Stansted; Manchester; Newcastle upon Tyne
- Subsidiaries: Skyways of London in 1962
- Parent company: TUI
- Headquarters: Britannia House, Luton, Bedfordshire, England
- Founders: T.E.D. Langton; J.E.D. Williams

Britannia Airways was a charter airline based in the United Kingdom. It was founded in 1961 as Euravia and became the world's largest holiday airline. Britannia's main bases were at London Gatwick, London Stansted, London Luton, Cardiff, Bristol, East Midlands, Birmingham, Manchester, Newcastle upon Tyne, Leeds/Bradford, Liverpool and Glasgow. It had its headquarters at Britannia House in Luton.

Britannia was originally a charter operator for Universal Sky Tours and later for Thomson holidays where it became the in-house airline with a fleet of Boeing jet aircraft. In 2000, Thomson Travel Group, and thereby Britannia Airways, were acquired by TUI Group of Germany and operations merged into the German airline on 1 May 2002. As part of a wider reorganisation of TUI's UK operations in September 2004, Britannia was rebranded Thomsonfly.

== History ==
=== Origins ===
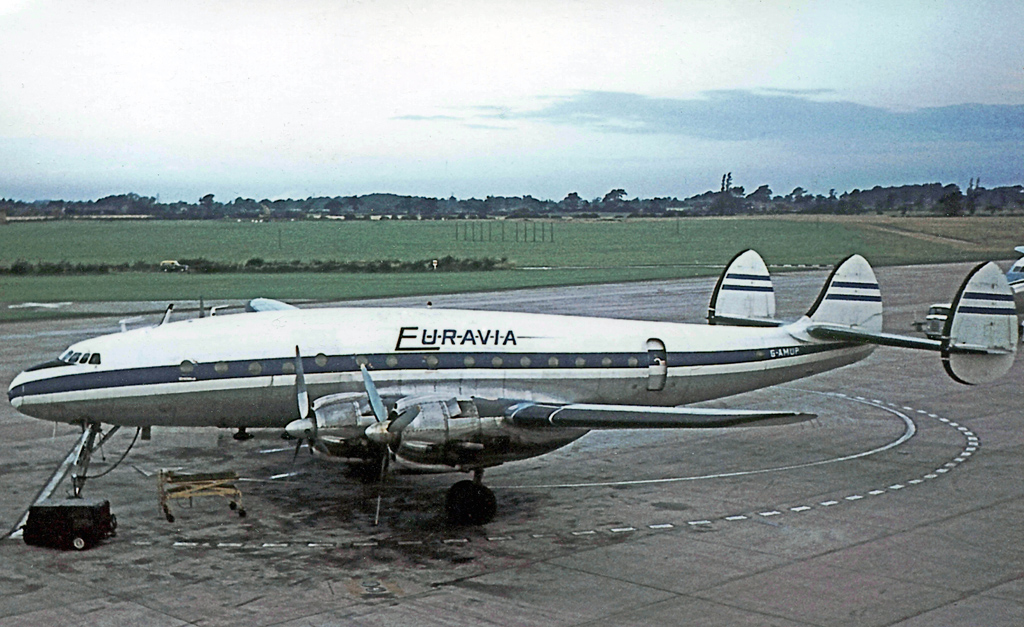
Euravia Lockheed Constellation at Manchester Airport in 1964

The airline was established as Euravia (London) Ltd. by British businessman T.E.D. Langton and aviation consultant J.E.D. Williams on 1 December 1961. It was founded at a time of considerable turmoil for the independent sector of the British air operators industry, during the early 1960s, several firms suffered from severe financial hardship and were even driven into bankruptcy. Upon deciding to launch operations, the company quickly obtained the necessary licences from the Air Transport Licensing Board, airworthiness certificates for its aircraft from the Air Registration Board, and an Air Operator's Certificate from the Ministry of Aviation. These applications were not without some difficulty as Euravia had the distinction of being refused more licences than any other two airlines put together; this was due to the fact that the firm placed a larger number of applications than any British airline, except for British United Airways (BUA).

On 1 April 1962, Euravia established its initial operating base at Luton Airport; on 13 April, the airline's first aircraft, a Lockheed Constellation, was delivered for certification and training. Early on, Euravia benefitted from its close association with inclusive tour holiday company Universal Sky Tours. On 5 May 1962, Euravia commenced flight operations, using an initial batch of three Constellations to perform flights on behalf of Universal Sky Tours. Within ten days, the operation was reportedly breaking-even; by a month later, the firm's initial fleet was operating at its maximum planned utilisation rate.

On 5 October of that same year, a rival charter airline Skyways, one of Britain's foremost independent airlines during the 1950s and early 1960s, was taken over by Euravia and integrated into its operations. The Skyways takeover did not include Skyways Coach-Air, a Skyways associate, established in the early 1950s by Eric Rylands to operate low-fare coach-air services between London and several European capital cities. Following Euravia's acquisition of Skyways, Skyways Coach-Air remained independent until its successor Skyways International was taken over by Dan-Air in 1972.. Skyways scheduled operations were kept running until April 1964.

By 15 June 1963, Euravia was operating a mixed fleet of eight Constellations and four Avro Yorks. Euravia also took on Skyways Pan Am engine contract at London Heathrow using ex-Skyways Yorks; under this arrangement, one of these aircraft was on permanent standby at Heathrow ready to fly a spare jet engine to rescue any Pan Am Boeing 707 jetliner that encountered engine problems. These rescue flights were flown as far afield as Singapore and Hong Kong. The other Yorks were used for ad hoc freighting until 1965 when the last aircraft G-AGNV was flown from Luton to Staverton, Gloucester to be an exhibit at the now defunct Skyfame museum. Upon retirement, this aircraft was preserved and placed on display at the RAF Museum Midlands, Cosford.

=== Britannia Airways ===
On 16 August 1964, the airline changed corporate name, becoming Britannia Airways Ltd.. This name was adopted to coincide with re-equipping with ex-British Overseas Airways Corporation (BOAC) Bristol Britannia 102 turboprop airliners to replace the Constellations. The livery included an emblem of Britannia, the national personification of Britain. Bristol Britannia would not be used for long however; during December 1970, the last remaining aircraft was withdrawn from service, consequently, the airline became an all-jet operator at this point. During the late 1960s, Britannia became the first charter airline to offer assigned seating, as well as hot in-flight meals.

During the mid-1960s, Britannia had attracted the interest of the newspaper business magnate Lord Thomson, who sought a good prospect with which to diversify his business stakes; Thomson also approved of the company's activities being beneficial to the general public. As a result of this interest, during 1965, Britannia became part of Thomson, itself part of the Canadian-owned International Thomson Organisation. This acquisition was beneficial to the company's prospects, including financing the acquisition of a new generation of jet-powered airliners to enable Britannia's rapid transition into the jet age.

During 1968, Britannia commenced a re-equipment effort involving the new Boeing 737-200 jetliner; it had the distinction of being the first European airline to operate the type. The purchase of the brand new and relatively unproved 737 was seen as a major breach of traditional practice; historically, charter airliners procured secondhand aircraft from their larger scheduled airlines. In addition, the large 'flag carriers' were comparatively wary of the value of jet-powered aircraft, normally opting for comfort and high-quality passenger conditions over speeds. This unconventional purchase was also politically controversial; Sir George Edwards, the chairman of the British Aircraft Corporation (BAC), had expected Britannia to order the rival BAC One-Eleven and lobbied government officials to convince the airline to procure the British airliner instead. These pressure tactics ultimately proved to be unsuccessful; by 1975, Britannia was operating a fleet of 13 Boeing 737s.

By 1972, the airline had become the largest of the British independent charter airlines. Prior to the mid-1970s, Britannia, much like other British charter airlines of the era, had concentrated upon low-cost flights to Spain and the use of provincial airports (other than its Luton base) to provide its services. However, the company held ambitions to expand beyond this. In May 1985 some of the more successful routes became scheduled links. During 1988, Britannia's 767s were used to commence regular charter flights between Britain and Australia, as well as to New Zealand the following year. Between 1968 and 1984, Britannia carried nearly 42 million passengers, while the company's fleet grew to include twenty-nine Boeing 737s and a pair of 767s.

Britannia also became the first European airline to fly the Boeing 767, which was added to its fleet in the 1980s; the 767 was the first widebodied aircraft to enter service in the company's fleet and enabled Britannia to become the first British holiday airline to offer passengers free in-flight audio and video entertainment.

During August 1988, Britannia's immediate parent company, the Thomson Travel Group, purchased Horizon Travel and its airline, Orion Airways, which was then integrated into Britannia.

=== Later years ===
During the 1990s, Britannia also began to operate services for Skytours and Portland Direct, themselves also part of the Thomson Group. During this time, Britannia heavily modernised its fleet and expanded its route network to holiday destinations in Asia, Canada, South Africa, and the United States. During 1997, 34 per cent of Britannia's flights were flown to long-haul destinations. By the summer of 1998, Britannia's operations, which were by then centered around Germany, Scandinavia, and the United Kingdom, operated a mixed fleet of three Airbus A320s, a single Boeing 737-800, 24 757s and 13 767s.

Several efforts were made at European expansion during this time. During 1997, Britannia formed a wholly owned subsidiary, Britannia GmbH, based in Germany to operate long and short-haul flights from airports in Germany, Switzerland and Austria for German tour operators, flying several 767-300s. On 3 November 1997, the subsidiary's inaugural flight was flown, flying between Berlin and the Dominican Republic. At one point, Britannia Airways GmbH employed roughly 200 people and operated 4 Boeing 767-300s; however, this division was successful (more than 1 million passengers per year) but closed down during March 2001 due to the TUI acquisition. During early 1998, the Thomson Travel Group also acquired the Scandinavian holiday operation, Fritidsresor Group, along with its airline Blue Scandinavia, which was later renamed Britannia Nordic (since rebranded as TUI fly Nordic).

In addition, it was during this decade that Britannia launched several public image and service quality initiatives, such as the flying with confidence course and closer customer service coordination within Thomson. During the early 1990s, the airline launched its in-flight Royal Service brand to increase the profile of the company's high-end services, somewhat akin to the premium service levels available on scheduled airlines. It was succeeded by a newer brand, 360, during the late 1990s; this service was billed as being less old-fashioned and possessed greater personality.

During 2000, Thomson Travel Group, and thereby Britannia Airways, were acquired by TUI Group of Germany. As part of a wider reorganisation of TUI's UK operations in September 2004, it was announced that Britannia would be rebranded. On 1 May 2002 The airline operations were merged into those of Thomson future airline but Britannia name officially disappeared on 9 May 2005 with full integration into Thomsonfly (TUI UK) on the following 1 November.

== Competitors ==
At the time of rebranding, Britannia was the largest charter airline in the United Kingdom, its position of market dominance being owed to the growth of Thomson Holidays. Initially its main competitor was British Airtours. The 1980s saw the growth of Monarch Airlines as a credible competitor. In the 1990s Air 2000, Airtours International, First Choice Airways and Flying Colours Airlines grew as competitors. Its main competitor at the time of rebranding was Thomas Cook Airlines.

== Destinations ==
As of January 1995, Britannia Airways operated services to the following international scheduled destinations:

- Europe
  - Alicante
  - Almería
  - Amsterdam
  - Bodrum
  - Brussels
  - Bucharest
  - Budapest
  - Copenhagen
  - Corfu
  - Dalaman
  - Düsseldorf
  - Frankfurt
  - Faro
  - Fuerteventura
  - Funchal
  - Geneva
  - Girona
  - Gothenburg
  - Gran Canaria
  - Hamburg
  - Hanover
  - Heraklion
  - Ibiza
  - Kos
  - Larnaca
  - Lviv
  - Lyon
  - Málaga
  - Malta
  - Menorca
  - Munich
  - Oslo
  - Palma de Mallorca
  - Paphos
  - Paris
  - Plovdiv
  - Prague
  - Reus
  - Rhodes
  - Salzburg
  - Santa Cruz de la Palma
  - Sofia
  - Stavanger
  - Stockholm
  - Tenerife
  - Thessaloniki
  - Toulouse
  - Turin
  - Verona
  - Warsaw
- Middle East
  - Bahrain
  - Abu Dhabi

only for Full stop over

- North & South America
  - Acapulco
  - Barbados
  - Cancún
  - Montego Bay
  - Natal
  - Orlando
  - Puerto Plata
  - Puerto Vallarta
  - Punta Cana
  - St Lucia
  - Varadero
- Africa
  - Accra
  - Hurghada
  - Luxor
  - Mombasa
  - Monastir
  - Sharm el Sheikh
- Asia
  - Goa
  - Malé
- Oceania
  - Auckland
  - Sydney

== Fleet ==
Britannia Airways fleet included of the following aircraft:

Aircraft	Total	Capacity	Notes
Bristol Britannia 102	10	112	2 leased; 1 lost in accident
Boeing 707-320	2	189	leased
Boeing 737-200	45	130	Last 737-200 "'G-BGYJ" left the fleet 30 March 1994.
Boeing 737-300	7	148	Last 737-300 "G-BLKB" left the fleet 11 April 1993.
Boeing 737-800	2	189	Last 737-800 "PH-ABE" left the fleet 9 January 2002. Transferred to sister company "Britannia Airways Sweden" as SE-DZM.
Boeing 757-200	28	235	Most aircraft transferred to Thomsonfly. G-BYAG written off after crash landing at Girona Airport.
Boeing 767-200ER	13	290	Last aircraft "G-BRIG" transferred to Thomsonfly 1 November 2005.
Boeing 767-300ER	12	283-326	Last aircraft "G-OBYD" transferred to Thomsonfly 31 October 2005.
Airbus A320-200	6	140-170	Leased from TransAer between 1998 and 2000.
Lockheed L-1011 TriStar	1	400	Leased from Air Atlanta Icelandic between July and December 1998.
Airbus A300	3	210-250	Inherited from Orion Airways. Never flew under the Britannia branding.

== Britannia Airways images gallery ==
In order of livery and size

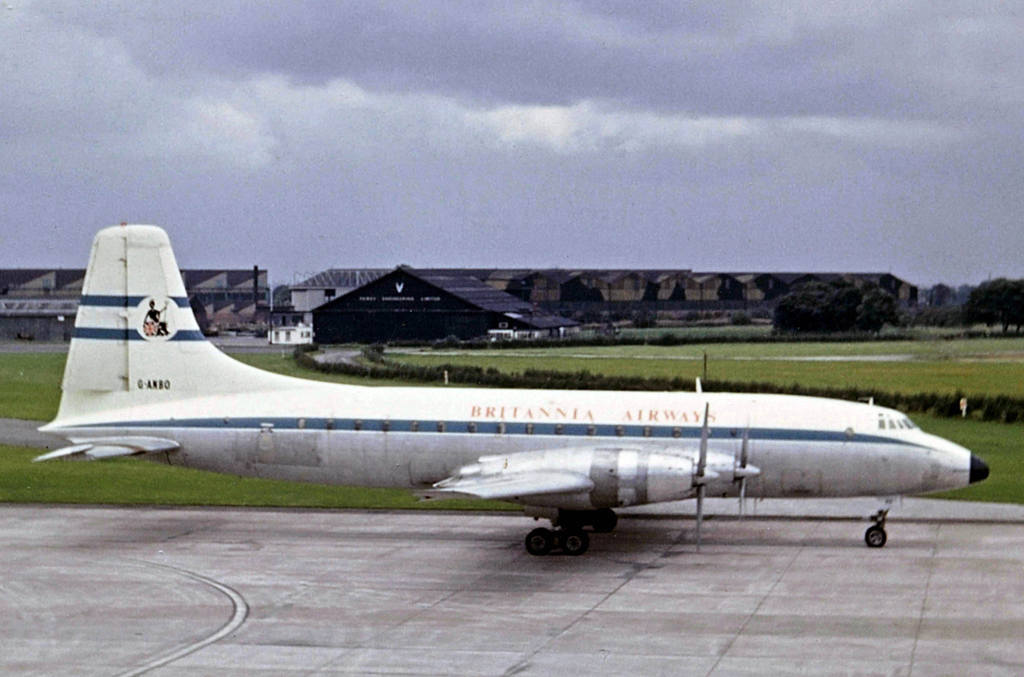
Bristol Britannia 102 at Manchester Airport in 1965

Bristol Britannia 102 in late 1960s

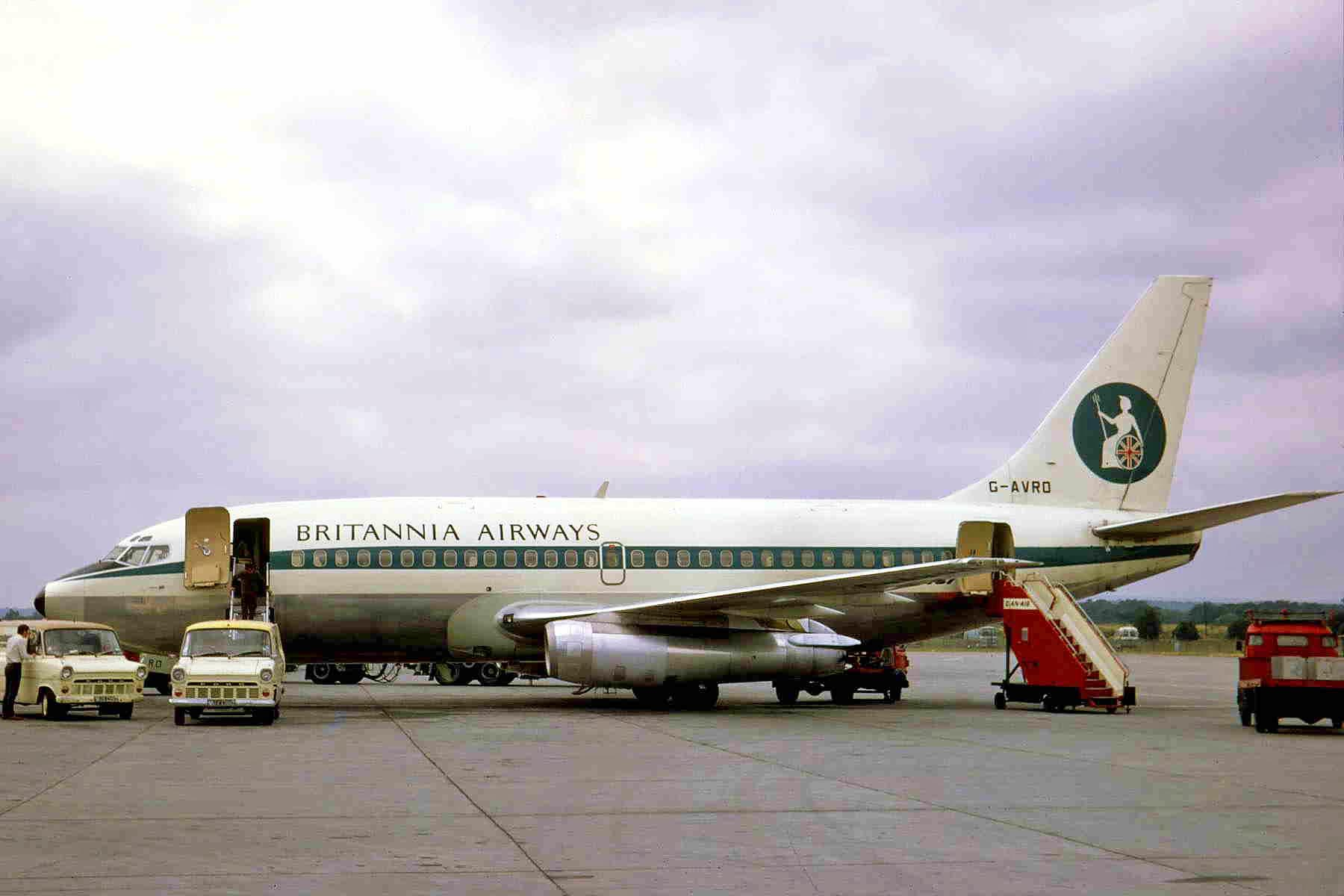
Boeing 737-200 at Gatwick Airport in 1969

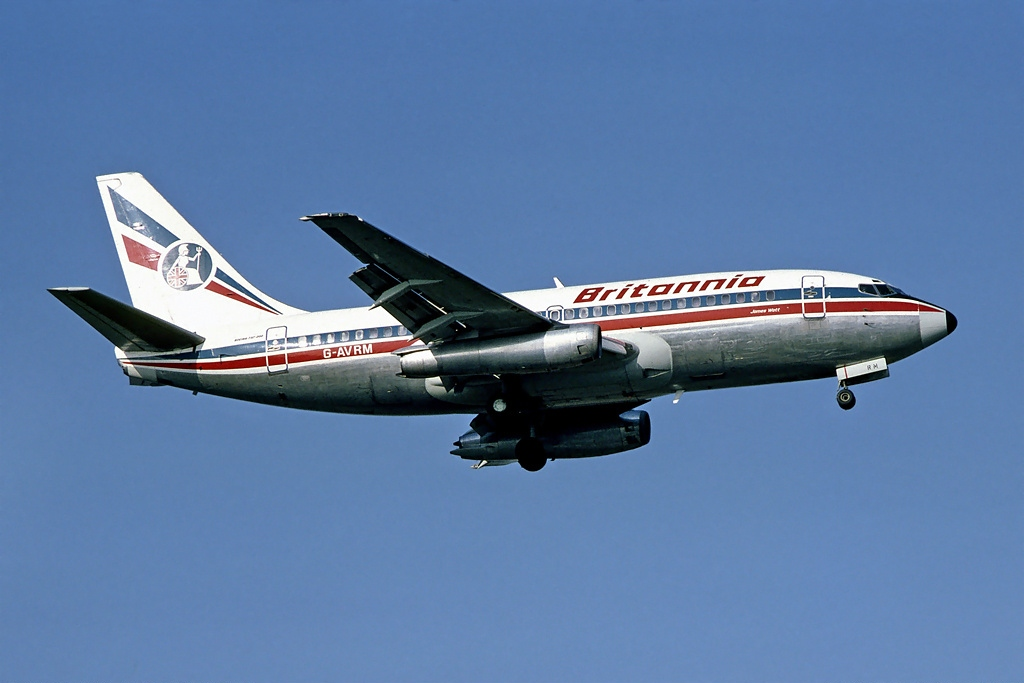
Boeing 737-200 in 1983

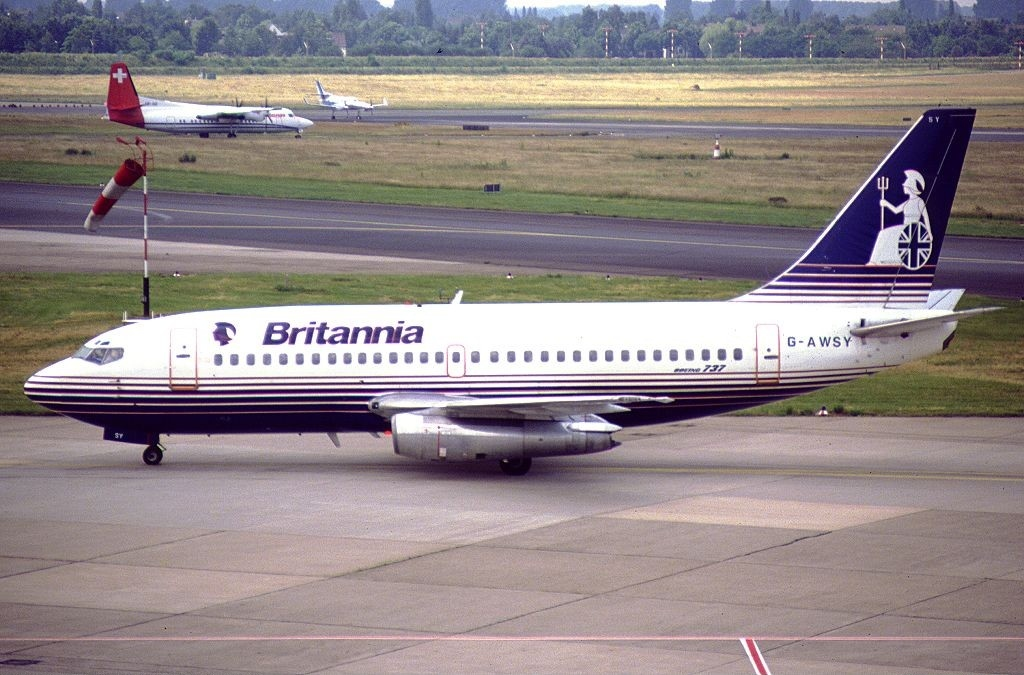
Boeing 737-200

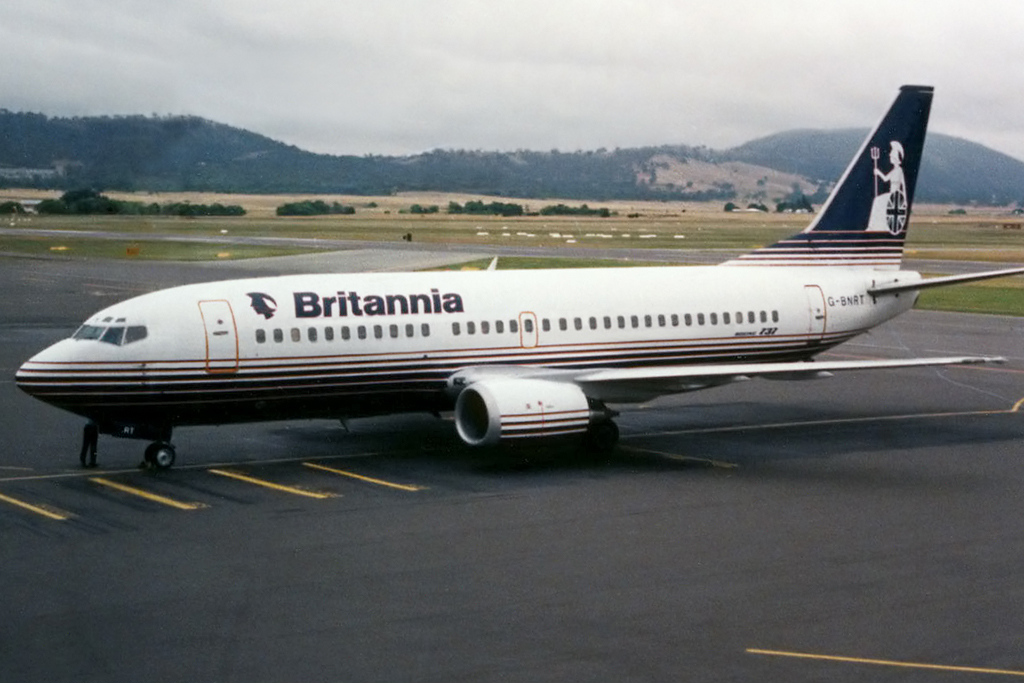
Boeing 737-3T5 in 1989

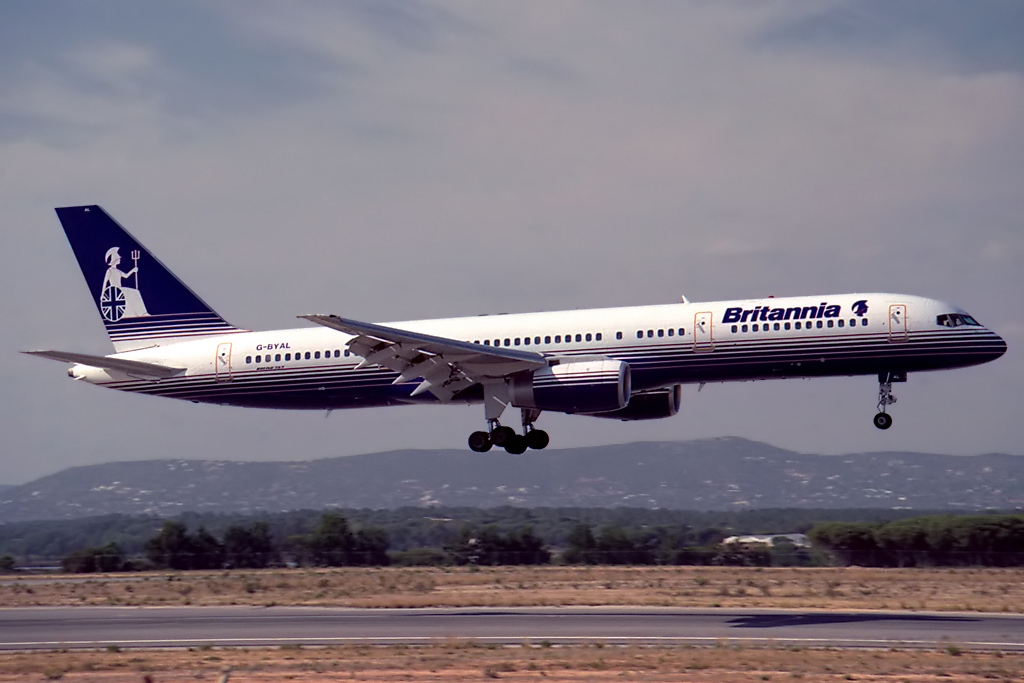
Boeing 757-200 in 1994

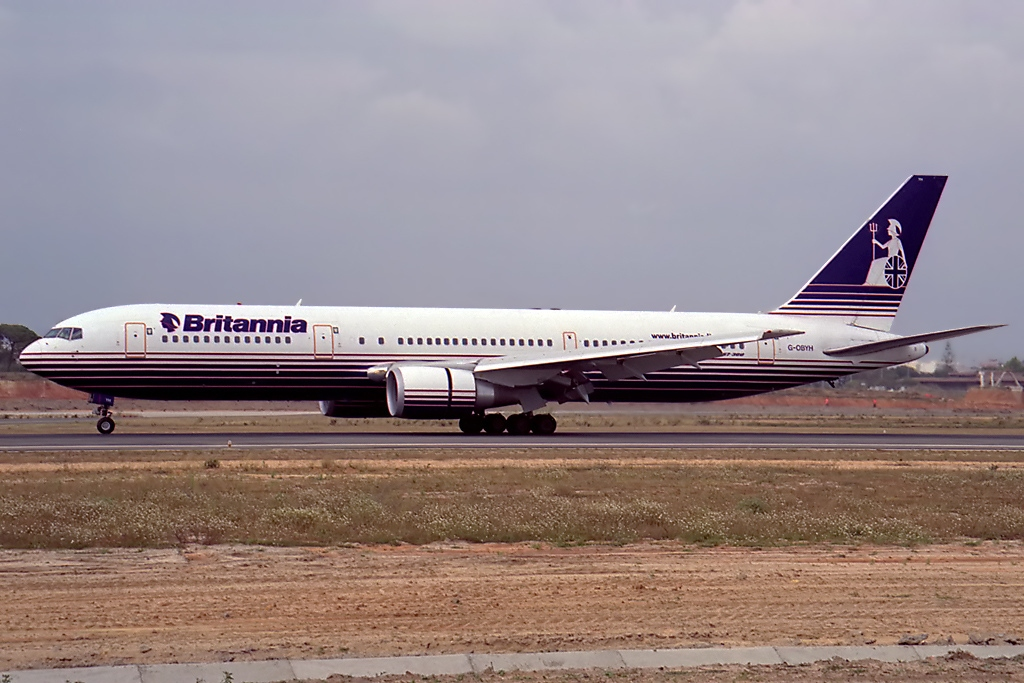
Boeing 767-300ER at Faro Airport in 2002

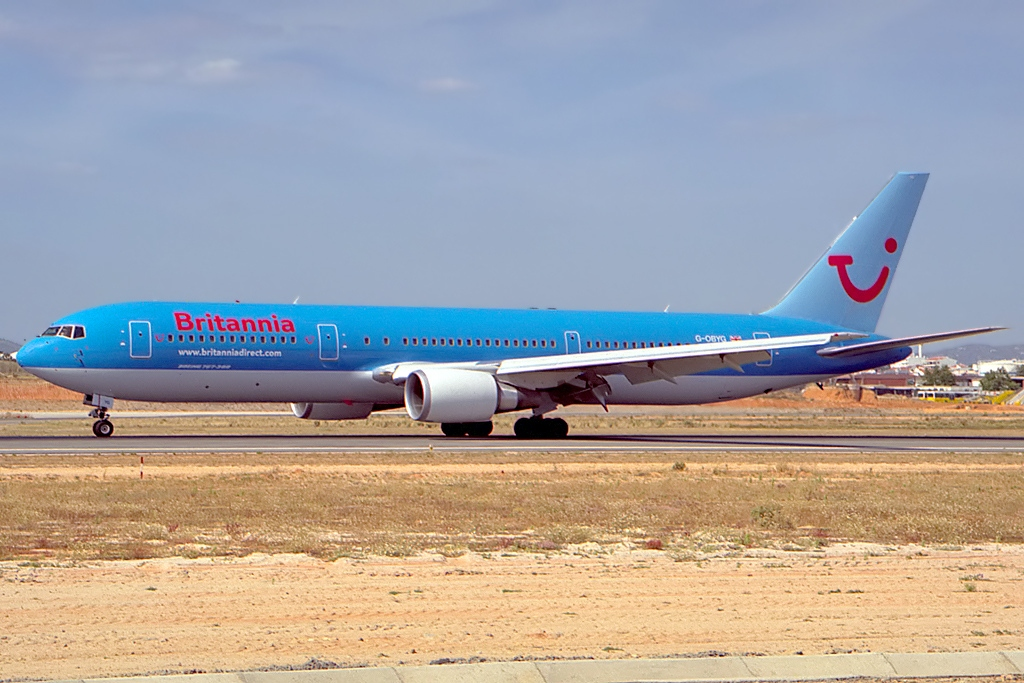
Boeing 767-300ER in final Britannia/TUI colours in 2002

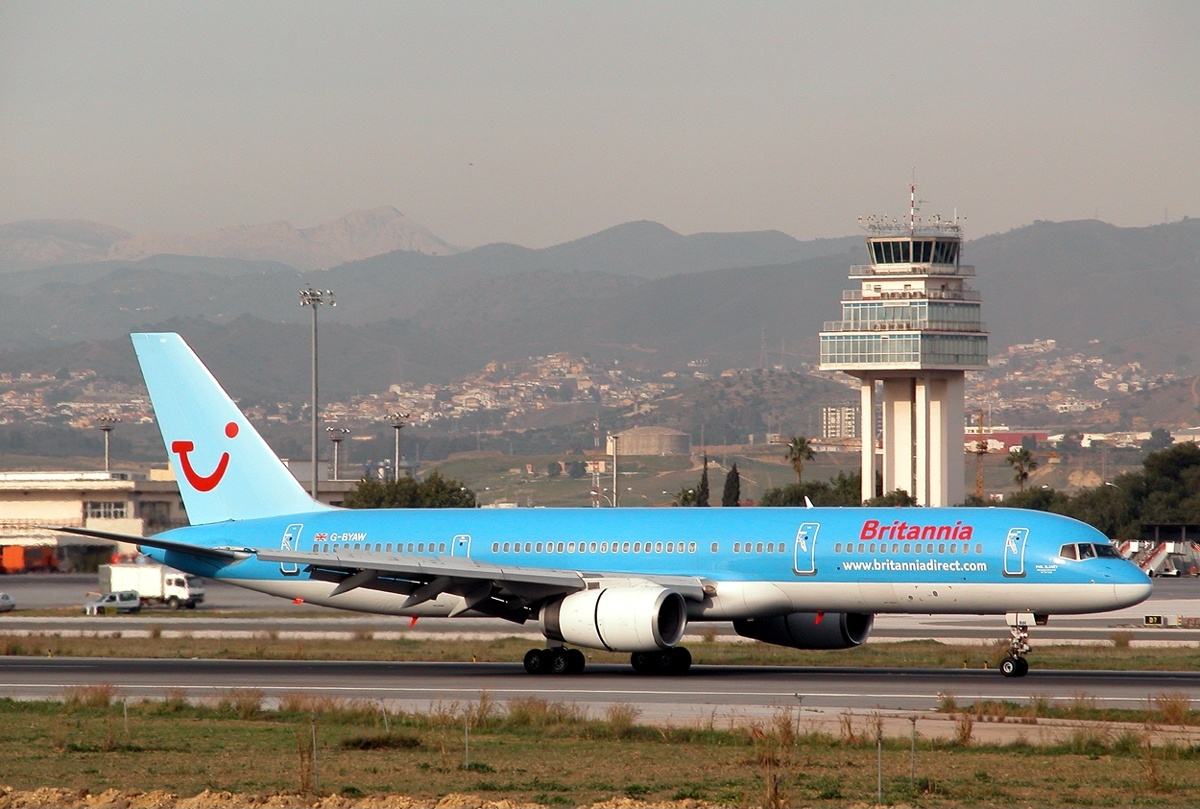
Boeing 757-200 in 2004, shortly before becoming Thomsonfly

== Incidents and accidents ==
Britannia Airways suffered two accidents whilst operating under that name (1961–2005):

1. On 1 September 1966, Britannia Airways Flight 105, a Bristol 175 Britannia, crashed into high ground on the approach to landing at Ljubljana, Slovenia due to pilot error after a flight from Luton, England. Of the 117 onboard 98 died.
2. On 14 September 1999, Britannia Airways Flight 226A, a Boeing 757-204, crashed on its second attempt at landing in heavy rain and poor weather conditions. Of the 236 passengers and 9 crew on board, two were seriously injured and 41 sustained minor injuries. One of the passengers who had apparently sustained only minor injuries died five days later of suspected internal injuries. The flight was an international charter between Cardiff, Wales and Girona Airport, Spain.

== See also ==
- Thomsonfly
- Thomson Airways
- TUI fly Nordic (formerly Britannia Airways AB)
- TUI Airlines
- List of defunct airlines of the United Kingdom
