= TUI Travel =

British leisure travel group

TUI Travel plc
- Type: Public
- Traded as: LSE: TT.
- Industry: Transport
- Founded: 2007
- Defunct: 2014 (Merged with TUI AG)
- Headquarters: Crawley, England, UK
- Key people: Friedrich Joussen (Chairman); Sir Michael Hodgkinson (Deputy Chairman); Peter Long (Chief Executive)
- Products: Passenger transport, travel agency, accommodation
- Revenue: £15,051 million (2013)
- Operating income: £297 million (2013)
- Net income: £63 million (2013)
- Owner: TUI AG (56.4%)
- Number of employees: 54,000 (2013)
- Subsidiaries: Thomson Airways; Thomson Holidays
- Website: www.tuitravelplc.com

TUI Travel PLC was a British leisure travel group headquartered in Crawley, West Sussex. The company was formed on 3 September 2007 by the merger of First Choice Holidays PLC and the Tourism Division of TUI AG, which owned 56.4% of it. The company operated in 180 countries and claimed 30 million customers.

The company was listed on the London Stock Exchange, and was a constituent of the FTSE 100 Index. TUI Travel merged with its German parent in 2014 to form the TUI Group.

== History ==
=== TUI AG ===
The company was founded in 1923 in Berlin, Germany as Preußische Bergwerks und Hütten-Aktiengesellschaft operating in the industrial sector. In 1959 it listed on the Frankfurt Stock Exchange and in 1964 was renamed Preussag. In 2000 it acquired Thomson Travel and in 2002 bought Hapag Lloyd, which itself owned the travel firm TUI (formerly Touristik Union International), and renamed itself TUI AG. In June 2014 TUI AG and TUI Travel announced the two companies would be merged.

=== First Choice ===
The company was founded in 1973 as Owners Abroad operating as a travel agent. It first listed on the London Stock Exchange in 1982. In 1987 it launched Air 2000 and in 1990 acquired Redwing.

=== Merger ===
In March 2007, the merger of the travel division of TUI AG with First Choice was announced. The European Commission approved the merger on 4 June 2007, on the condition that the merged company sell Budget Travel in Ireland. The merged company, TUI Travel PLC, began operations in September 2007.

TUI and First Choice's in-house airlines, Thomsonfly and First Choice Airways, were brought together under the former's Air operator's certificate in May 2008, and the merged airline was rebranded as Thomson Airways in November 2008.

In October 2011 it was announced that under a two-year rebranding programme, the store estate would be rebranded as "Thomson featuring First Choice" to create a single travel agency brand; the First Choice branding and uniform will be phased out, and the First Choice name will be used for all-inclusive package holidays sold by the combined network.

The company confirmed in January 2013 that it had received a proposal from its parent to merge. In May 2013, the chief executive of TUI AG ruled out a merger with TUI Travel. In an about-face in June 2014 the two companies announced they had agreed terms on a merger. The merger was completed and TUI Travel was de-listed from the London Stock Exchange on 17 December 2014.

=== Selloffvacations.com ===
The online travel retailer was sold along with Signature Vacations to Sunwing Travel Group in 2009.

== Operations ==
The Company was organised into three sectors:

- Mainstream
  - Central Europe
  - Northern Europe
  - Western Europe
- Specialist and Activity

== Airlines ==
In 2005 the names and liveries of the group airlines were changed to reflect the name of the group. The airlines were rebranded with the name best known in their local market or the name of the principal tour operator, Jet4you and Britannia Airways names were changed. Jet4you acquired the suffix "-fly" whereas Britannia Airways had a complete name change, to reflect the tour operator that it was flying for therefore Britannia Airways became Thomsonfly. Following the merger of First Choice Airways and Thomsonfly, the new combined airline became Thomson Airways. Both airlines had their aircraft repainted in the light blue TUI colours with a red TUI logo on the tail. However, Corsairfly has been renamed Corsair International and has a new livery.

=== Airlines before merger ===
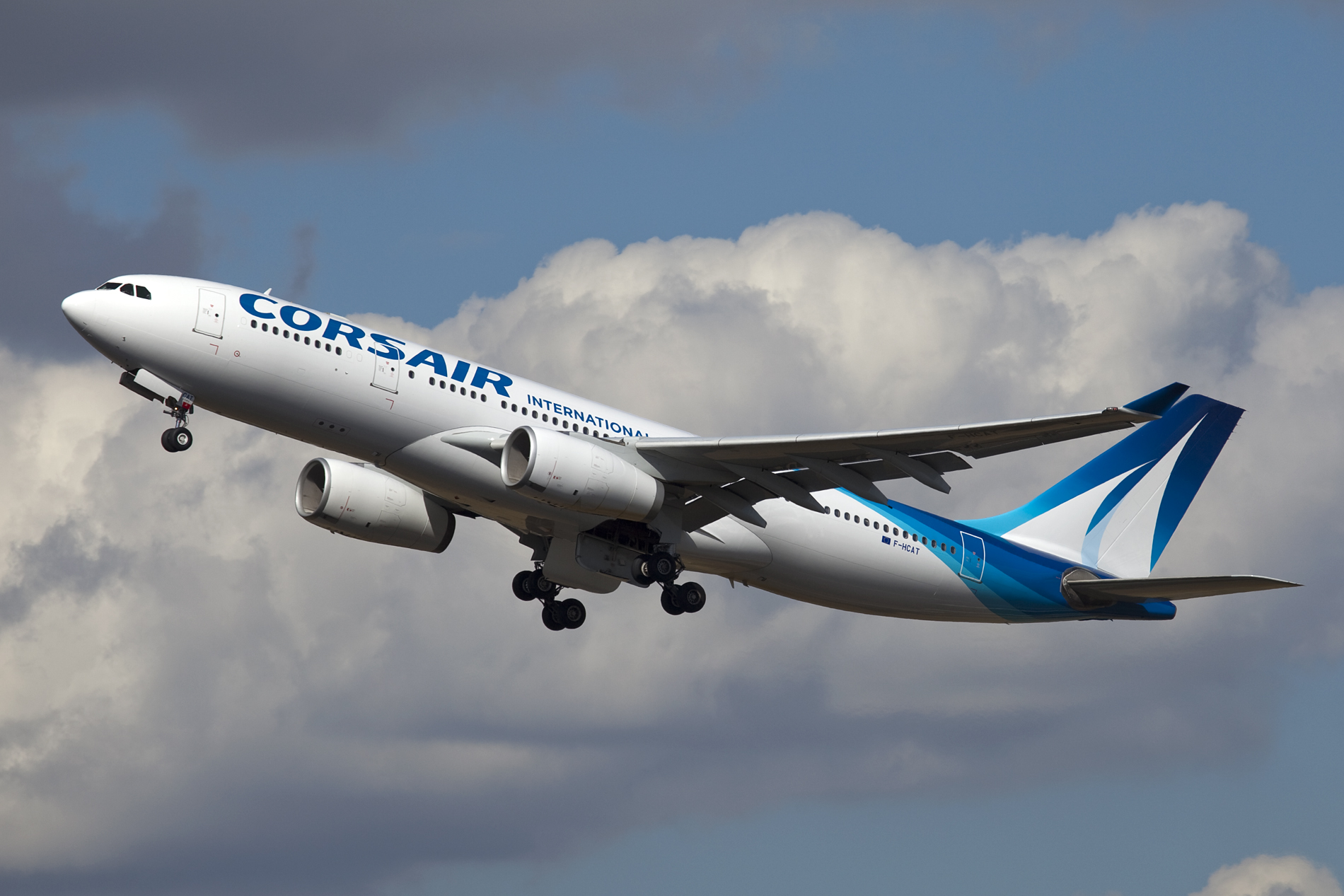
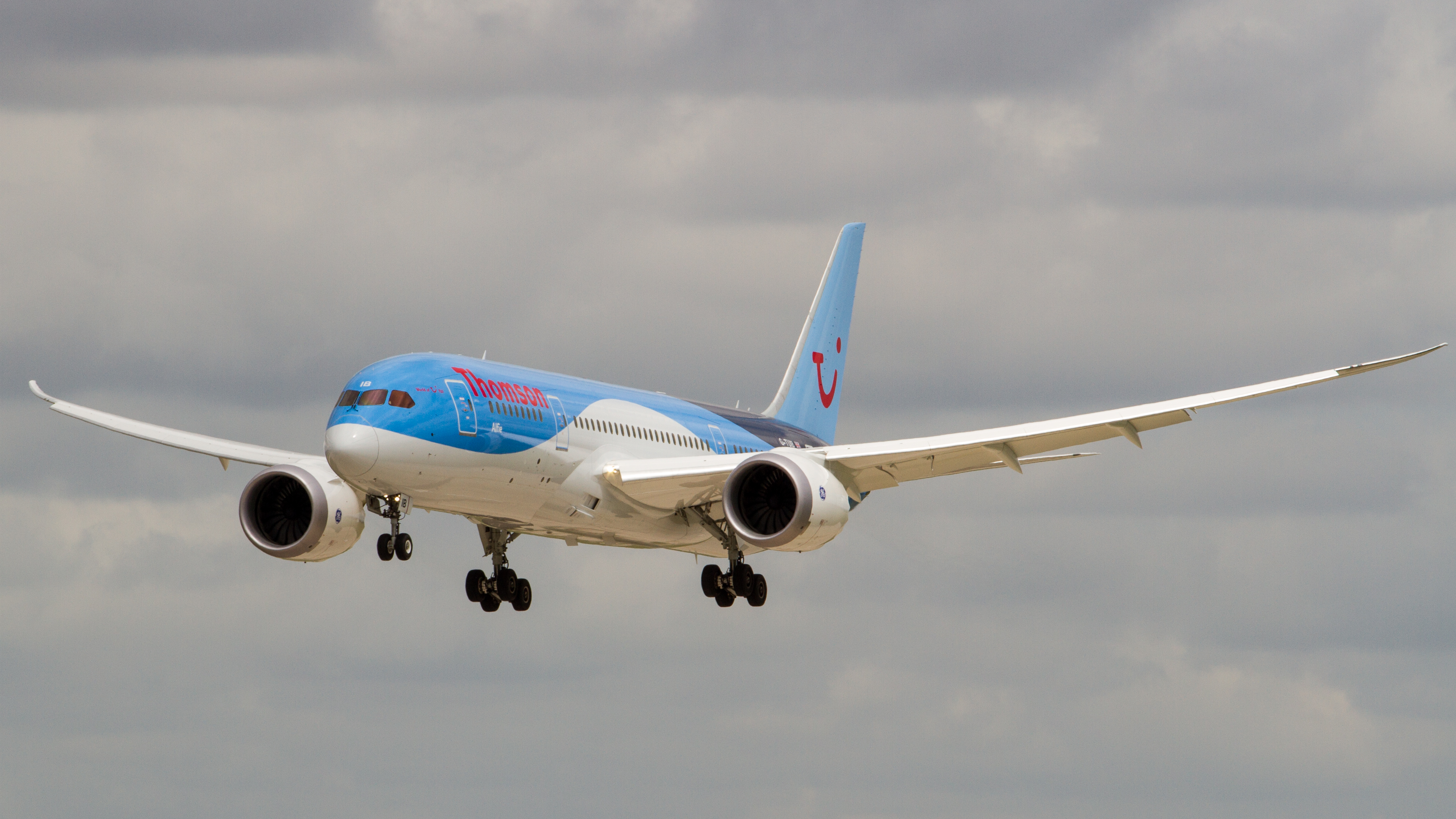
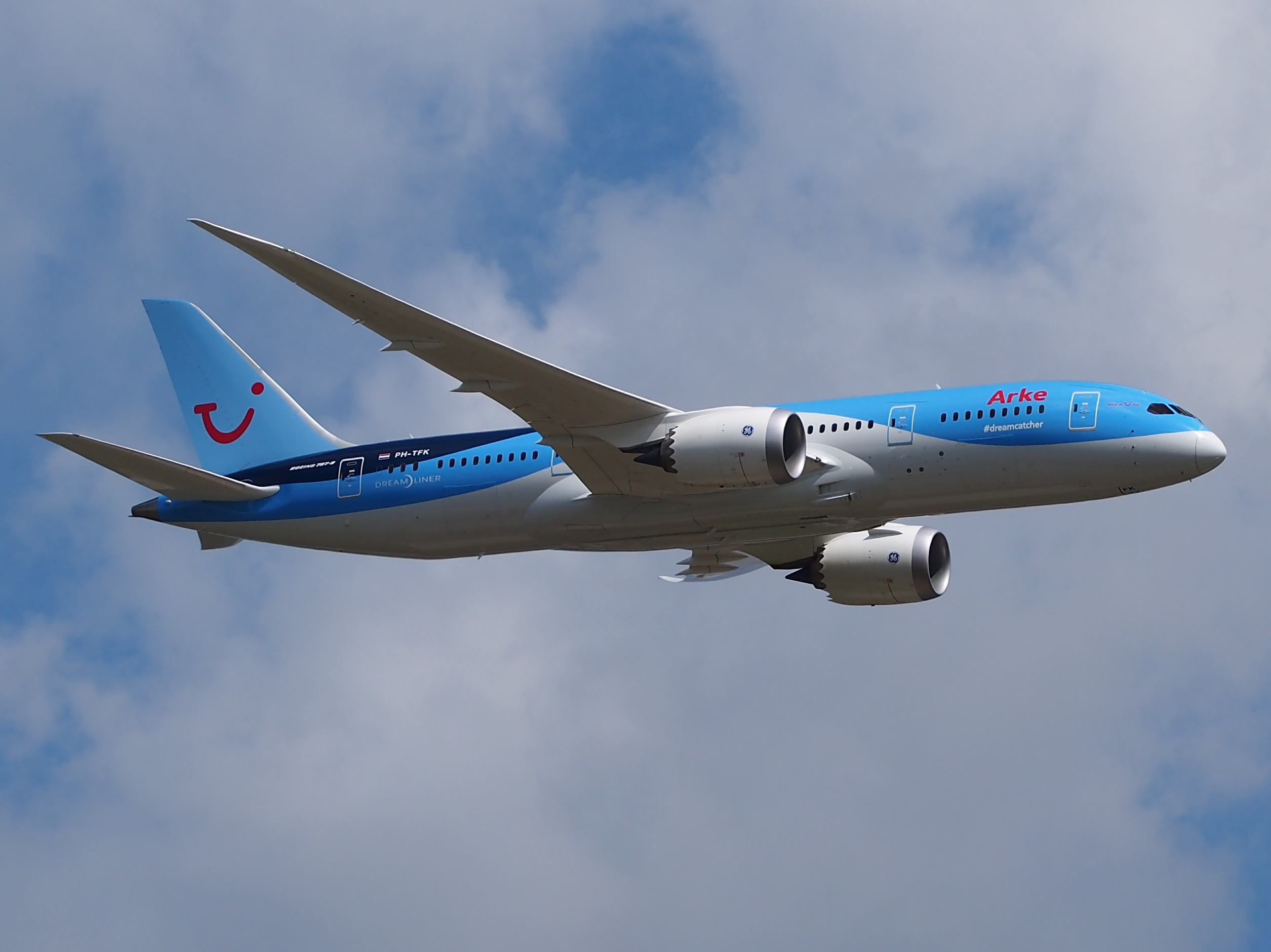
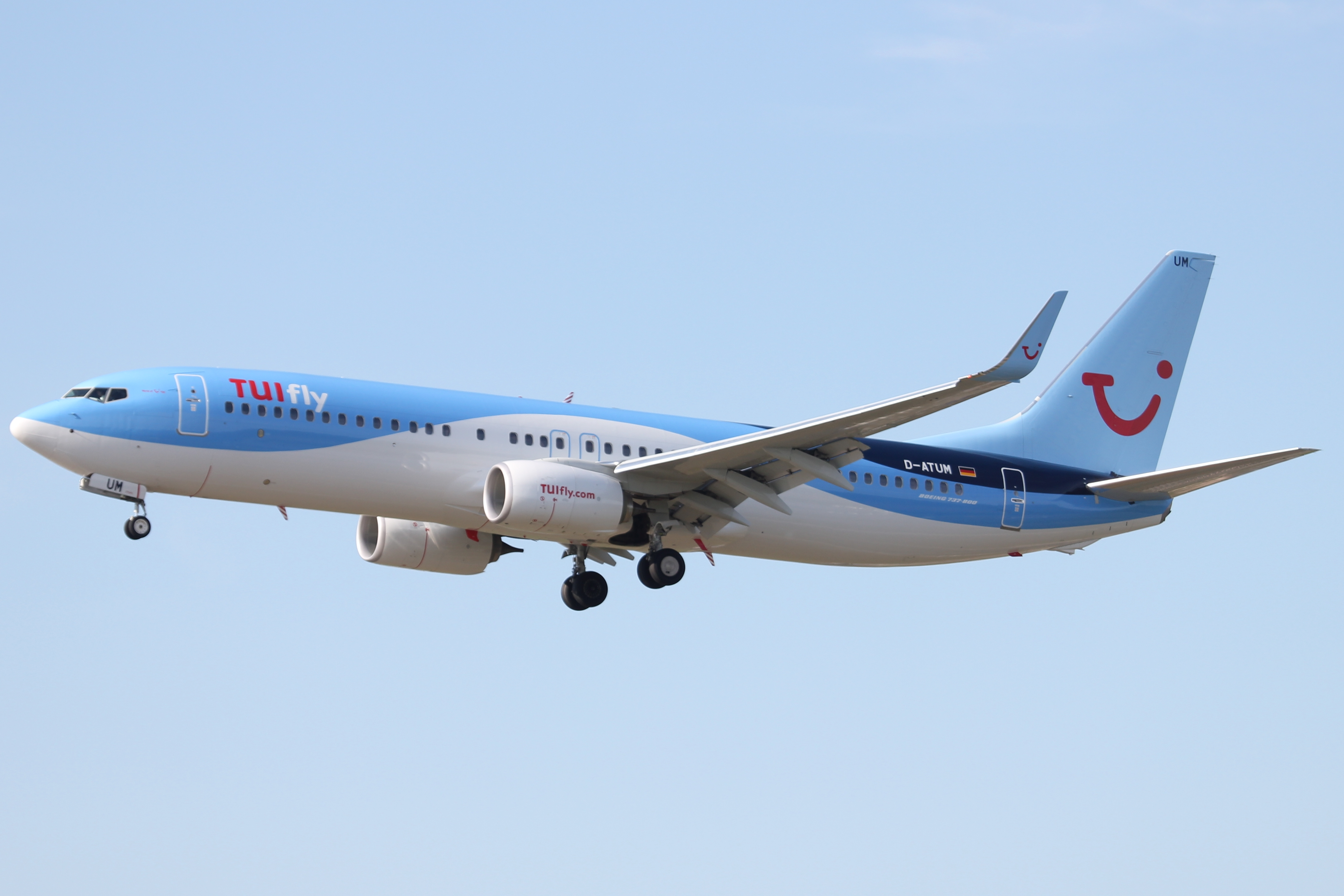
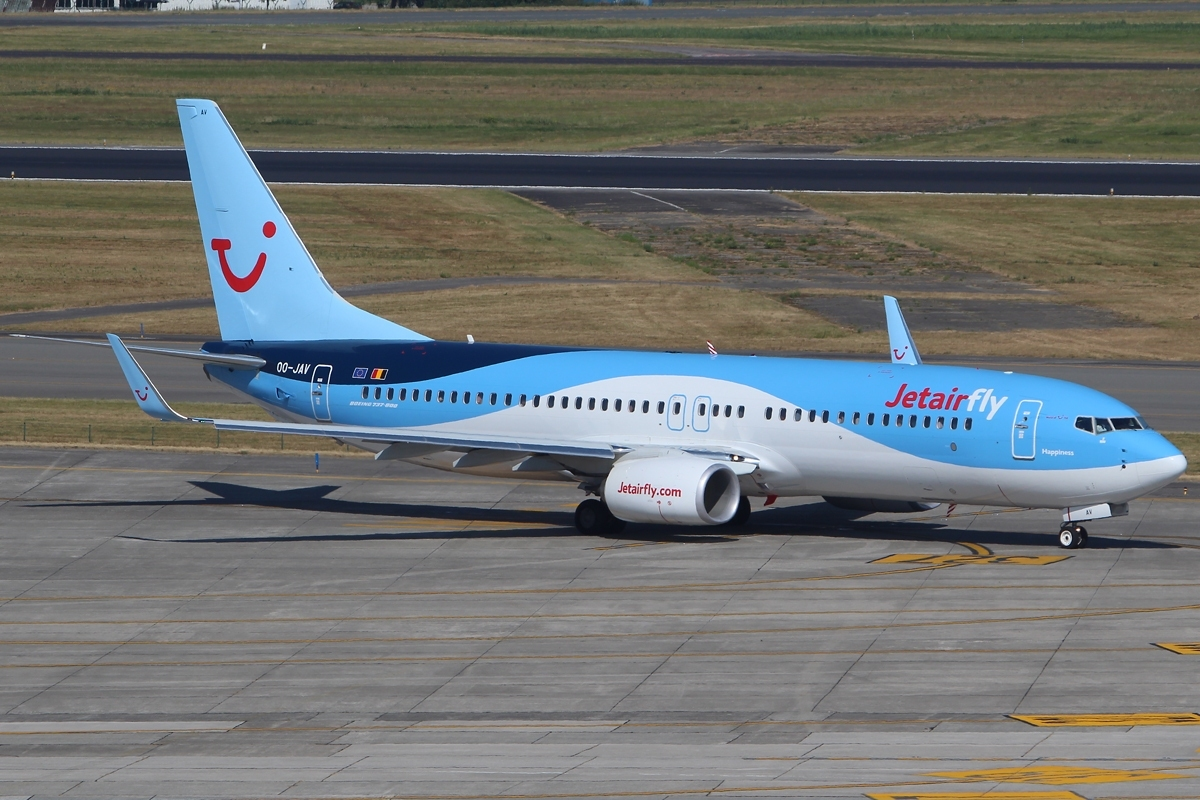
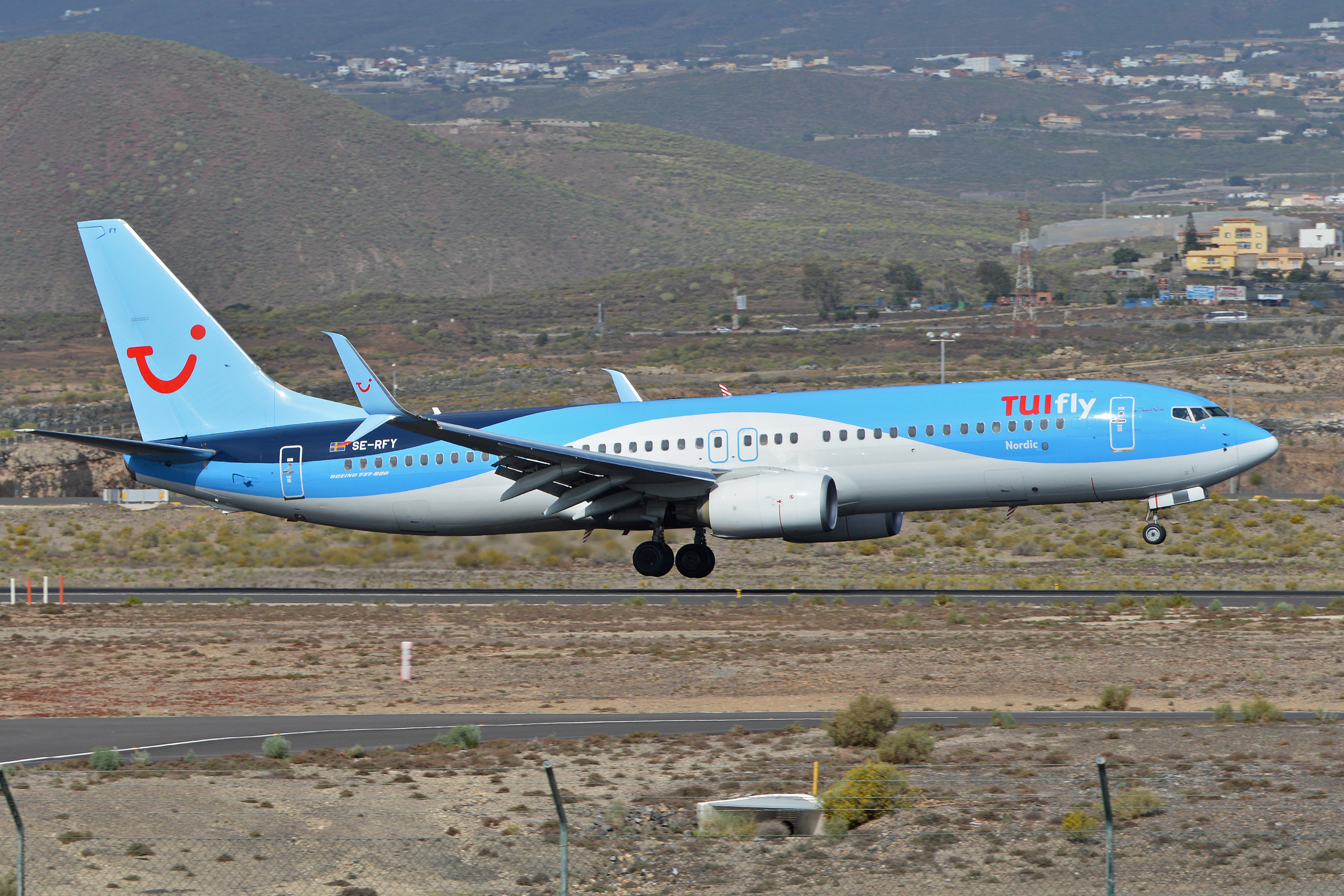
Airline	Country	Image	Description
Corsair International	France		Corsair International flies to 15 destinations in French overseas territories around the Mediterranean, Thailand, North Africa, and North America. This is the only airline in the TUI alliance that does not wear the TUI livery.
Thomson Airways (now TUI Airways)	United Kingdom (Republic of Ireland) Ireland		Thomson Airways is the largest TUI-owned airline and the largest charter airline in the world. It operates a fleet of 64 aircraft and flies from 26 British airports to 109 destinations worldwide. It was formed by the merger of Thomsonfly (formerly Britannia Airways) and First Choice Airways.
Arkefly (now TUI fly Netherlands)	Netherlands		Since 2005, the airline has operated charter flights from Amsterdam Schiphol to destinations in Southern Europe, North Africa, the Caribbean, and Latin America. It was formerly named Arkefly.
TUIfly (now TUI fly Deutschland)	Germany		TUI fly is a German leisure airline headquartered at Hannover Airport, and is the fourth largest airline in the country. It operates charter flights to Southern Europe, North Africa, the Canary Islands and the Middle East.
Jetairfly (now TUI fly Belgium)	Belgium		TUI fly Belgium, formerly Jetairfly, is a Belgian airline with its administrative headquarters in Ostend. TUI fly has operated since late 2005 and has a network of 180 routes to more than 100 airports in the Mediterranean, Red Sea, Caribbean, Canary Islands, Cape Verde Islands, Africa and the United States.
TUI fly Nordic	Sweden Denmark Norway Finland		TUI fly Nordic flies from Sweden, Denmark, Finland and Norway. They fly holidaymakers travelling with the tour operators Fritidsresor, Finnmatkat and Star Tour.

=== Former airlines ===
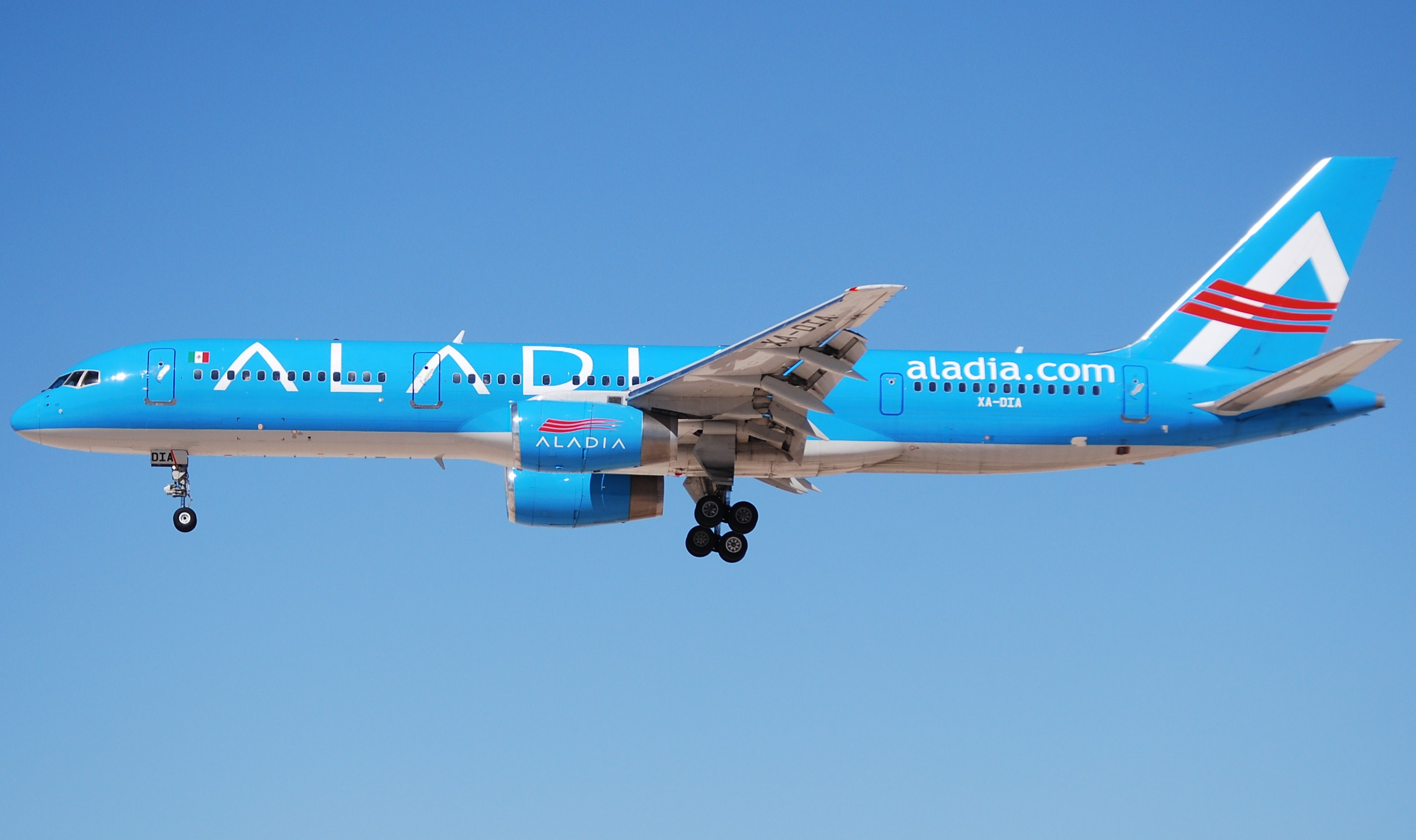
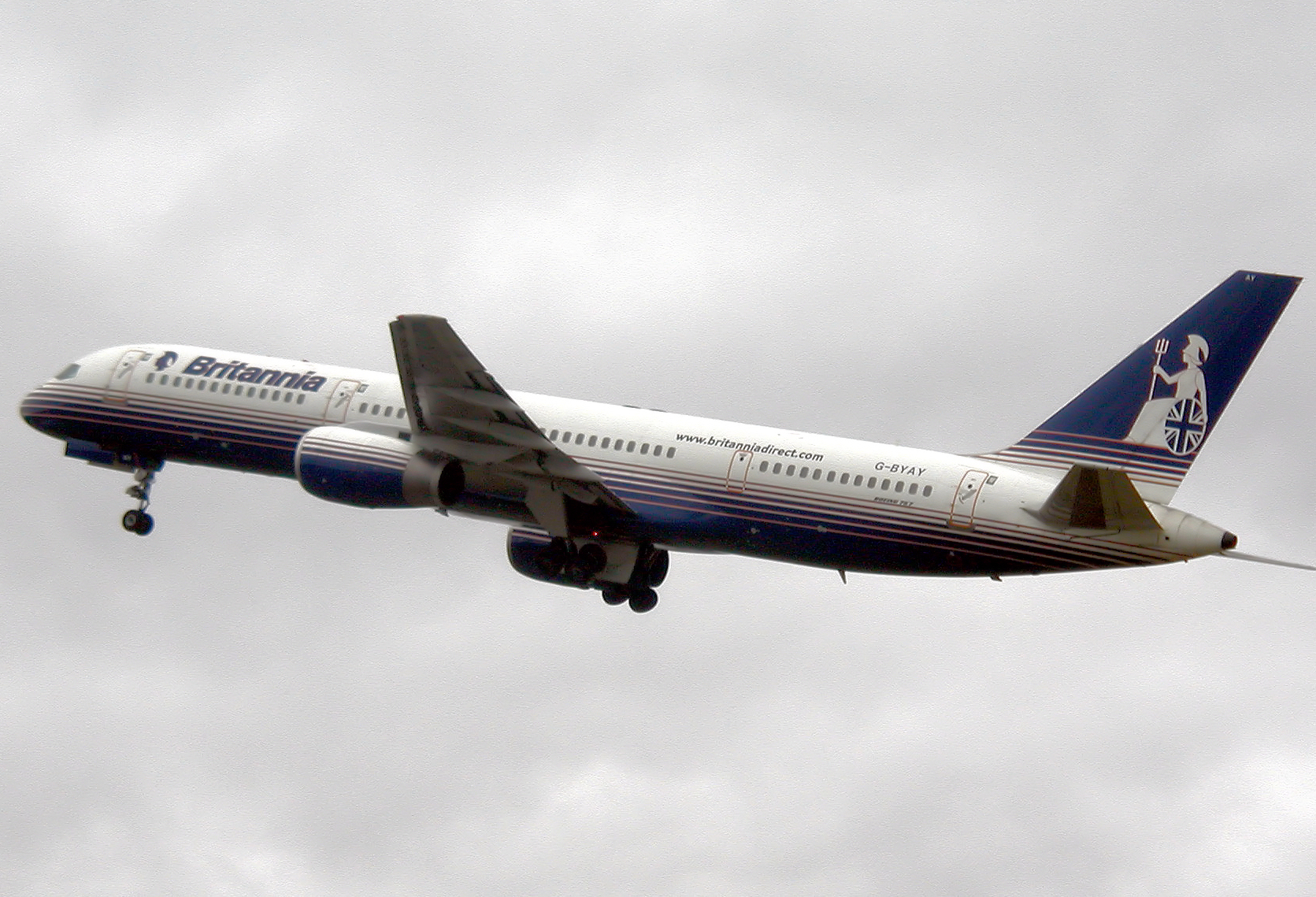
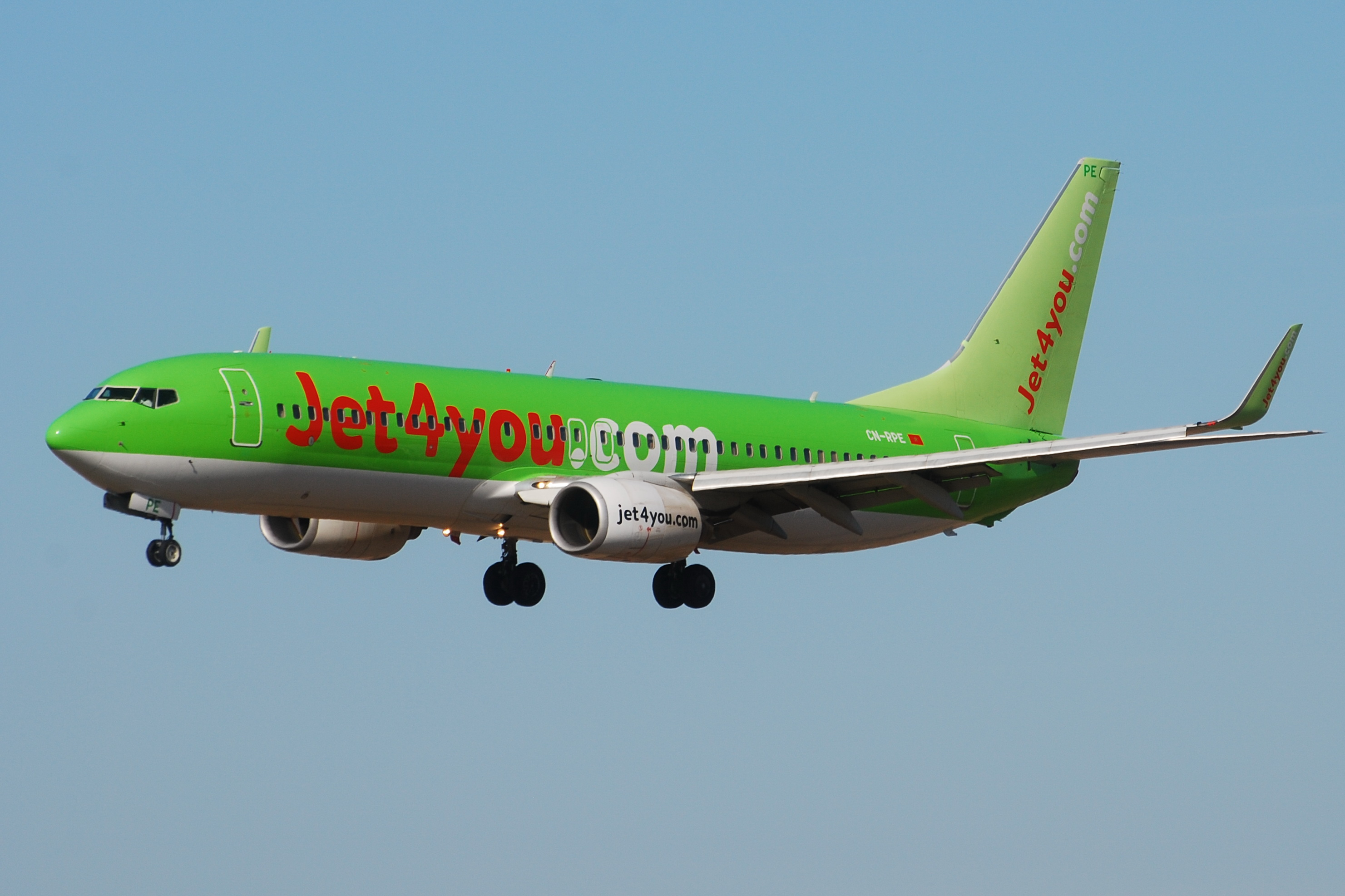
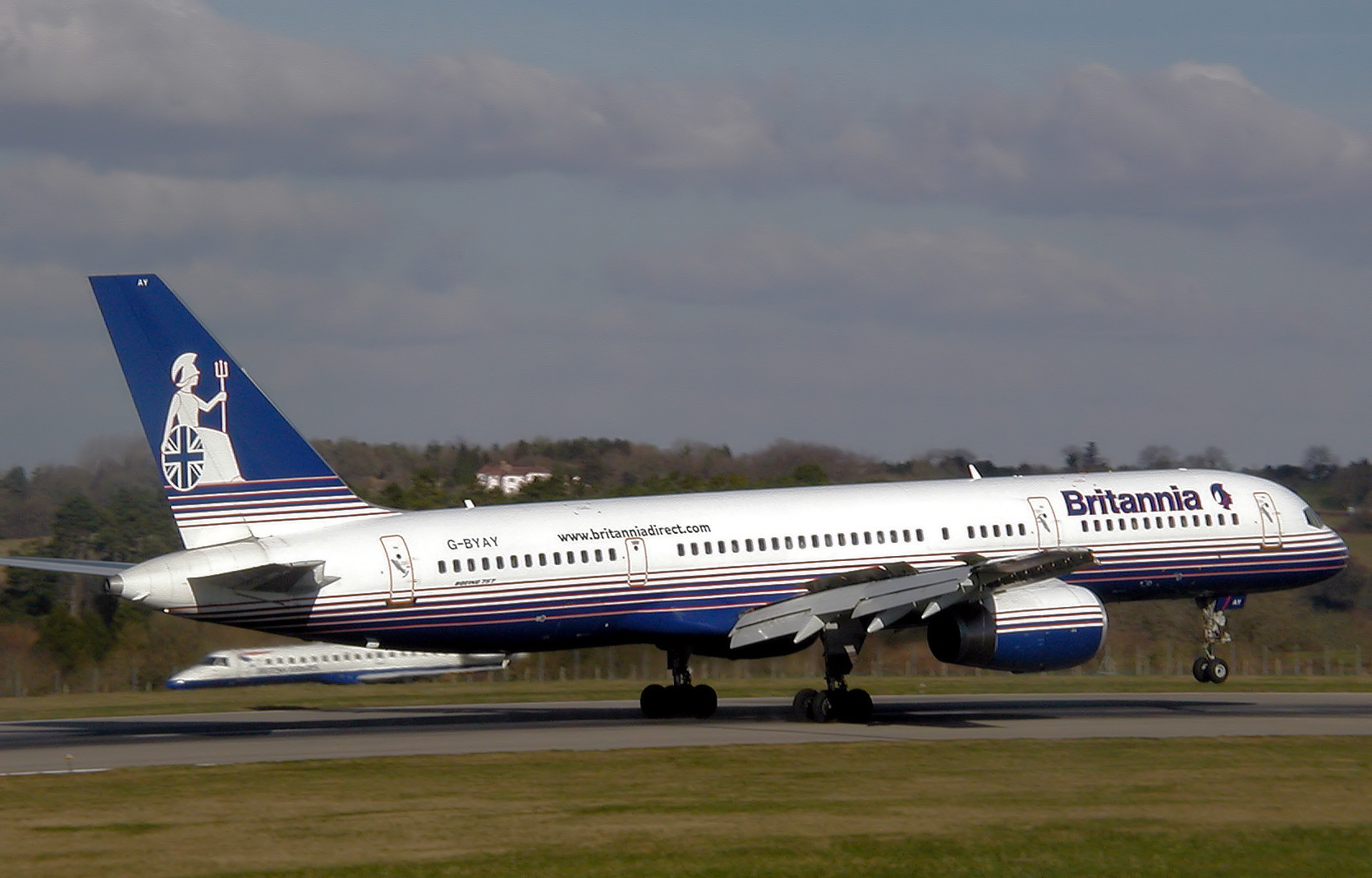
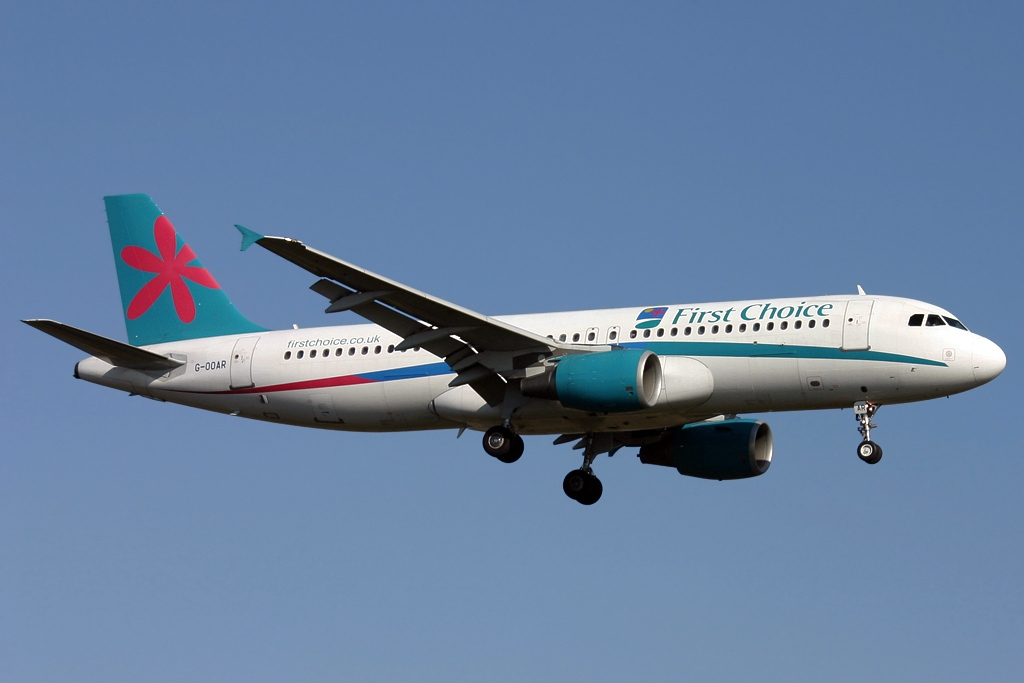
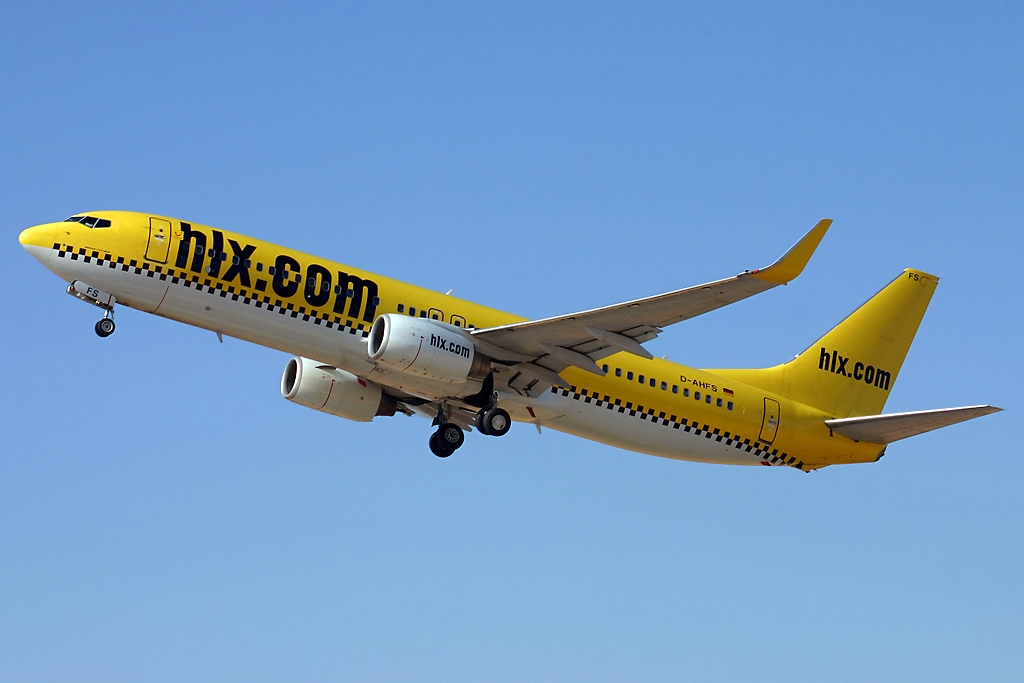
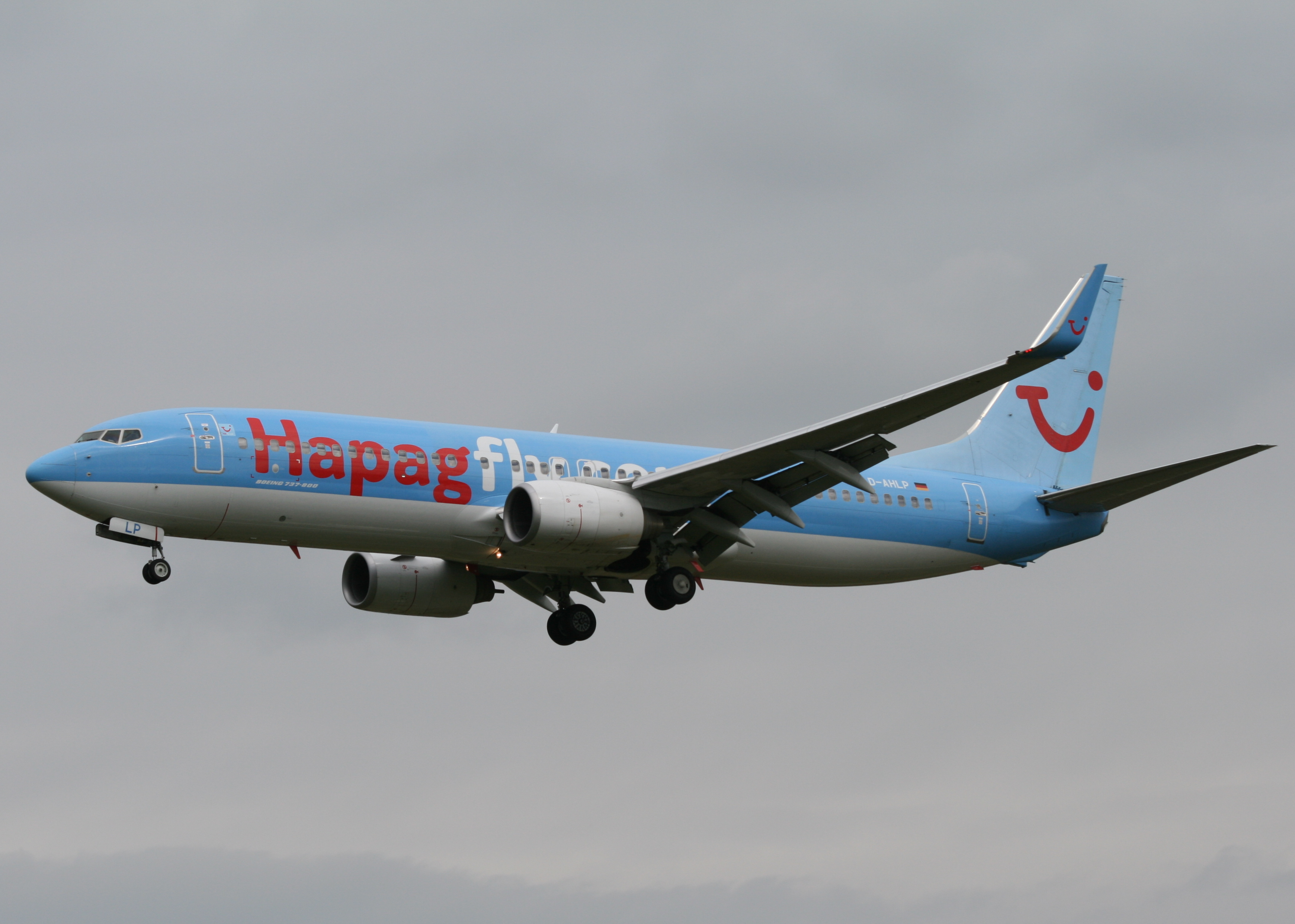
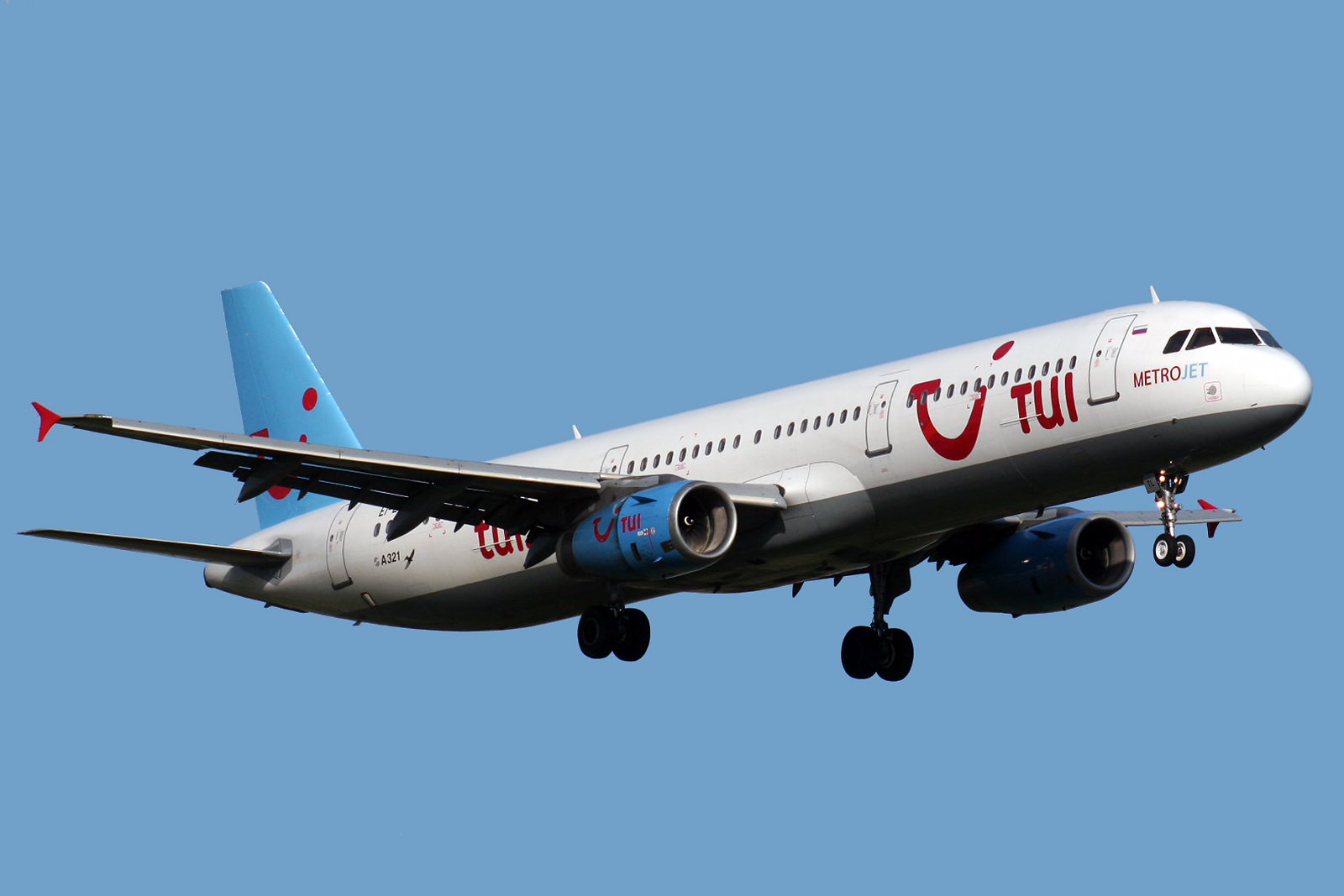
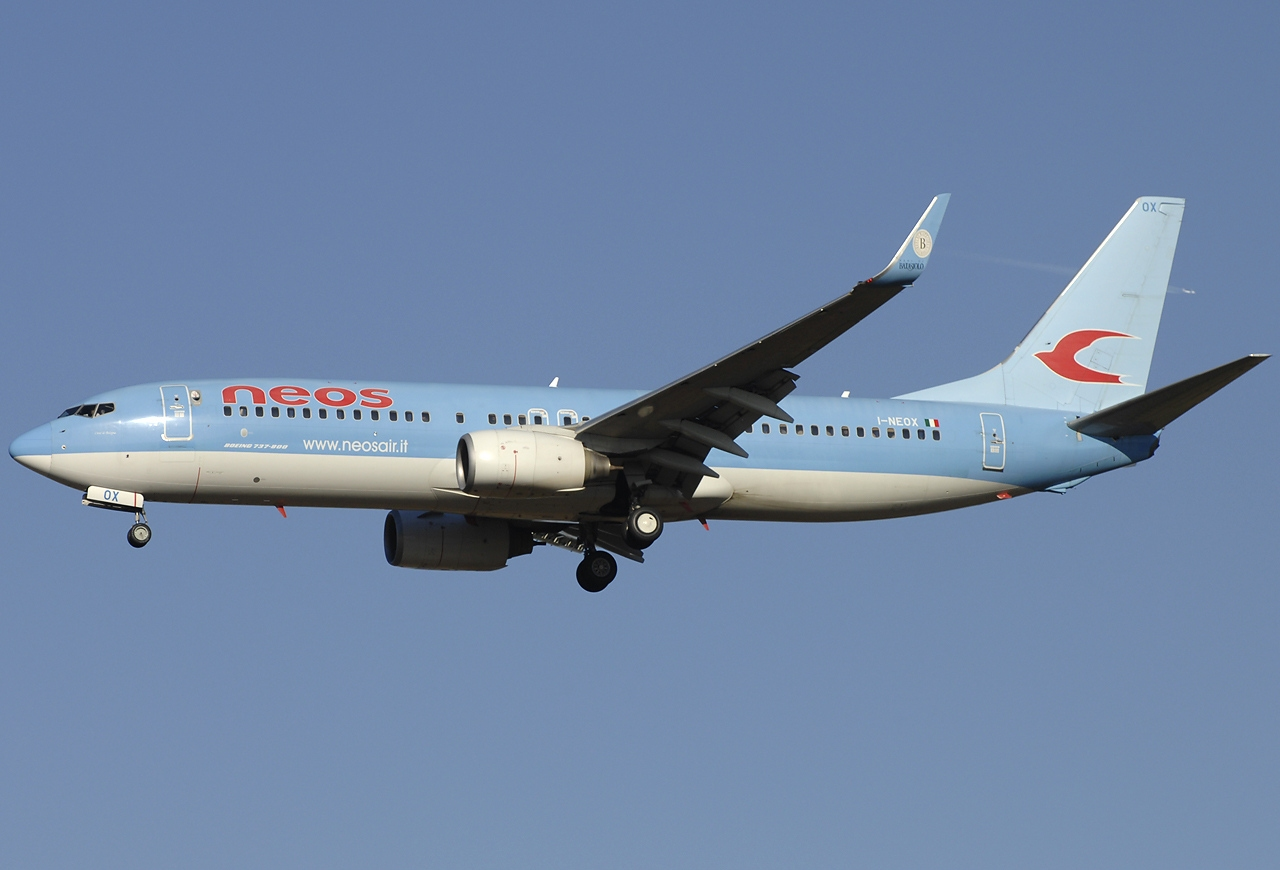
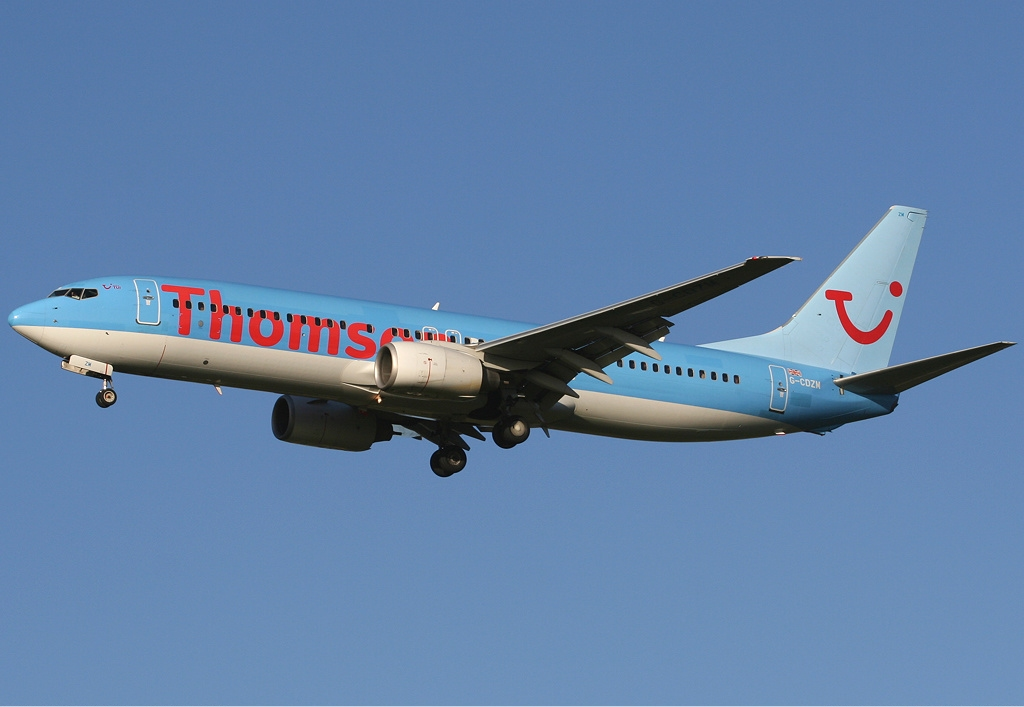
Airline	Country	Image	Description
Aladia Airlines	Mexico		Aladia was a joint-venture between the TUI Group and Mexican investors; launched in 2006. It was the only North American and Mexican airline part of the TUI Group. It suspended operations in October 2008 and has yet to resume its operations.
Britannia Airways	United Kingdom		Britannia Airways was the largest charter airline in the United Kingdom, rebranded as Thomsonfly in 2005. Its main bases were London Gatwick, London Luton, Birmingham, Manchester, Newcastle and Glasgow.
Jet4you	Morocco		Jet4you operated services between Moroccan cities and destinations in France, Belgium, Switzerland, Spain and Italy. Operations have now been merged with Jetairfly.
Britannia Nordic	Sweden Denmark Norway Finland		Britannia Nordic flew from Sweden, Denmark, Finland and Norway. It was merged into TUIfly Nordic.
First Choice Airways	United Kingdom		First Choice Airways was a charter airline of European tour operator TUI Travel PLC, based in Crawley, England. It flew to more than 60 destinations worldwide from 14 UK and Irish airports. Following TUI UK merging with First Choice Holidays in September 2007 it became part of TUI Travel PLC. The new holiday company continued with both in-house airlines (Thomsonfly and First Choice Airways) through Winter 07 and Summer 08 however from 1 November 2008 it became Thomson Airways.
Hapag-Lloyd Express	Germany		Hapag-Lloyd Express (previously also marketed as HLX.com) was a no-frills, high-frequency, express airline based in Langenhagen, Germany. It operated services within Germany and to destinations in Europe. In January 2007 in a restructuring, it combined its operations with Hapag-Lloyd Flug to become TUIfly.
Hapag-Lloyd Flug	Germany		Hapag-Lloyd Flug (between 2005 and 2007 it was also marketed as Hapagfly) was an airline based in Langenhagen, Lower Saxony, Germany. Merged with Hapag-Lloyd Express and became TUIfly
Metrojet	Russia		The airline formed in 1993 as a regional airline as Kolavia and rebranded to a charter airline with new name Metrojet. Was the only TUI Group operator in Eastern Europe and Asia till August 2014. In August 2014, the airline exited from TUI Group, because of negotiations between the airline and the group.
Neos	Italy		Neos was established on 22 June 2001 and started operations on 8 March 2002. It was started as a joint venture between Alpitour parent firm Finanziaria di Partecipazioni (IFIL), which is controlled by the Agnelli Group and the German tour operator, TUI. TUI sold its shares in 2004.
Thomsonfly	United Kingdom		Thomsonfly was a British airline, previously known as Britannia and a business within TUI UK prior to September 2007. Following TUI UK merging with First Choice Holidays in September 2007 it became part of TUI Travel PLC. The new holiday company continued with both in-house airlines (Thomsonfly and First Choice Airways) through Winter 07 and Summer 08 however from 1 November 2008 it became Thomson Airways.
