= First Choice Airways =

Charter airline of the United Kingdom (1987–2008)

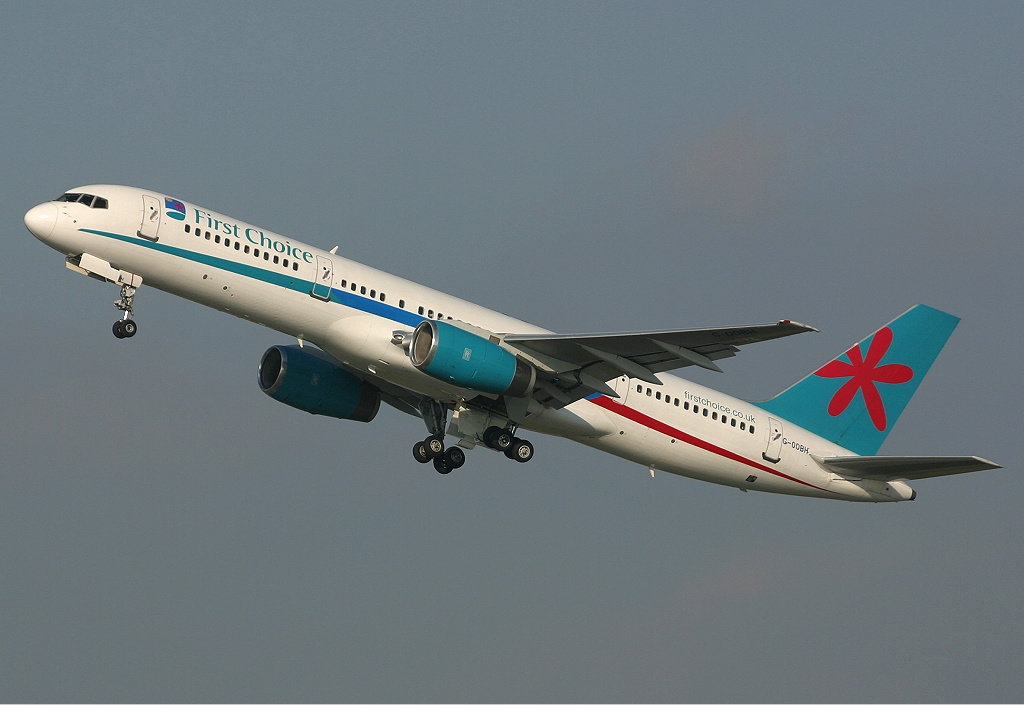
- Boeing 757 in 2005
| IATA | ICAO | Call sign |
|---|---|---|
| DP | AMM (1987–2004); FCA (2004–2008) | JETSET |
- Founded: 1986 (as Air 2000)
- Commenced operations: 11 April 1987 (as Air 2000); 28 March 2004 (as First Choice Airways)
- Ceased operations: 28 March 2004 (as Air 2000); 1 November 2008 (merged with Thomsonfly to form Thomson Airways)
- Hubs: Birmingham; London–Gatwick; Manchester
- Secondary hubs: Belfast–International; Bristol; Cardiff; Dublin; East Midlands; Exeter; Glasgow; London-Luton; London–Stansted
- Focus cities: Blackpool; Cork; Derry; Edinburgh; Humberside; Leeds/Bradford; Liverpool
- Parent company: First Choice Group plc
- Headquarters: Commonwealth House (Airline Operational HQ) Manchester Airport, UK; Jetset House (Group HQ) Gatwick Airport, Crawley, UK
- Key people: Christine Browne (managing director)
- Website: www.firstchoice.co.uk/flights

First Choice Airways Ltd. (previously Air 2000 Ltd.) was a British charter airline of European tour operator First Choice Group plc which from September 2007 became TUI Travel plc based in Crawley, England. The airline's operational and administrative functions were all based in offices at Manchester Airport. The airline launched in 1987 as Air 2000, rebranding as First Choice Airways in 2004 until its merger in 2008 with Thomsonfly to form Thomson Airways (today TUI Airways). It flew to more than 60 destinations worldwide from 14 UK and Irish airports. 70% of the airline's services were operated for its parent company, rising to 85% in the summer season, with the remainder on behalf of some 120 other tour operators. It also operated scheduled year-round leisure routes to Cyprus and the resorts of Spain and Portugal.

Its primary year round hubs were at London Gatwick Airport and Manchester Airport. The long haul services were sold only by internal companies such as First Choice Holidays, Eclipse Direct, Sunsail, Sovereign, Hayes and Jarvis and Unijet. In addition to these services the airline operated regular exclusive charter flights for Island Cruises a group joint venture with Royal Caribbean International.

The company held a United Kingdom Civil Aviation Authority Type A Operating Licence, permitting it to carry passengers, cargo and mail on aircraft with 20 or more seats.

== History ==
=== Air 2000 ===
Air 2000 logo

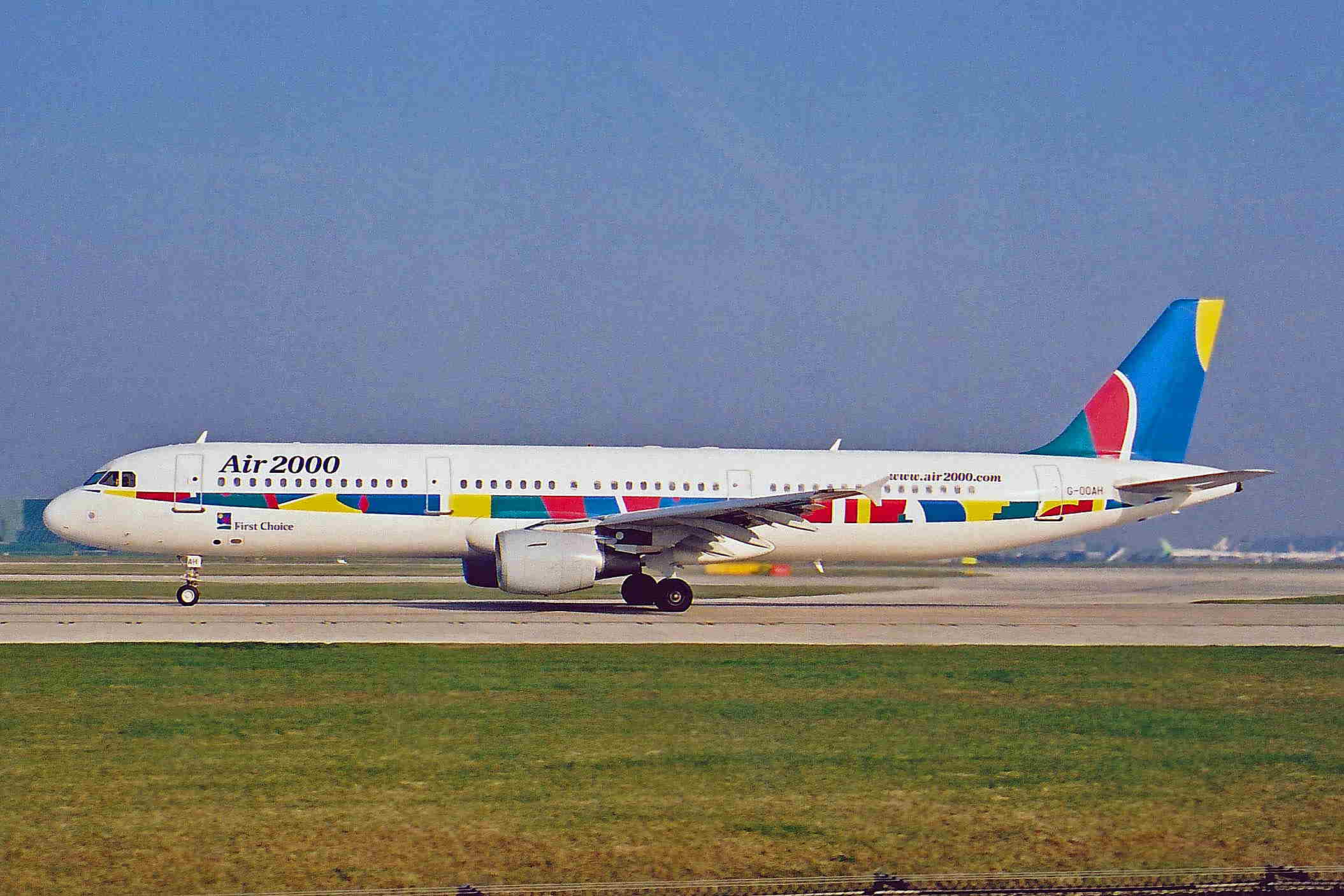
An Air 2000 Airbus A321-200 in 'Tapestry' livery taxiing at Manchester Airport in 2002

The airline was established in 1986 and started operations on 11 April 1987, launched by the Owners Abroad Group under the name Air 2000, with two Boeing 757-200s and a flight from Manchester to Málaga. The 757s were re-equipped for extended range and flights to the United States began in 1989. Their fleet doubled a year later, with one aircraft being based at Glasgow Airport. In the same year, the airline set up a subsidiary in Canada, to be called "Air 2000 Airline". This subsidiary lasted only a few days before the Canadian government suspended its licence. The second attempt was more successful and became Canada 3000.

Long haul services to Mombasa in Kenya were introduced during the 1988/89 season. The airline was granted a licence for scheduled operations by the CAA in 1992, which commenced in autumn 1993, initially between London-Gatwick and Paphos, Cyprus. Scheduled services were distinguished by the use of the 'DP' identifier with the flight number, while purely-charter flights used the 'AMM' identifier. Over the next few years scheduled routes to Cyprus from Birmingham, Glasgow, Manchester and Newcastle were introduced.

Expansion saw new bases outside the UK established, with Dublin becoming the airline's first overseas hub in 1996. In 1997, the airline signed a lease deal for two Boeing 767-300ER aircraft with GECAS, having also examined the option of introducing the larger A330-200, but opting instead for the 767. In 1998, Air 2000 parent company First Choice purchased rival tour operator Unijet for £110 million, with Unijet's in-house airline Leisure International Airways (LIA) being fully integrated in to Air 2000 in November. This included the entire fleet of aircraft and an order for two Airbus A330-200s. Before the merger, LIA had planned to replace its two 767s leased from ILFC with the newly ordered A330-200s, but in 1999 First Choice cancelled in favour of retaining the two Boeing 767-300ER alongside the two it had ordered from GECAS. In 2000, additional scheduled services were introduced from eight UK airports to six major Spanish and Portuguese holiday destinations. Air 2000 received a new more colorful livery which disappeared in October 2003 when the airline changed its name to First Choice Airways.

=== First Choice Airways ===
A First Choice Boeing 757-200 in 'Starfish' livery, 2009

The renamed airline carried 6.5 million passengers during 2002. In 2004 it announced plans to refurbish another six Boeing 767-300 aircraft to expand its long haul operations. The airline was the first in the UK to use the Boeing 777-style interior on their 767 fleet. The company had six aircraft flying long haul in 2007, in a two class layout, 195 Economy (branded Star Class) and 65 Premium (branded Star Class Premier). Following the 767 fleet refurbishment the airline's marketing campaign heavily advertised the claim that their economy seating on long-haul flights had more legroom than any other UK airline. All seats featured Panasonic seat back entertainment and mood lighting in Star Class Premier.

Star Class Premier was also available on select short and mid-haul services predominately departing from East Midlands Airport and London-Stansted. Each aircraft in their Airbus A321 fleet featured a small 3 row Premium cabin with upgrades sold as an additional extra to passengers travelling on this aircraft type as part of a First Choice holiday package. As part of the upgraded short-haul service; passengers were offered a dedicated check-in facility with enhanced luggage allowances, noise cancelling headphones (for shared IFE), complimentary upgraded meals, alcoholic and non alcoholic drinks with all seats in the cabin featuring additional legroom.

The 2005 total passenger traffic. was 6.0 million.

On 23 April 2007, First Choice confirmed it was to close its bases at London Luton Airport and Cardiff from next 1 November. However, due to the merger with Thomsonfly who also operated from these airports, the combined airline would keep them.

=== Thomson Airways ===
In September 2007, parent company First Choice Holidays and TUI merged to form the large travel organisation TUI Travel. As a result, the respective airlines First Choice Airways and Thomsonfly operated under a single AOC from 1 May 2008. On 1 November 2008, the new name Thomson Airways was adopted for flight operations. The combined fleet included 75 aircraft. There was however an order of 12 new Boeing 787 aircraft. From October 2017, Thomson Airways began operating as TUI Airways.

== In-flight services ==
First Choice Airways could include a three course meal pre-ordered for the flight; on First Choice-operated flights it was free of charge if the flight was a long haul flight, if the passengers had booked a Premier Holiday. In addition the airline offered drinks, snacks, and sandwiches for purchase as part of a buy on board programme.

== Corporate affairs ==
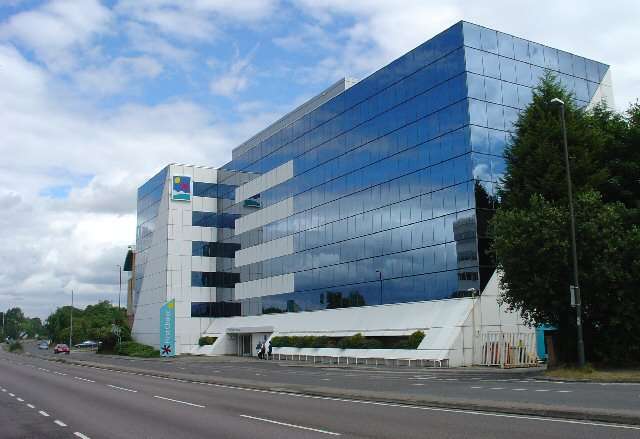
First Choice House in 2005

The group head office was located in the First Choice House in Crawley, West Sussex. When First Choice was an independent airline, 450 employees worked there. After the merger with Thomsonfly, TUI moved employees out. The final 70-80 employees were relocated to Jetset House the former Air 2000 offices at Gatwick Airport.

The airline's operational HQ was based Commonwealth House at Manchester Airport where the airline occupied the 3rd and 4th floors of the building. This office providing all non-corporate functions such as airline ops, cargo, crewing, customer support, flight planning, preflight services, safety and training for all bases. Although the office was partially retained for Manchester base functions for the new airline; almost all operational functions transferred to Thomsonfly in Luton under the new combined AOC from 1 May 2008.

== Fleet ==
=== Final fleet ===
The First Choice fleet included the following aircraft (at May 2008):

Air 2000 and First Choice Airways fleet
| Aircraft | In service | Orders | Passengers | Notes |
|---|---|---|---|---|
| Airbus A320-200 | 7 | — | 180 | Few wet lease to Skyservice Airlines for winter season |
| Airbus A321-200 | 6 | — | 218 | |
| Boeing 757-200 | 20 | — | 233 | Few wet lease to Skyservice Airlines for winter season |
| Boeing 767-300ER | 8 | — | 258 | 2x ex Leisure International Airways |
| Boeing 787-8 | — | 12 | TBA | Orders transferred to Thomson Airways. |
| Total | 41 | 12 | | |

=== Aircraft orders ===
The airline would have been the UK launch customer for the Boeing 787 Dreamliner, having placed a firm order for six aircraft in February 2005, with an option for a further six. In December 2006, the airline announced the purchase of a further two 787 Dreamliners, taking its order to eight aircraft. In March 2007 First Choice Airways announced it was converting all four remaining options to orders, bringing the total to 12 aircraft.

Although planned to enter service in summer 2009, delays to the Boeing 787 programme meant that First Choice Airways would not have been able to introduce the aircraft to the fleet until 2011. Each Boeing 787-8 would have replaced a Boeing 767-300 on long haul routes as they were delivered. The deliveries were expected to take around two years, with six aircraft expected to be based at Manchester Airport and the remainder based at London Gatwick Airport.

The 2008 merger with Thomsonfly meant the newly formed airline, Thomson Airways, inherited the orders and was the UK launch customer. Following the delays in Boeing's development programme, the airline began flights with its first 787 in June 2013

== Gallery ==
Air 2000 first livery

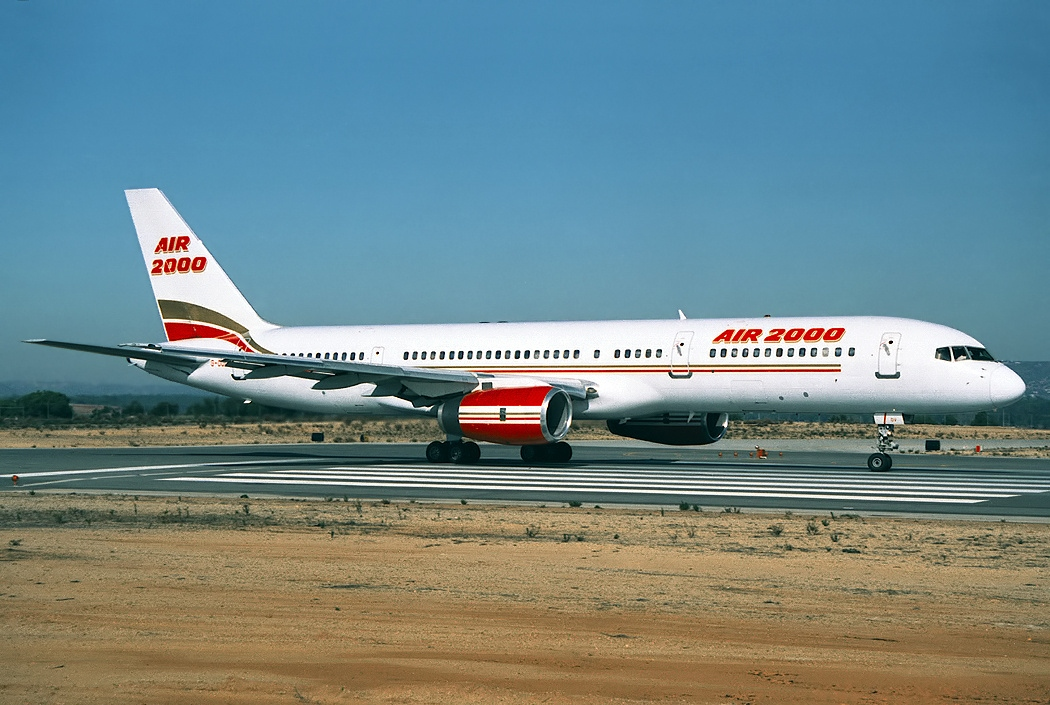
Boeing 757-225

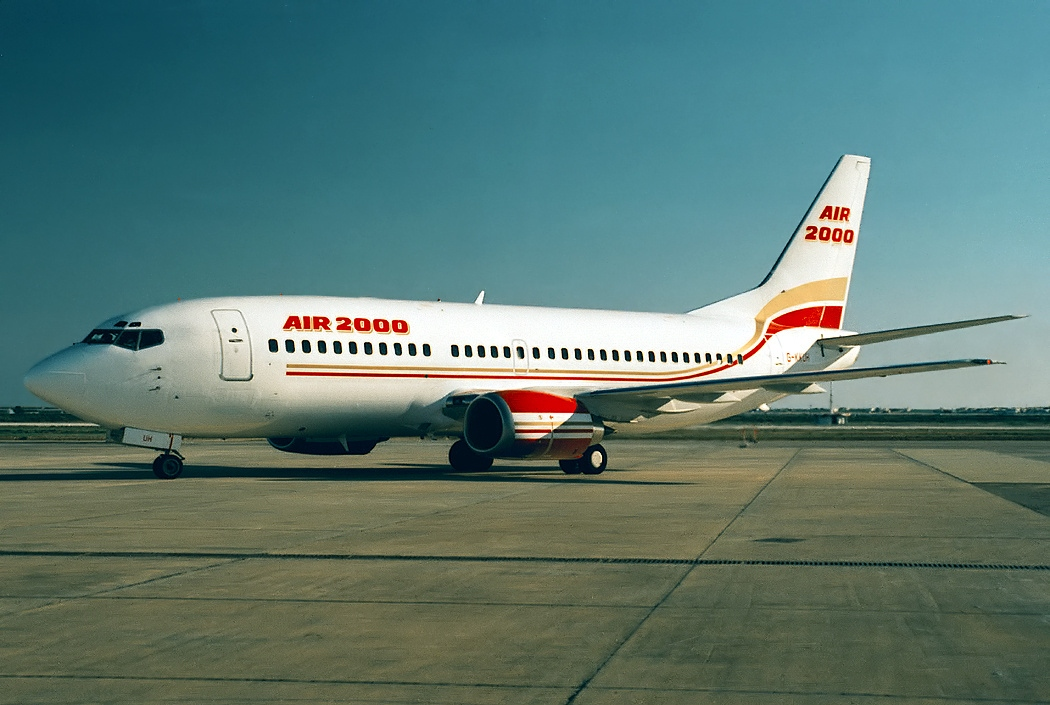
Boeing 737-3Q8

Air 2000 second livery

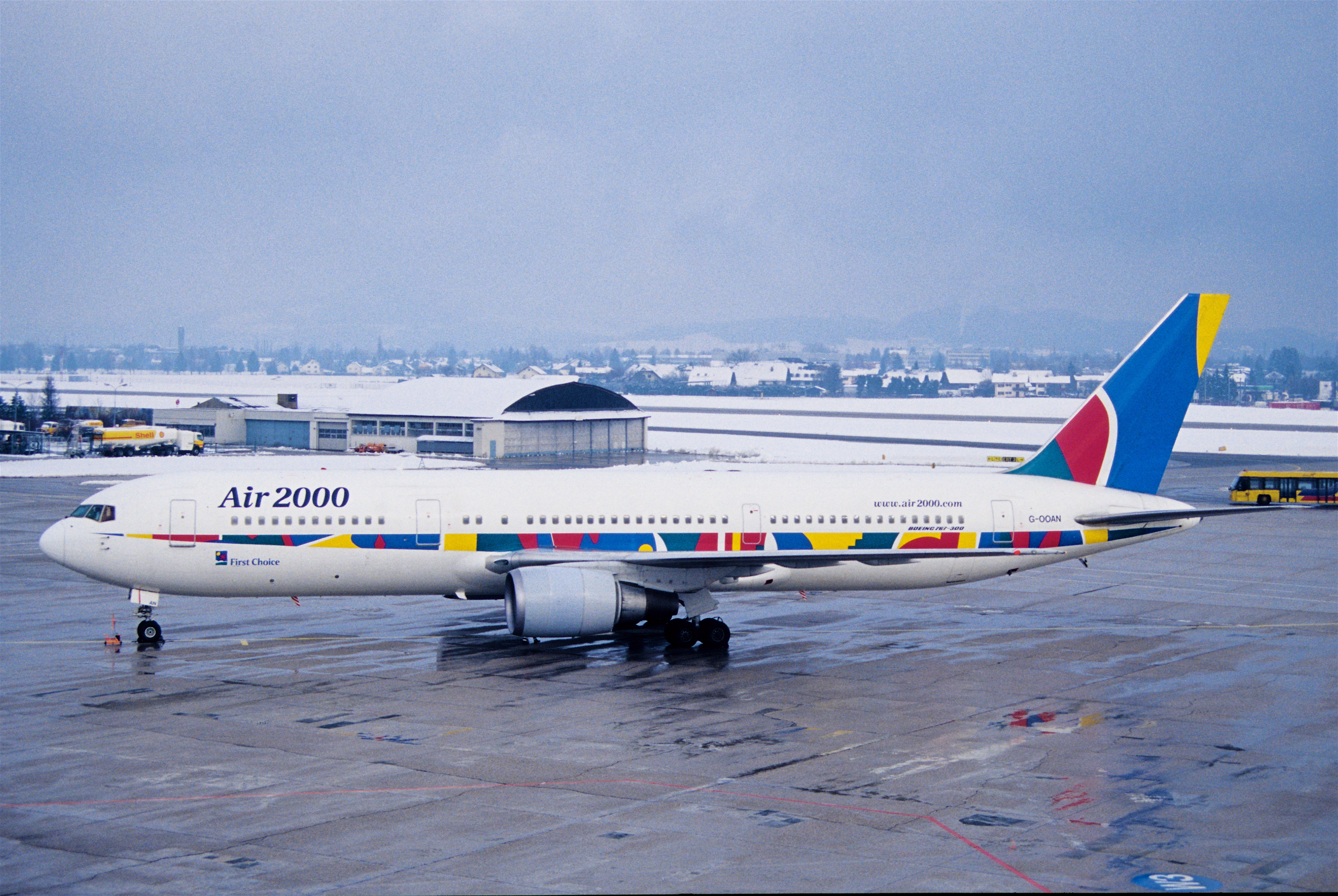
Boeing 767-300

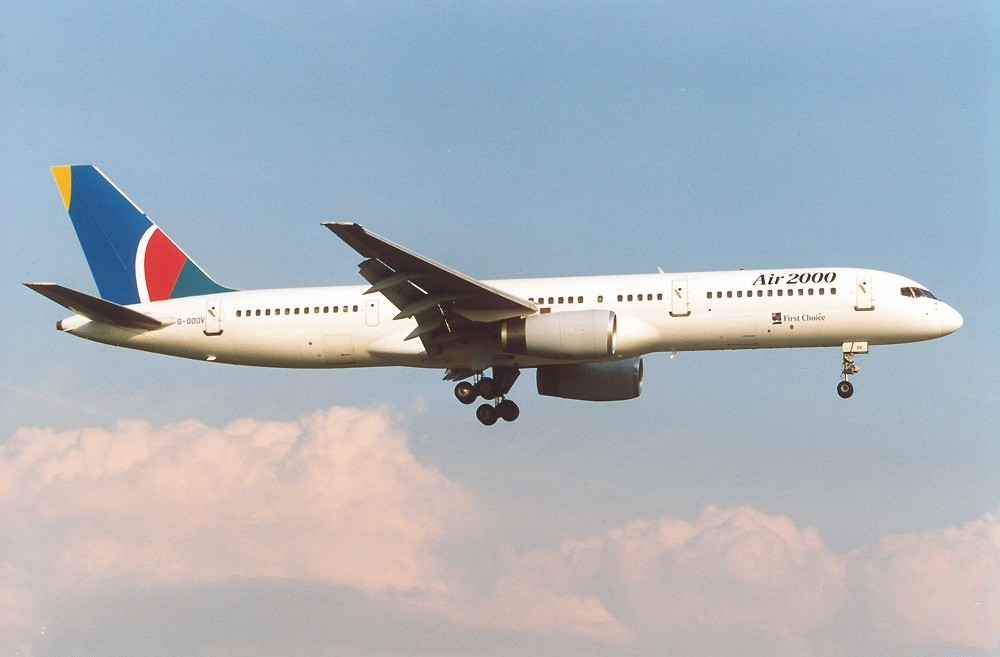
Boeing 757-225

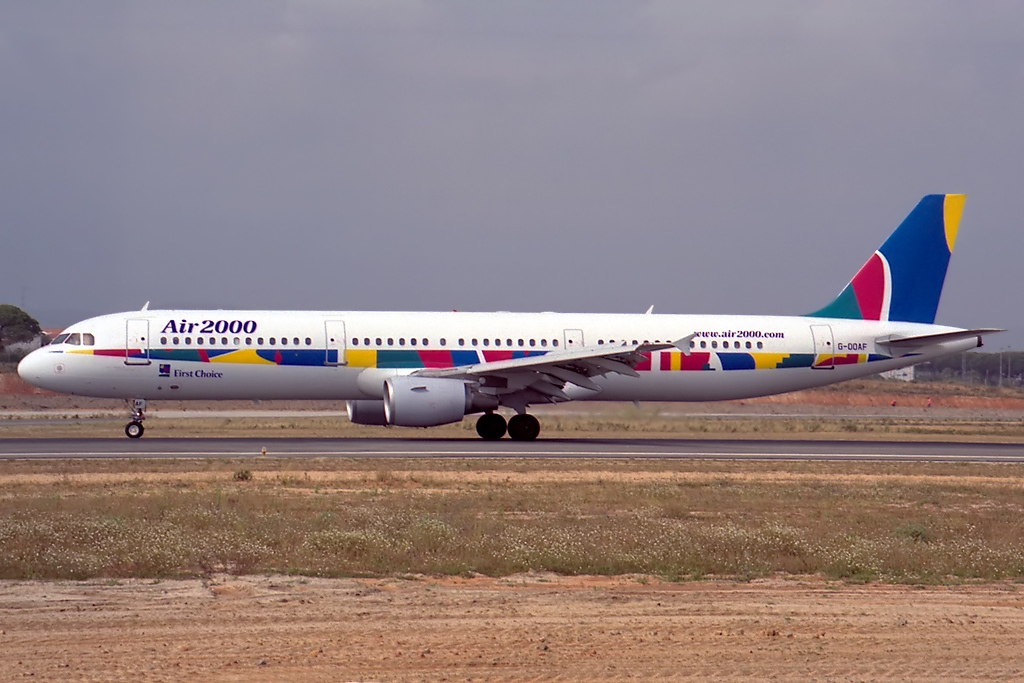
Airbus A321

First Choice Airways

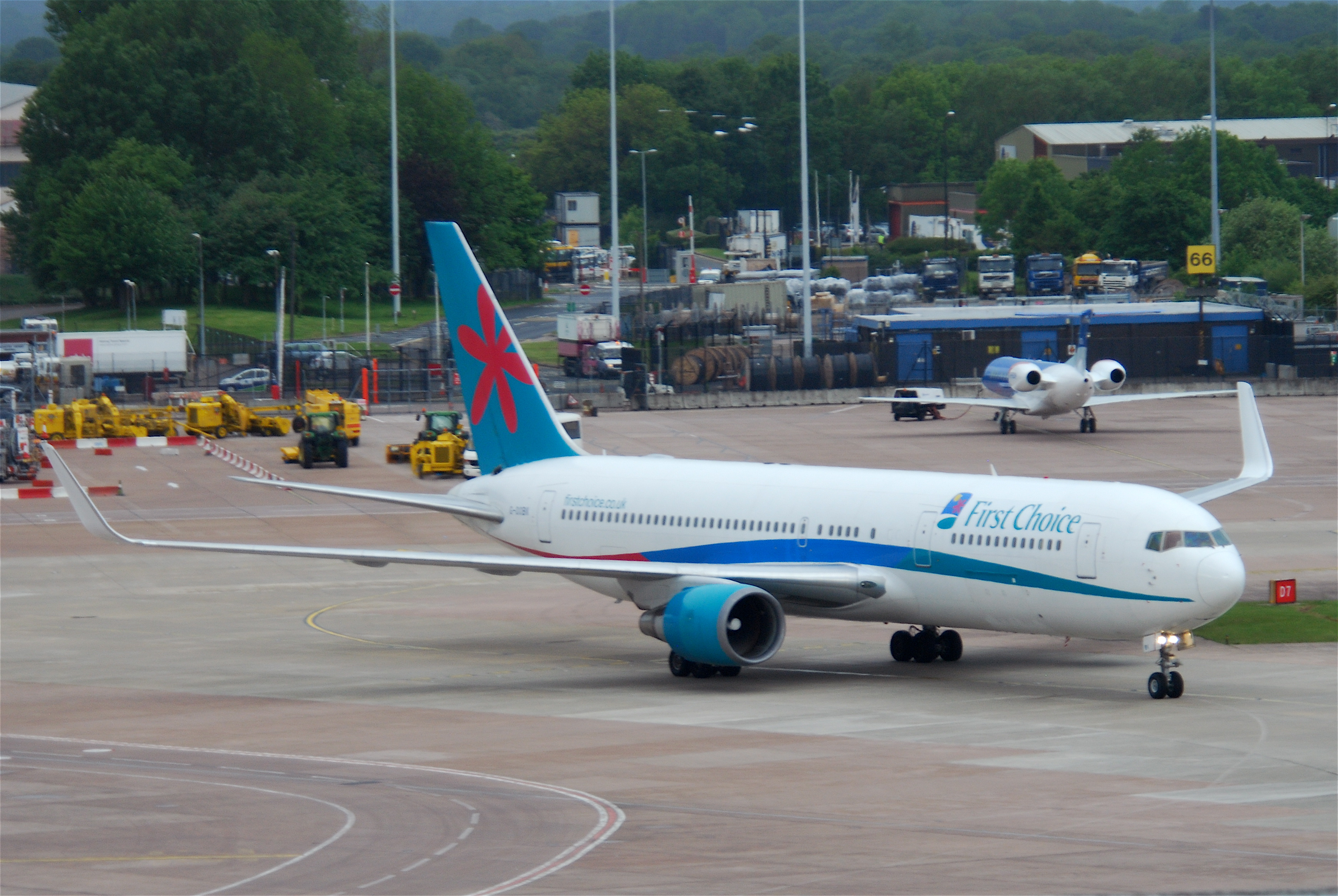
Boeing 767-324ER

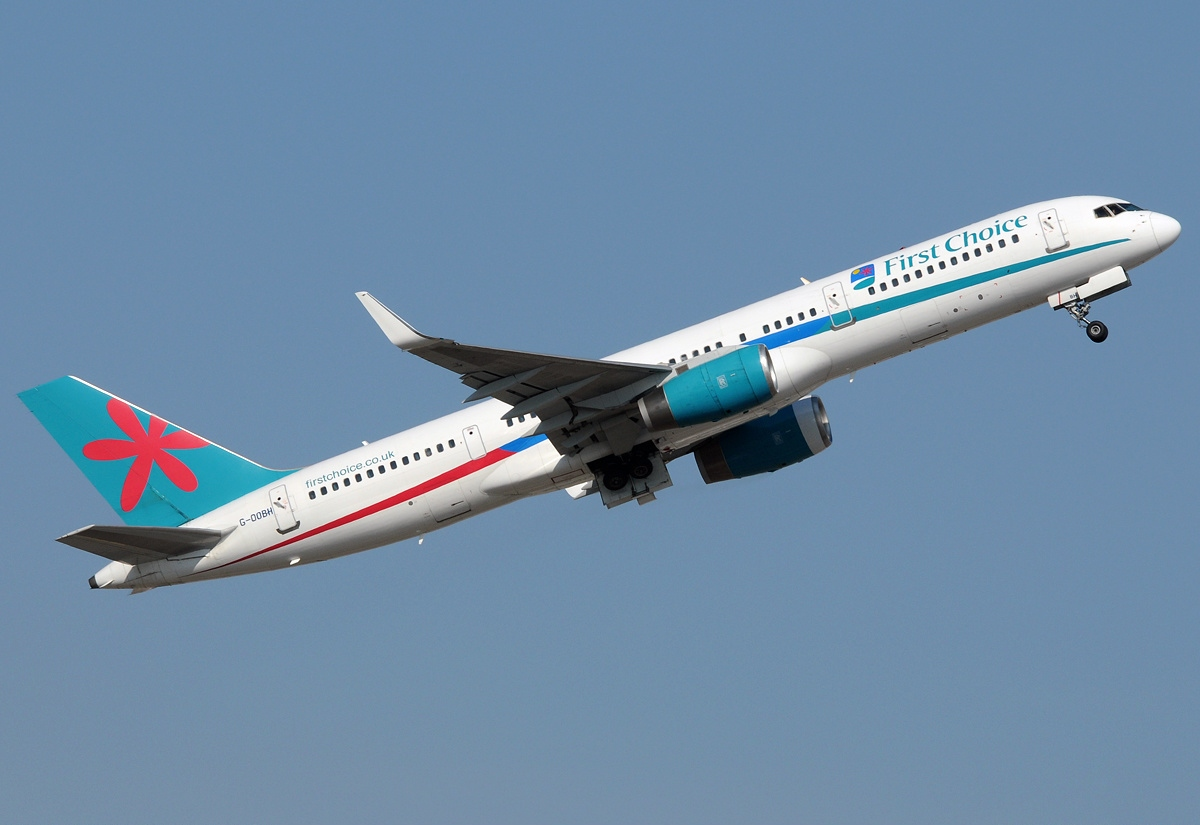
Boeing 757-236

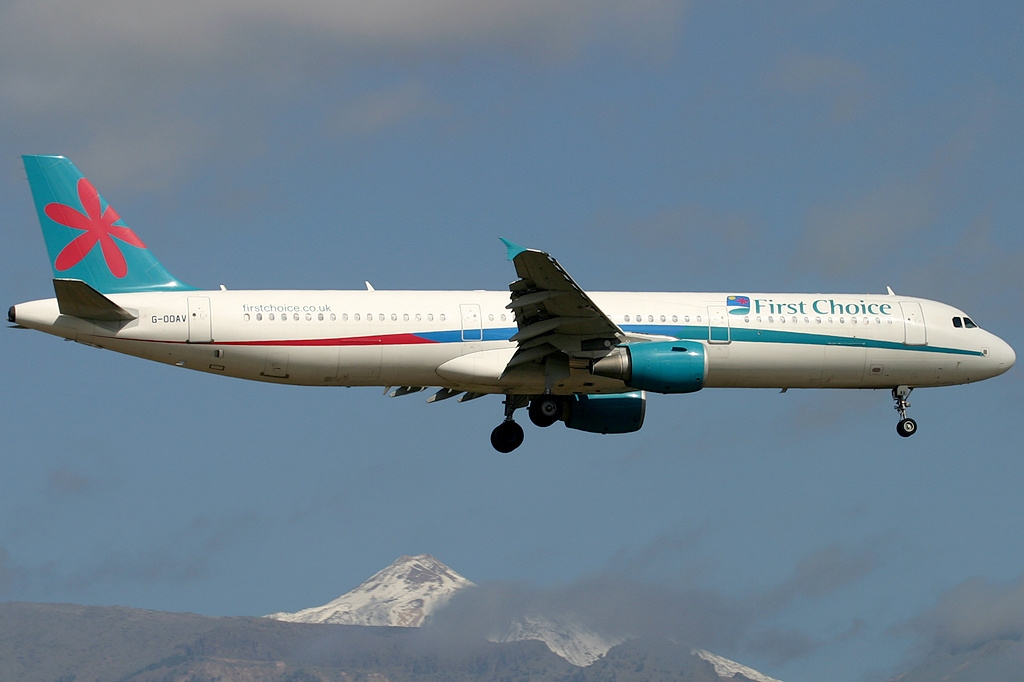
Airbus A321

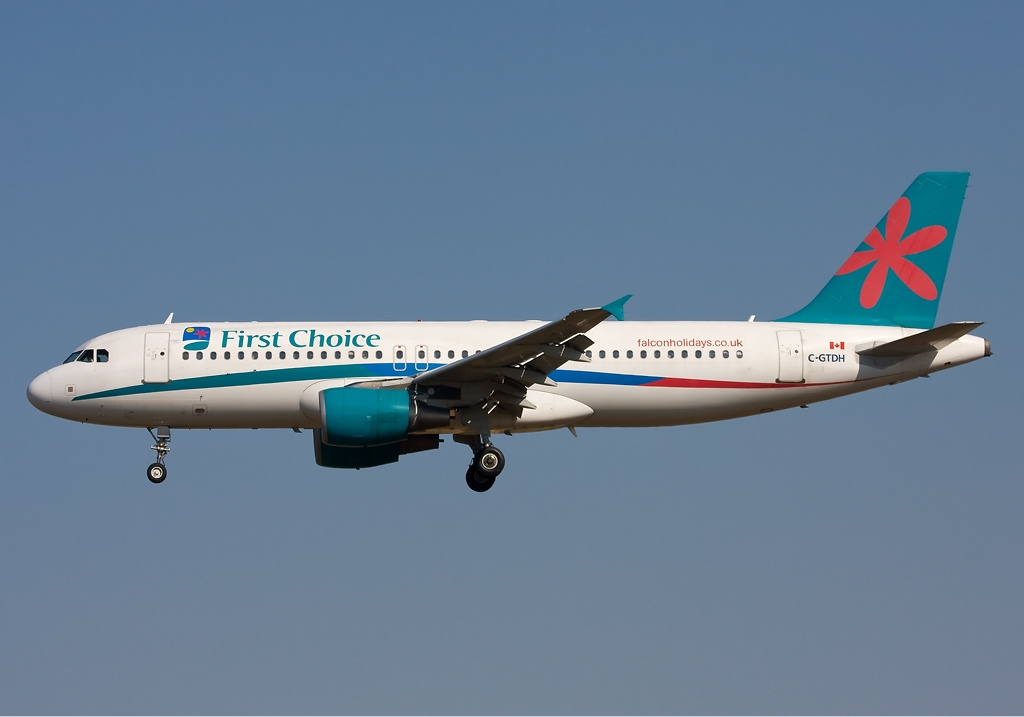
Airbus A320

== See also ==
- List of defunct airlines of the United Kingdom
