= Thomsonfly =

Charter airline of the United Kingdom (2003–2009)

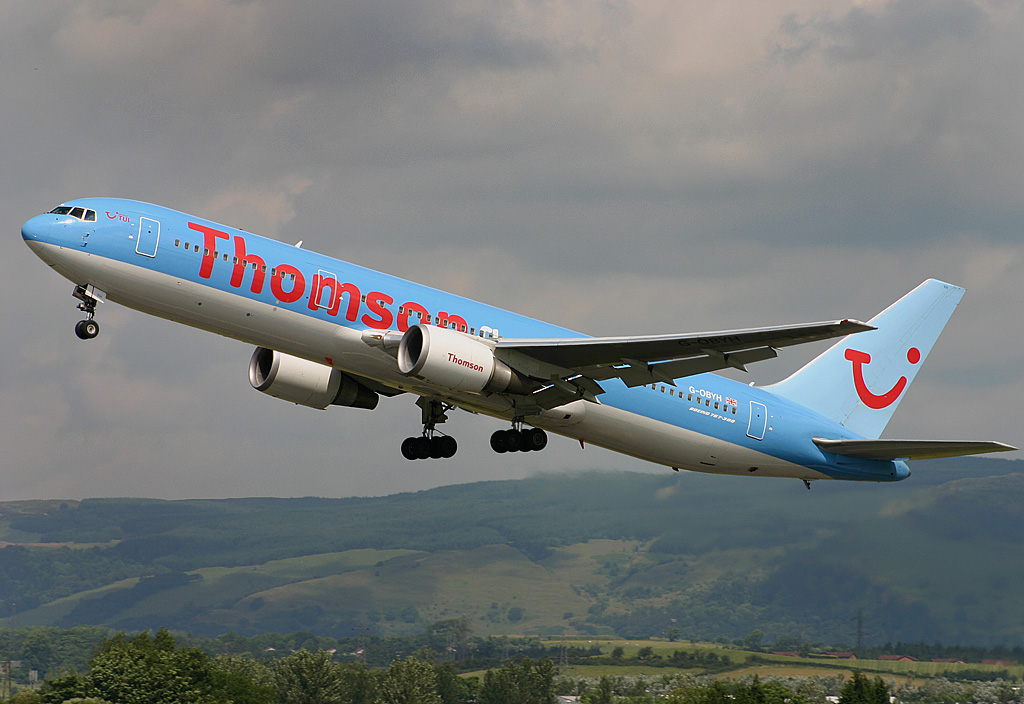
- Thomsonfly Boeing 767-300
IATA	ICAO	Call sign
BY	TOM	TOMSON
- Founded: 18 December 2003
- Commenced operations: 31 March 2004
- Ceased operations: 1 May 2009 (merged with First Choice Airways to form Thomson Airways)
- Operating bases: Belfast–International; Birmingham; Bournemouth; Cardiff; Coventry; Doncaster/Sheffield; East Midlands; Glasgow; Leeds/Bradford; Liverpool; London–Gatwick; London–Luton; London–Stansted; Manchester; Newcastle upon Tyne
- Parent company: TUI Travel plc
- Headquarters: Luton, Bedfordshire, England
- Key people: Chris Browne (MD); John Murphy (DFO); Dawn Wilson (Director of Ground Operations)
- Website: www.thomson.co.uk

Thomsonfly was a British charter and scheduled airline. It was the first stage of TUI AG's plans to expand its business within TUI UK prior to September 2007. After TUI UK merged with First Choice Holidays in September 2007, it became part of TUI Travel PLC. The new holiday company continued with both in-house airlines (Thomsonfly and First Choice Airways) through winter 2007 and summer 2008 until the two were integrated on 1 November 2008 as Thomson Airways and fully merged on 1 May 2009.

Thomsonfly held a Civil Aviation Authority Type A Operating Licence permitting it to carry passengers, cargo and mail on aircraft with 20 or more seats.

== History ==
As part of a wider reorganisation of TUI's UK operations in September 2004, it was announced that Britannia Airways would soon be rebranded Thomsonfly. Thomsonfly changed its name to Thomson Airways in October 2008 after it started integrating with First Choice Airways, a process that was completed on 1 May 2009.

== Statistics ==
	Number of passengers	Number of flights	Load factor
2005	9,505,928	52,461	80.1%
2006	9,617,416	54,063	82.6%
2007	9,444,973	54,515	84.6%
^{Source: UK Civil Aviation Authority}

== Fleet ==
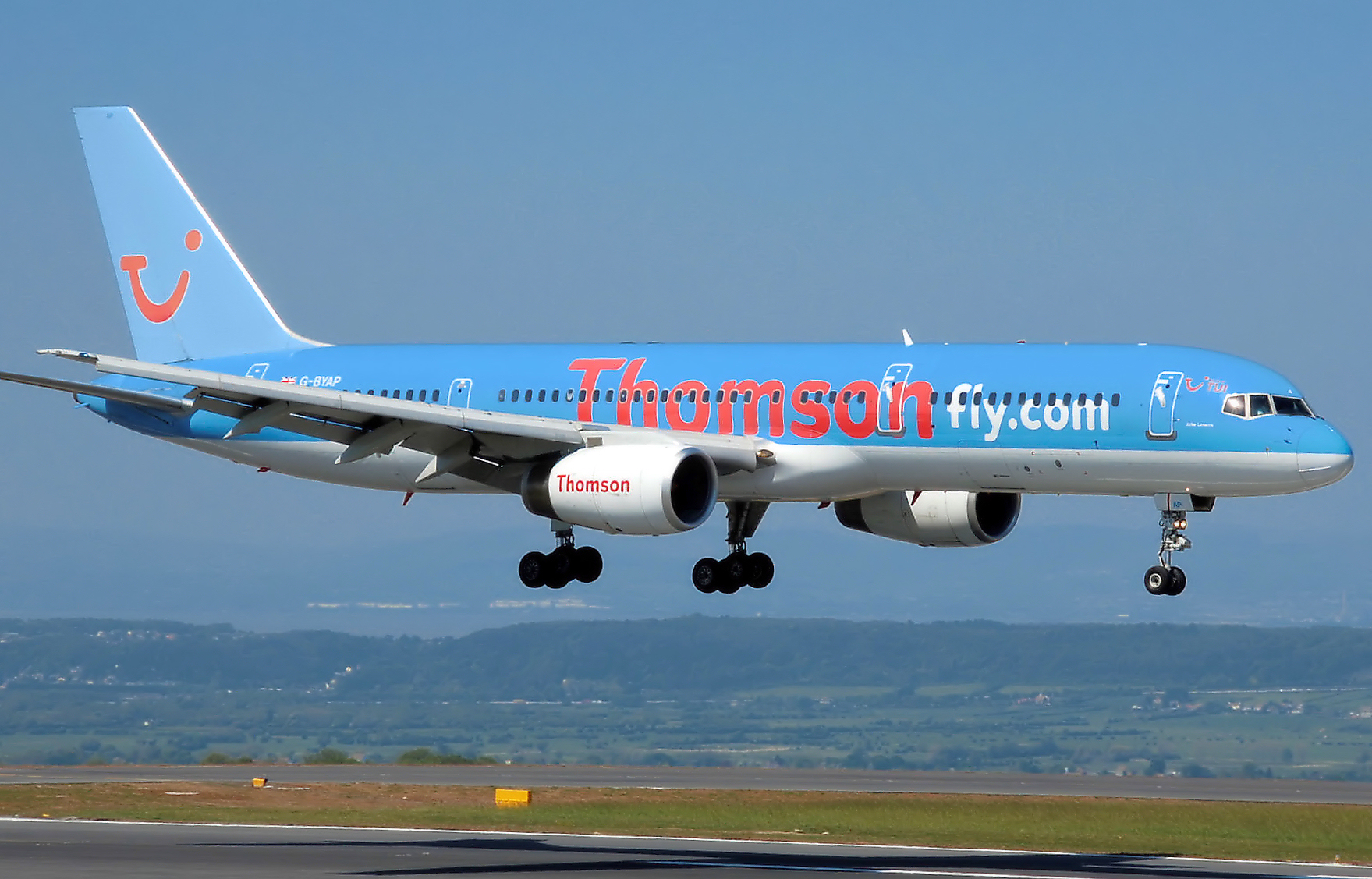
Boeing 757-200, 2007

In October 2008, Thomsonfly operated an all-Boeing fleet composed of the following aircraft:

Aircraft type	Total	Passengers	Routes
Boeing 737-300	11	148	Short and medium haul
Boeing 737-500	4	131	Short haul
Boeing 737-800	16	189	Short and medium haul
Boeing 757-200	20	235	Short and medium haul
Boeing 767-200ER	4	290	Short, medium and long haul
Boeing 767-300ER	9	283/328	Short, medium and long haul
Total	64		

== See also ==
- List of defunct airlines of the United Kingdom
