= List of defunct airlines of the Republic of Ireland =

This is a list of defunct airlines of the Republic of Ireland.

Airline	Image	IATA	ICAO	Callsign	Commenced operations	Ceased operations	Notes
Aer Lingus Commuter		EI	EIN		1984	2001	Merged into Aer Lingus
Aer Turas		QT	ATT	QUEBEC TANGO	1962	2003	
Aerlinte Eireann Teoranta/Irish International Airlines		IN			1947	1970	Merged operations into Aer Lingus
Avair					1978	1984	
Clyden Airways					1978	1981	Trading name of Mercantile Aviation
Eirjet			EIR	EIRJET	2004	2006	
EU Airways		VE	EUY	EUROAIRWAYS	?	?	
EUjet		VE	EUY	UNION JET	2003	2006	
Euroceltic Airways		5Q		WEXFORD	1999	2001	
Futura Gael		F0	FGL	APPLEWOOD	2007	2008	
Hibernian Airlines					1966	1967	Alias Air Charters of Ireland. Acquired by Emerald Airways (Belfast). Operated Douglas C-47B
Hunting Cargo Airlines		AG	ABR		1993	1998	Renamed/merged to Air Contractors
Interconair					1976	1977	Alias Intercon Air Ireland. Operated Bristol Britannia, Boeing 707-400
Iona National Airways					1931	1994	
Ireland Airways		2E	EIX	AIR EXPORTS	1991	1998	Alias El Air Exports. Operated BAe ATP, FH-227, Short 330, Short 360
Ireland West Airways					1968	1971	Operated Piper Aztec, Piper Cherokee Six
Irish Air Transport			RDK	IRISH TRANS	1993	1993	Operated Learjet 60, Short 360
JetGreen Airways					2004	2004	
JetMagic		GX	JMG	JETMAGIC	2003	2004	
Kerry Airways					1970	1977	Third Level Carrier
MyWay					2004	2004	Operated Airbus A320-200
Nex Aviation					2006	2009	Rebranded from FlyU (2006–2008)
Norwegian Air International		D8	IBK	NORTRANS	2014	2021	
Omega Airlines					1996	2000	
Shannon Air					1964	1966	Operated Douglas DC-4, Douglas DC-7
Skynet Airlines		SI	SIH	BLUEJET	2001	2004	
Sonas Aviation			SON	SONAS	2020	2020	Renamed ACASS Ireland. Operated Canadair Challenger 600
Stobart Air		RE	STK	STOBART	2014	2021	
TransAer International Airlines		T8	TLA	TRANSLIFT	1997	2000	Rebranded from Translift Airways (1991–1997)
Translift Airways		T8	TLA	TRANSLIFT	1991	1997	Rebranded as TransAer International Airlines
Virgin Express Ireland		VK	VEI	GREENISLE	1998	2001	

== See also ==
- List of airlines of the Republic of Ireland
- List of airports in Republic of Ireland
