= TUI Airways =

British airline

TUI Airways Limited

- TUI Airways Boeing 737 MAX 8
IATA	ICAO	Call sign
BY	TOM	TOMJET
- Founded: January 1962; 64 years ago (as Euravia)
- Commenced operations: 1 May 2009; 17 years ago (as Thomson Airways)
- AOC #: 294
- Operating bases: Belfast–International; Birmingham; Bournemouth; Bristol; Cardiff; East Midlands; Exeter; Glasgow; London–Gatwick; London–Stansted; Manchester; Newcastle upon Tyne; Norwich
- Fleet size: 71
- Destinations: 96
- Parent company: TUI Group
- Headquarters: Wigmore House, Luton, Bedfordshire, England
- Key people: Dawn Wilson (COO)
- Employees: 10,000 (the entire operation in the UK and Ireland)
- Website: www.tui.co.uk, www.tuiholidays.ie

TUI Airways Limited is a British scheduled and charter airline, owned and operated by the TUI Group. They fly various scheduled and charter flights from the United Kingdom and Ireland to leisure destinations in Europe, Africa, Asia and North America.

The air carrier is the fourth largest UK airline by total passengers carried, after EasyJet, British Airways and Jet2.com. It is also the world's tenth largest airline by number of route pairings served. TUI Airways holds a United Kingdom Civil Aviation Authority (CAA) Type A Operating Licence permitting it to carry passengers, cargo and mail on aircraft with 20 or more seats. Its head office and registered office is Wigmore House in Luton, Bedfordshire.

== History ==
=== Foundation and early years ===
TUI Airways has its origins in several airlines which were rivals. Britannia Airways (ex Euravia in December 1964) merged with Orion Airways, founded in 1978 by Horizon Holidays and later owned by the large brewing firm Bass Brewery and InterContinental Hotels Group, in 1989. The Britannia name was retained for the combined airline.

Britannia was rebranded to Thomsonfly in May 2005 as its parent company Thomson Travel Group was bought by TUI Group as part of a wider reorganisation of TUI's operations in the UK. Air 2000 was founded in 1987, and integrated the operations of Leisure International Airways in 1998. In 2003 the airline was renamed First Choice Airways after being bought by First Choice and became their in-house airline.

Following the merger of the travel divisions of TUI Group and First Choice Holidays in September 2007 Thomsonfly and First Choice Airways merged on 1 November 2008. The Thomson Airways name was launched for the combined airline on 1 May 2009.

The new brand retained the Thomsonfly colour scheme, and aircraft in the fleet were gradually repainted. Several First Choice Airways aircraft remained in the First Choice livery as they were due to be phased out of service. A new livery, named "Dynamic Wave" (which will also be applied on Thomson Cruises ships), was introduced in May 2012.

TUI Airways became the first UK airline to take delivery of the Boeing 787 Dreamliner, receiving the first such jetliner in May 2013. Passenger services with the aircraft began on 21 June 2013 with a flight between London Gatwick and Menorca. Also in 2013, the parent group TUI Travel, now known as TUI Group, ordered 60 Boeing 737 MAX aircraft for delivery to group airlines.

=== Rebranding and latest developments ===
On 13 May 2015, it was announced by the TUI Group that all five of TUI's airline subsidiaries would be named TUI, whilst keeping their separate Air Operators Certificate, a process taking over three years to complete. TUI Airways was the last airline to be completed in late 2017. The rebrand began in mid 2016, with the addition of the new 'TUI' titles to the fleet.

In December 2016, Thomson Holidays launched their final television advertisement using the Thomson brand, before integrating into the TUI brand. During the rebrand in 2017, the "TOMSON" callsign was dropped and replaced with "TUI AIR" and then changed again to "TOMJET".

In May 2017, the brand TUI Airways began to be used in several areas and was implemented on all flight tracker applications. Most of the aircraft had been branded with 'TUI' titles, and onboard items such as glasses and napkins carried the new brand. Thomson Airways officially changed its legal trading name to TUI Airways on 2 October 2017. TUI's sister company, TUI UK (formerly Thomson Holidays), ceased using the 'Thomson' brand, adopting the TUI UK brand on 18 October 2017.

In November 2023, TUI Airways retired their last Boeing 767 as the sole remaining passenger operator in the United Kingdom.

== Corporate affairs ==
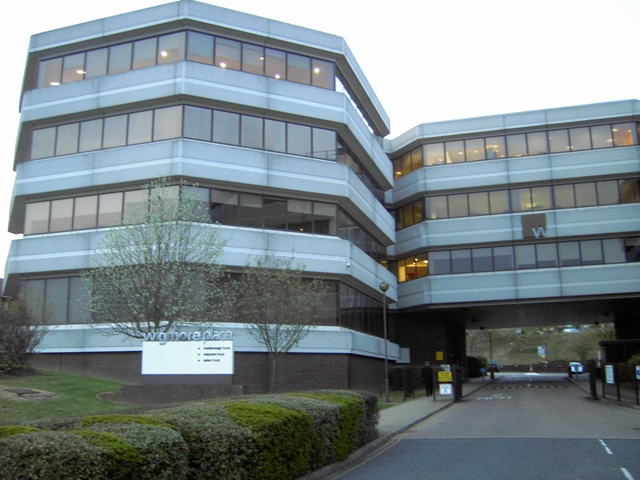
Wigmore House, the head office of TUI Airways near Luton

=== Head office ===
The airline's head office is in the Wigmore House near Luton, Bedfordshire. The facility is adjacent to Luton Airport.

=== Overview ===
The airline is part of a single-branded group, being the product of two mergers: the travel division of TUI Group with First Choice Holidays in September 2007 to form TUI Travel, under which their respective airlines, Thomsonfly and First Choice Airways, were merged under the former's Air Operator's Certificate in May 2008 and rebranded as Thomson Airways Ltd. on 1 November 2008.

The investable enterprise and overall leadership formally merged with TUI to form London (LSE) and Frankfurt (DAX) listed TUI Group since December 2014. TUI Airways officially changed its legal name from Thomson Airways to TUI Airways on 2 October 2017. This was in line with TUI airline sister companies TUI fly Belgium, TUI fly Deutschland, TUI fly Netherlands and TUI fly Nordic.

=== Business figures ===
Year	Total passengers (m)	Total flights (k)	Load factor	Passenger change (YoY)
2005*	15.5	82.9	88.6%	
2006*	15.1	83.5	88.4%	▼2.4%
2007*	15.0	82.3	89.1%	▼0.8%
2008	12.2	65.3	91.1%	▼18.5%
2009	11.2	59.1	90.2%	▼8.1%
2010	10.9	56.5	89.9%	▼2.4%
2011	11.0	57.7	89.3%	▲0.8%
2012	10.7	54.3	92.0%	▼3.1%
2013	10.5	54.9	92.4%	▼1.4%
2014	10.3	54.2	93.0%	▼1.7%
2015	10.6	53.8	93.8%	▲2.4%
2016	10.9	55.2	94.1%	▲3.1%
2017	11.2	57.6	93.5%	▲2.9%
2018	11.1	58.3	92.8%	▼0.7%
2019	11.8	60.6	92.9%	▲5.8%
2020	2.0	10.6	88.0%	▼82.9%
2021	2.0	13.8	73.9%	▲0.2%
2022	11.2	61.2	88.6%	▲458.6%
2023	11.5	60.1	91.0%	▲1.4%
2024	12.0	64.2	91.1%	▲4.9%
^{* Data for 2005 to 2007 includes First Choice Airways; Source: UK Civil Aviation Authority}

== Destinations ==
Most scheduled flights operated by TUI Airways are on behalf of tour operators. The airline offers flights to destinations around the Mediterranean, the Caribbean and the Indian Ocean from 19 base airports in the United Kingdom. Additionally, seasonal charter routes are served from Copenhagen, Dublin, Helsinki, Oslo and Stockholm.

As of February 2026, TUI Airways flies (or has flown) to the following destinations.

=== List ===
Country	City	Airport	Notes	Refs
Aruba	Oranjestad	Queen Beatrix International Airport	Terminated	
Austria	Innsbruck	Innsbruck Airport	Seasonal	
Austria	Salzburg	Salzburg Airport	Seasonal	
Barbados	Bridgetown	Grantley Adams International Airport	Seasonal	
Bulgaria	Burgas	Burgas Airport	Seasonal	
Bulgaria	Sofia	Vasil Levski Sofia Airport	Seasonal charter	
Bulgaria	Varna	Varna Airport	Terminated	
Cambodia	Sihanoukville	Sihanouk International Airport	Seasonal charter Begins 19 December 2026	
Cape Verde	Boa Vista	Aristides Pereira International Airport		
Cape Verde	Sal	Amílcar Cabral International Airport		
Costa Rica	Liberia	Guanacaste Airport		
Croatia	Dubrovnik	Dubrovnik Airport	Seasonal	
Croatia	Pula	Pula Airport	Seasonal	
Croatia	Rijeka	Rijeka Airport	Terminated	
Croatia	Split	Split Airport	Seasonal	
Cuba	Havana	José Martí International Airport	Terminated	
Cuba	Holguín	Frank País Airport	Terminated	
Cuba	Santa Clara	Abel Santamaría Airport	Terminated	
Cuba	Varadero	Juan Gualberto Gómez Airport	Terminated	
Cyprus	Larnaca	Larnaca International Airport	Seasonal	
Cyprus	Paphos	Paphos International Airport		
Denmark	Copenhagen	Copenhagen Airport	Charter Base	
Dominican Republic	La Romana	La Romana International Airport	Seasonal	
Dominican Republic	Puerto Plata	Gregorio Luperón International Airport	Seasonal charter	
Dominican Republic	Punta Cana	Punta Cana International Airport		
Egypt	Hurghada	Hurghada International Airport		
Egypt	Luxor	Luxor International Airport		
Egypt	Marsa Alam	Marsa Alam International Airport		
Egypt	Mersa Matruh	Marsa Matruh International Airport	Terminated	
Egypt	Sharm El Sheikh	Sharm El Sheikh International Airport		
Egypt	Taba	Taba International Airport	Terminated	
Finland	Helsinki	Helsinki Airport	Charter Base	
Finland	Ivalo	Ivalo Airport	Seasonal	
Finland	Kittilä	Kittilä Airport	Seasonal	
Finland	Kuusamo	Kuusamo Airport	Seasonal	
Finland	Rovaniemi	Rovaniemi Airport	Seasonal	
France	Chambéry	Chambéry Airport	Seasonal charter	
France	Toulouse	Toulouse–Blagnac Airport	Seasonal charter	
Greece	Chania	Chania International Airport	Seasonal	
Greece	Corfu	Corfu International Airport	Seasonal	
Greece	Heraklion	Heraklion International Airport	Seasonal	
Greece	Kavala	Kavala International Airport	Seasonal	
Greece	Kefalonia	Kephalonia International Airport	Seasonal	
Greece	Kos	Kos International Airport	Seasonal	
Greece	Mykonos	Mykonos Airport	Terminated	
Greece	Mytilene	Mytilene International Airport	Terminated	
Greece	Preveza/Lefkada	Aktion National Airport	Seasonal	
Greece	Rhodes	Rhodes International Airport	Seasonal	
Greece	Samos	Samos International Airport	Seasonal	
Greece	Santorini	Santorini International Airport	Seasonal	
Greece	Skiathos	Skiathos International Airport	Seasonal	
Greece	Thessaloniki	Thessaloniki Airport	Seasonal	
Greece	Zakynthos	Zakynthos International Airport	Seasonal	
Iceland	Reykjavík	Keflavík International Airport	Seasonal	
India	Goa	Dabolim Airport	Terminated	
India	Goa	Manohar International Airport	Seasonal	
Ireland	Dublin	Dublin Airport	Charter Base	
Italy	Alghero	Alghero-Fertilia Airport	Seasonal	
Italy	Catania	Catania-Fontanarossa Airport	Seasonal	
Italy	Lamezia Terme	Lamezia Terme International Airport	Seasonal	
Italy	Naples	Naples International Airport	Seasonal	
Italy	Olbia	Olbia Costa Smeralda Airport	Seasonal	
Italy	Turin	Turin Airport	Seasonal charter	
Italy	Venice	Venice Marco Polo Airport	Seasonal	
Italy	Verona	Verona Villafranca Airport	Seasonal	
Jamaica	Montego Bay	Sangster International Airport		
Jersey	Jersey	Jersey Airport	Terminated	
Kenya	Mombasa	Moi International Airport	Terminated	
Malaysia	Langkawi	Langkawi International Airport	Seasonal	
Maldives	Malé	Velana International Airport	Terminated	
Malta	Luqa	Malta International Airport		
Mauritius	Port Louis	Sir Seewoosagur Ramgoolam International Airport		
Mexico	Cancún	Cancún International Airport		
Mexico	Los Cabos	Los Cabos International Airport	Seasonal	
Mexico	Puerto Vallarta	Licenciado Gustavo Díaz Ordaz International Airport		
Montenegro	Podgorica	Podgorica Airport	Seasonal	
Morocco	Agadir	Agadir–Al Massira Airport		
Morocco	Marrakesh	Marrakesh Menara Airport		
Norway	Fagernes	Fagernes Airport, Leirin	Terminated	
Norway	Oslo	Oslo Airport, Gardermoen	Charter Base	
Norway	Trondheim	Trondheim Airport	Seasonal charter	
Portugal	Faro	Faro Airport	Seasonal	
Portugal	Funchal	Madeira Airport		
Portugal	Porto Santo	Porto Santo Airport	Seasonal	
Spain	Alicante	Alicante-Elche Miguel Hernández Airport		
Spain	Almería	Almería Airport	Seasonal	
Spain	Fuerteventura	Fuerteventura Airport		
Spain	Girona	Girona-Costa Brava Airport	Seasonal	
Spain	Ibiza	Ibiza Airport	Seasonal	
Spain	Jerez de la Frontera	Jerez Airport	Seasonal	
Spain	Lanzarote	Lanzarote Airport		
Spain	Las Palmas	Gran Canaria Airport		
Spain	Mahón	Menorca Airport	Seasonal	
Spain	Málaga	Málaga Airport		
Spain	Palma de Mallorca	Palma de Mallorca Airport	Seasonal	
Spain	Reus	Reus Airport	Seasonal	
Spain	Santa Cruz de la Palma	La Palma Airport		
Spain	Tenerife	Tenerife South Airport		
St Lucia	Saint Lucia	Hewanorra International Airport		
Sri Lanka	Colombo	Bandaranaike International Airport	Seasonal	
Sweden	Gothenburg	Göteborg Landvetter Airport	Charter Base	
Sweden	Stockholm	Stockholm Arlanda Airport	Charter Base	
Switzerland	Geneva	Geneva Airport	Seasonal charter	
Thailand	Krabi	Krabi International Airport	Seasonal charter	
Thailand	Pattaya	U-Tapao International Airport	Seasonal	
Thailand	Phuket	Phuket International Airport	Seasonal	
Tunisia	Enfidha	Enfidha–Hammamet International Airport		
Tunisia	Djerba	Djerba-Zarzis International Airport	Terminated	
Turkey	Antalya	Antalya Airport	Seasonal	
Turkey	Bodrum	Milas-Bodrum Airport	Seasonal	
Turkey	Dalaman	Dalaman Airport	Seasonal	
Turkey	İzmir	Adnan Menderes Airport	Seasonal	
United Kingdom (England)	Birmingham	Birmingham Airport	Base	
United Kingdom (England)	Blackpool	Blackpool Airport	Airport closed	
United Kingdom (England)	Bristol	Bristol Airport	Base	
United Kingdom (England)	Coventry	Coventry Airport	Airport closed	
United Kingdom (England)	Doncaster/Sheffield	Doncaster Sheffield Airport	Airport closed	
United Kingdom (England)	East Midlands	East Midlands Airport	Base	
United Kingdom (England)	Exeter	Exeter Airport	Base	
United Kingdom (England)	Kingston upon Hull	Humberside Airport	Seasonal	
United Kingdom (England)	Leeds/Bradford	Leeds Bradford Airport	Seasonal	
United Kingdom (England)	Liverpool	Liverpool John Lennon Airport	Terminated	
United Kingdom (England)	London	Gatwick Airport	Base	
United Kingdom (England)	London	Luton Airport	Base	
United Kingdom (England)	London	London Stansted Airport	Base	
United Kingdom (England)	Manchester	Manchester Airport	Base	
United Kingdom (England)	Newcastle upon Tyne	Newcastle International Airport	Base	
United Kingdom (England)	Norwich	Norwich Airport	Base	
United Kingdom (England)	Teesside	Teesside International Airport	Seasonal	
United Kingdom (Northern Ireland)	Belfast	Belfast International Airport	Seasonal Base	
United Kingdom (Scotland)	Aberdeen	Aberdeen Airport	Base	
United Kingdom (Scotland)	Edinburgh	Edinburgh Airport	Base	
United Kingdom (Scotland)	Glasgow	Glasgow Airport	Base	
United Kingdom (Wales)	Cardiff	Cardiff Airport	Base	
United States	Melbourne	Melbourne Orlando International Airport	Seasonal	
United States	Orlando	Orlando Sanford International Airport	Terminated	
Vietnam	Phu Quoc	Phu Quoc International Airport	Seasonal	

=== Airline partners ===
TUI Airways has partnerships with the following airlines:

- Aer Lingus
- AirExplore
- Air Mauritius
- AlbaStar
- Avion Express Malta
- BA CityFlyer
- British Airways
- Corendon Airlines
- easyJet
- Emirates
- Enter Air
- Fly4 Airlines
- Freebird Airlines
- Go2Sky
- KM Malta Airlines
- Qatar Airways
- Ryanair
- SunExpress
- Titan Airways
- Virgin Atlantic
- Vueling

== Fleet ==
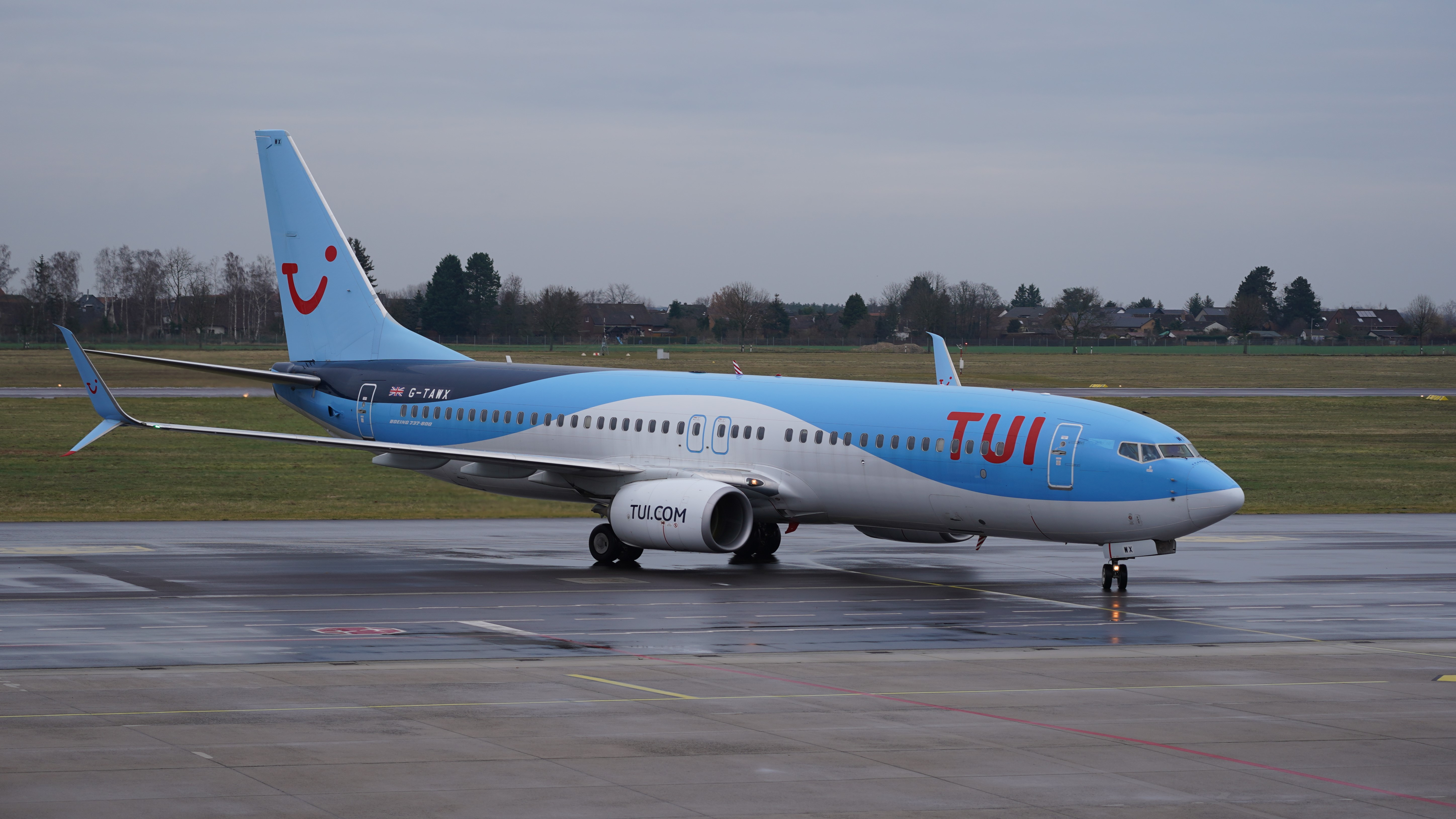
Boeing 737-800

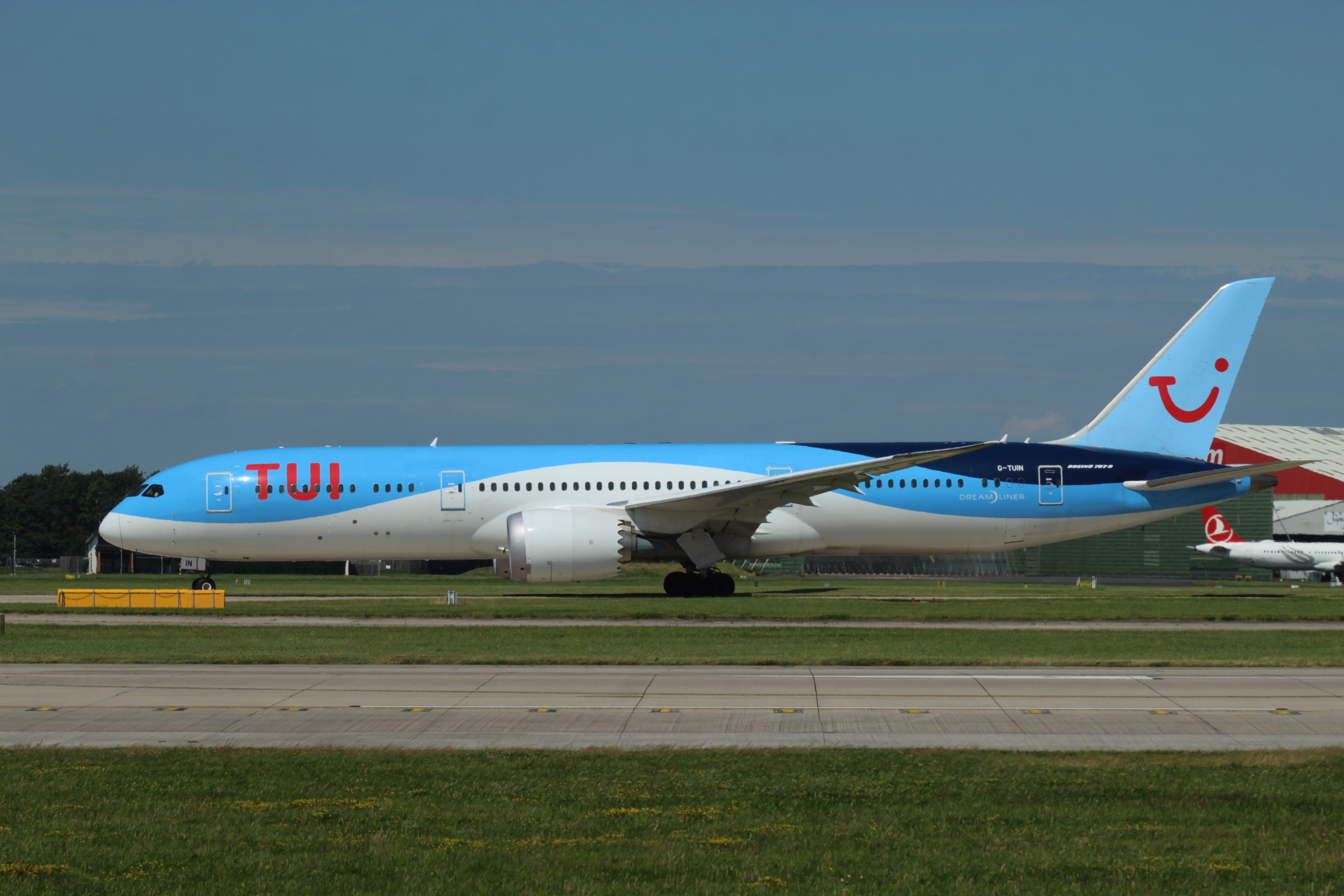
Boeing 787-9

=== Current fleet ===
As of August 2025, TUI Airways operates an all-Boeing fleet composed of the following aircraft:

Aircraft type	In service	Orders	Passengers			Remarks
Aircraft type	In service	Orders	W	Y	Total	Remarks
Boeing 737-800	33	—	—	189	189	Older aircraft to be retired.
Boeing 737 MAX 8	27	11	—	189	189	
Boeing 737 MAX 10	—	28	TBA			Deliveries delayed due to certification issues.
Boeing 787-8	8	—	47	253	300	
Boeing 787-8	8	—	—	325	325	
Boeing 787-9	5	—	63	282	345	
Total	72	40				

=== Seasonal leasing ===
In 2023, TUI Group and Enter Air agreed to set up a joint venture wet-lease ACMI operator called Fly4 Airlines. The Irish-based airline, which is set to take off in spring 2024, will take on three TUI Airways Boeing 737-800s plus one from TUI fly Belgium, and lease them back to TUI Airways during the peak summer seasons. These aircraft will then be leased to other airlines during the winter schedule when TUI operations are not at high demand. TUI had previously also leased multiple Airbus A320-200 aircraft for the summer 2023 season to cover for the delay in Boeing 737 MAX deliveries. In December 2024, TUI Airways announced it has ordered 14 additional Boeing 737 MAX 8 aircraft sign leased from BOC Aviation, to help cover the absence of the delayed MAX 10 aircraft. Older Boeing 737-800s are due to retire. It has been announced these aircraft will be delivered between 2025 and 2026.

=== Historical fleet ===
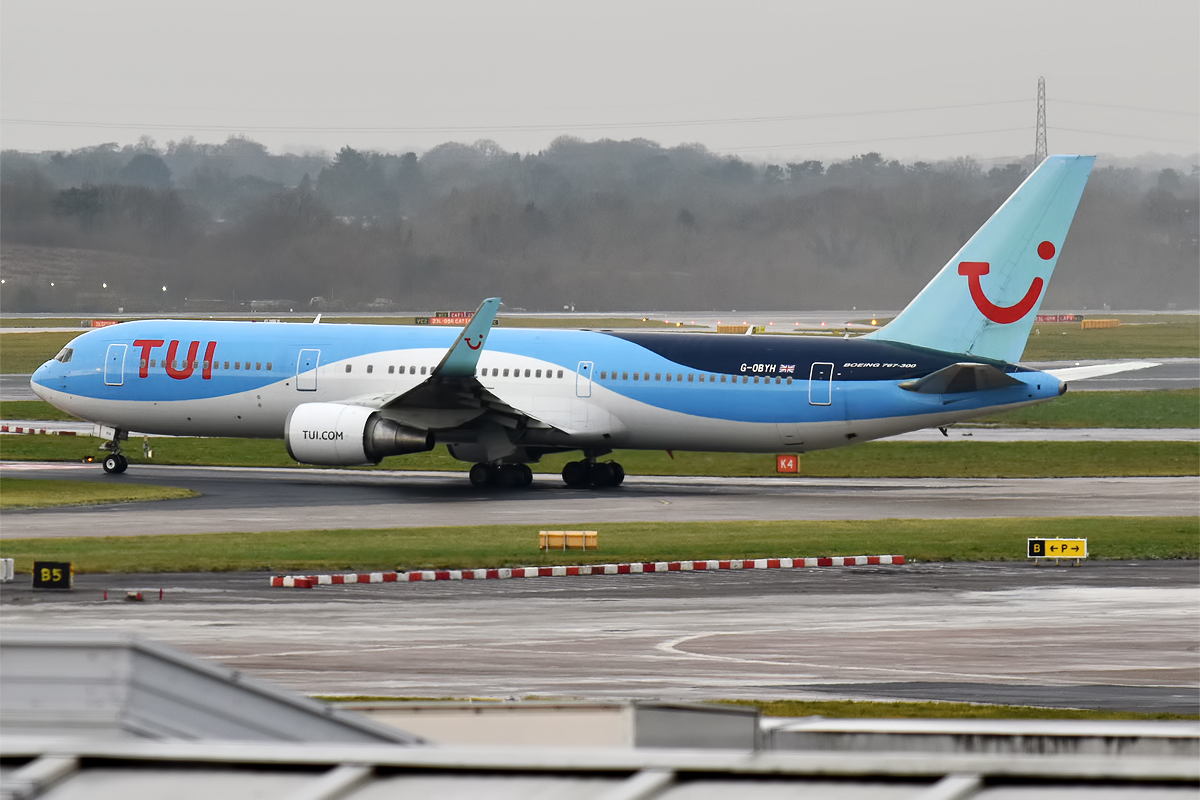
A now-retired TUI Airways Boeing 767-300ER

TUI Airways formerly operated the following aircraft:

- Airbus A320-200
- Airbus A321-200
- Boeing 737-300
- Boeing 757-200
- Boeing 767-300ER

== Accidents and incidents ==
- On 21 July 2017, Thomson Airways Flight 1526, a Boeing 737-800 operated by Sunwing Airlines, struck runway approach lights on departure from Belfast International Airport, due to an incorrect temperature input into the aircraft's flight computer, leading to an under-performance on takeoff. The aircraft continued to Corfu uneventfully, and the incident was only noticed when ground crew saw damage to the light fixtures. The incident led to several recommendations for new monitoring systems and equipment certifications.
- On 20 October 2023, TUI Airways Flight 3551, a Boeing 737-800 (registered as G-TAWD), skidded off the runway while attempting to land at Leeds Bradford Airport in heavy rain caused by Storm Babet. There were no injuries reported, but the airport subsequently closed while the aircraft was recovered. The airport reopened on 21 October 2023. The aircraft was repaired and returned to service.
- On 4 March 2024, TUI Airways Flight 6114, a Boeing 737-800 (registered as G-FDZS) barely cleared the A38 road by less than 100ft during take off at Bristol Airport. The AAIB determined that the plane's autothrottle was disconnected uncommanded due to a known fault with voltage being supplied to the autothrottle servo motor in 737s.

== See also ==
- List of airlines of the United Kingdom
