= EUY =

EUY may refer to:

- European Union of Yoga, international non-profit yoga organisation
- EUY, ICAO code for EU Airways and EUjet, defunct airlines in Ireland
- EUY, a European country-specific code for the Samsung Galaxy Tab S8
