= Iona National Airways =

Irish airline, 1931–1995

- Founded: 1931
- Ceased operations: 1995
- Hubs: Finglas, Dublin
- Key people: Pearse Cahill

Iona National Airways was Ireland's first commercial airline. Based at Kildonan Aerodrome and Collinstown Dublin, it operated between 1931 and 1995.

== History ==
=== Early beginnings ===
When Hugh Cahill started an aviation wing of his motor company - Iona - at Cross Guns Bridge in Dublin in 1931, he was already well-known as a Dublin entrepreneur. Initially, the Irish Government did not back the proposal for a civil aerodrome and refused to allow Cahill a licence. It was not until after a few months in operation, when Iona National Airways flights became frequent and after Baldonnel was no longer seen as a location for civil aviation, that the licence was granted.

Cahill's chosen site for the aerodrome was at Kildonan House near Finglas in Dublin. The site was approximately 3 miles from his garage, making it easy to service aircraft back at base, at Cross Guns Bridge. Iona National Airways operated out of Kildonan for two years until mid 1933, when Cahill's attentions were re-focused on his motor business. Despite this, two other airlines were to operate from Kildonan, including Dublin Air Ferries (DAF), which was run and owned by the noted aviator Lady Mary Heath and her husband, Jack Williams.

=== Returning to the air ===
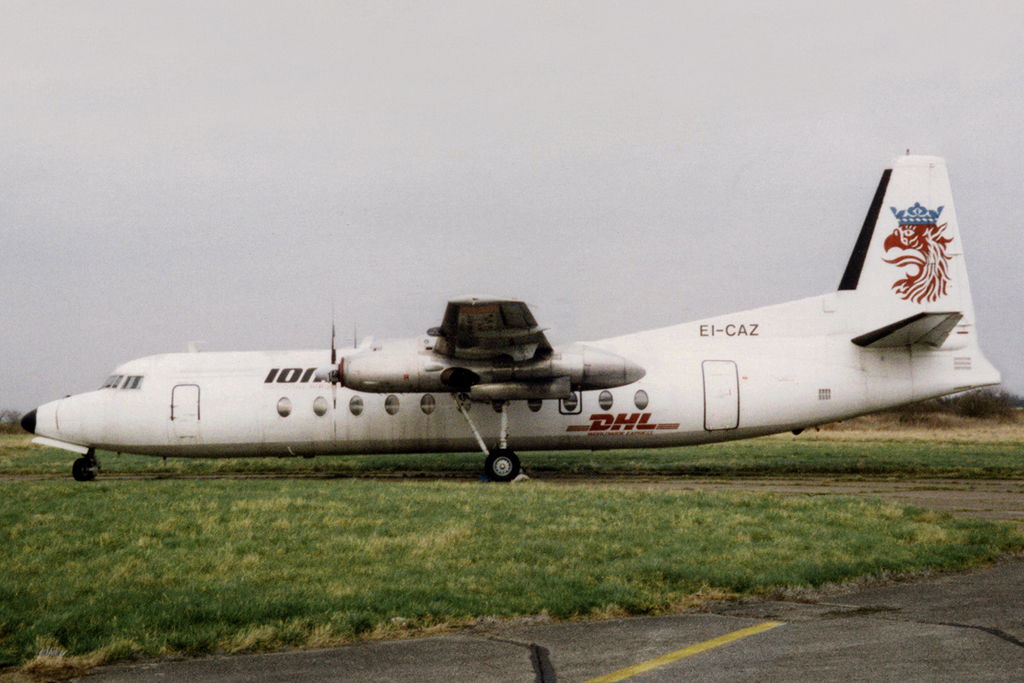
Iona National Airways Fairchild-Hiller FH-227 in 1994

In 1955 Pearse Cahill, Hugh Cahill's son, recognised an opportunity in the Irish Aviation market (Ireland had no major flying club, and no major secondary airline). Aer Lingus was also struggling to survive in the economic recessions of Ireland (which allowed for other enterprises to develop). Pearse did not rush into creating a modern airline, possibly because the money he received from his father to do other things (especially not to fly) may not have been enough to buy larger aircraft. Nonetheless, Pearse bought and shipped three ex-RAF DH Chipmunk aircraft into Ireland. This was to restart the Irish Aero Club, rivalling activities at nearby Weston airfield. Soon afterwards, Pearse realised that he could make aviation in Ireland profitable for Iona, and he imported aircraft for flying clubs around the country, firmly establishing the country with companies such as Cessna and Piper, as well as handling the majority of engine overhauls at Dublin Airport.

Iona flourished; media reporters would rent out Iona aircraft for air-to-ground photographs and for media reports. An Iona aircraft was used to capture images of the Stardust Disco tragedy from the air. In the late 1970s, Iona delivered Cessna 172's to the Irish Air Corps, several of which are still flying today. Throughout the early 1980s, Iona served the market with international air ambulances, regional services and flight training.

=== Decline and liquidation ===
Following the demise of Avair in February 1984 Iona operated a number of their regional routes, such as Dublin-Sligo.

When Ireland West Airport was officially opened on 30 May 1986, Peter Cahill flew the Taoiseach Charles Haughey and Pearse Cahill, from Dublin to Knock to perform the official opening ceremony in the presence of Monsignor James Horan.

By the early 1990s, Iona had suffered economic problems. It was further affected by the decision of FedEx and DHL to end services to Ireland. Other problems included issues with several statutory governing bodies. Iona may have had an opportunity to restructure, but political conditions were unfavourable. These factors led to the liquidation of Iona National Airways Limited in 1995, having flown its last flight on 14 December 1994.

=== After-effects ===
Ryanair, Loganair and Aer Arann eventually took over most of the Iona passenger routes, and today, Air Contractors, one of Europe's biggest cargo carriers, operate some of their old routes. To the Irish flying community, however, the main loss was the option provided by Iona to learn how to fly relatively cheaply. Iona had entertained enthusiasts at their facilities, as well as supporting non-commercial aviation with fly-ins, open days, aviation events, and a flying club. These outlets were not replaced.

== Fleet ==
- Cessna 208
- Fairchild FH-227
- Fokker F27
