= Enfidha–Hammamet International Airport =

Enfidha–Hammamet International Airport Aéroport international d'Enfidha-Hammamet

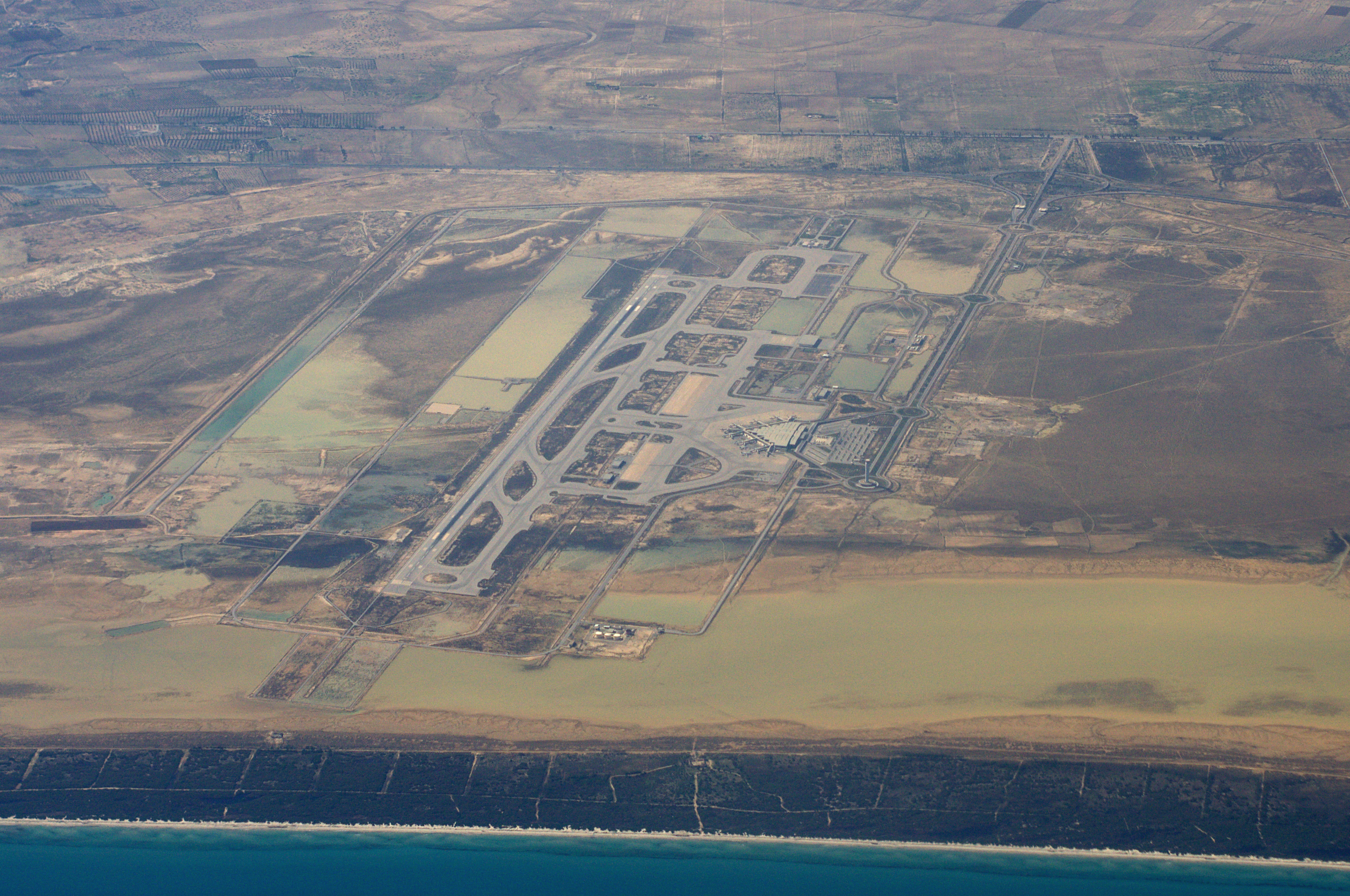
- IATA: NBE; ICAO: DTNH

Summary
- Airport type: Public
- Owner: Tunisian Airport Authority
- Operator: TAV Airports Holding
- Location: Enfidha, Tunisia
- Coordinates: 36°04′33″N 10°26′19″E
- Website: enfidhahammametairport.com

Map
- Location in Tunisia

Runways
Direction	Length		Surface
Direction	ft	m	Surface
09/27	10,827	3,300	Asphalt

Statistics (2024)
- Passengers: 1,290,699

Enfidha–Hammamet International Airport (IATA: NBE, ICAO: DTNH) is an airport in Enfidha, Tunisia, located about 40 kilometres (25 miles) southwest from the town of Hammamet. The airport is mostly used by European airlines bringing travellers to Tunisian holiday resorts.

== Airlines and destinations ==
The following airlines operate regular scheduled and charter flights at Enfidha–Hammamet Airport:

Airlines	Destinations
AirBaltic	Seasonal charter: Riga
Avion Express	Seasonal charter: Vilnius
Belavia	Seasonal charter: Minsk
Bulgaria Air	Seasonal charter: Sofia, Varna
easyJet	Basel/Mulhouse, Birmingham, Bristol, Edinburgh, Geneva, Liverpool, London–Gatwick, London–Luton, London–Southend, Manchester, Newcastle upon Tyne; Seasonal: Belfast–International, Glasgow
Enter Air	Seasonal charter: Łódź
European Air Charter	Seasonal charter: Plovdiv
Fly Lili	Seasonal charter: Bucharest–Băneasa
Jet2.com	Seasonal: Birmingham (begins 1 May 2027), East Midlands (begins 1 May 2027), Leeds/Bradford (begins 1 May 2027), London–Stansted (begins 2 May 2027), Manchester (begins 7 May 2027)
Smartwings	Seasonal charter: Brno, Ostrava, Prague
TAP Air Portugal	Seasonal charter: Lisbon
TUI Airways	Seasonal: Bristol, Glasgow, London–Stansted
TUI fly Netherlands	Seasonal charter: Dublin

== Statistics ==
Year	Number of passengers
2010	496,641
2011	▲1,281,963
2012	▲2,082,487
2013	▲2,272,074
2014	▼2,215,428
2015	▼896,601
2016	▼800,581
2017	▼717,493
2018	▲930,113
2019	▲1,453,863
STATS

Top 5 Markets (2021)
Rank	Destination
1	Russia
2	Bulgaria
3	Poland
4	Czech Republic
5	Romania

== Ground transport ==
A bus exists from the airport to the nearby town of Enfidha. From Enfidha, louages (shared taxis) can be taken to Tunis or Sousse.
