= Pádraig Ó Céidigh =

Irish former politician and businessman (born 1957)

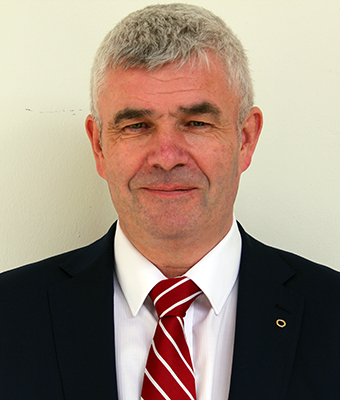
- Ó Céidigh in 2016

Senator
- In office 8 June 2016 – 29 June 2020
- Constituency: Nominated by the Taoiseach

Personal details
- Born: 2 January 1957 (age 69) Connemara, County Galway, Ireland
- Party: Independent
- Spouse: Caitlín Uí Chéidigh (m. 1983)
- Children: 4
- Education: University College Galway; Harvard University
- Occupation: Entrepreneur, aviation

Pádraig Ó Céidigh (Irish pronunciation: [ˈˈpˠaːd̪ˠɾˠəɟ oː ˈceːdʲiː]; born 2 January 1957) is an Irish former independent politician and businessman who served as a Senator from 2016 to 2020, after being nominated by the Taoiseach. He is the former owner of Aer Arann and Aer Arann Islands.

He gained a B.Comm. from University College Galway in 1978. He worked as an accountant and then as a teacher at Coláiste Iognáid, went on to study law and began practicing with his own firm in the city.

Ó Céidigh purchased Aer Arann in 1994 with Eugene O'Kelly and grew it into a regional airline. Aer Arann was purchased by Stobart Group in the 2010s, becoming Stobart Air, and Ó Céidigh sold the standalone Aer Arann Islands in 2020.

He ran unsuccessfully for one of the three Seanad seats allocated to the National University of Ireland, losing on transfers despite being third on first preferences, but was nominated to the 25th Seanad by Taoiseach Enda Kenny on 11 May 2016.

Ó Céidigh served as a member of the Governing Board of the Irish state broadcaster RTÉ prior to his appointment to the Seanad.

In March 2018, he announced his intention to stand in the 2018 presidential election against incumbent President Michael D. Higgins, as an independent candidate, but subsequently did not stand in the election.
