= Fly4 Airlines =

Irish airline

- A Fly4 Airlines Boeing 737-800.
IATA	ICAO	Call sign
F4	FFA	SUNSHINE
- Founded: August 2023; 3 years ago
- Commenced operations: March 2024; 2 years ago
- Ceased operations: November 11, 2026
- Fleet size: 4
- Parent company: Enter Air (51%), TUI Group (49%)
- Headquarters: Dublin Airport, Ireland
- Key people: Jochen Schnadt (CEO)
- Website: fly4airlines.com

Fly4 Airlines was an Irish ACMI and charter airline headquartered at Dublin Airport, Ireland. It was a joint venture between the Polish charter carrier Enter Air and the German tourism company TUI Group.

== History ==
Fly4 Airlines was established in August 2023 as a strategic partnership between Enter Air and TUI Group. Under the ownership structure, Enter Air held a 51% majority stake, while TUI Group held the remaining 49%. The airline was conceived to provide flexible capacity solutions (wet-leasing) to the TUI Group and other third-party carriers during peak demand periods.

The airline received its air operator's certificate (AOC) from the Irish Aviation Authority on 5 March 2024, and commenced operations on 10 March 2024, with a fleet of four Boeing 737-800 aircraft.

During its 2025 summer season, the airline significantly expanded its operations, supporting TUI Airways operations at Birmingham, East Midlands and Norwich. In late 2025, Fly4 announced its first major international expansion outside of Europe, entering a winter ACMI agreement with the Indian carrier SpiceJet to base aircraft in Delhi.

On 11 November 2026, Fly4 Airlines entered liquidation and ceased operations.

== Operations ==
Unlike traditional commercial airlines, Fly4 Airlines did not sell tickets directly to consumers. Instead, it operates on behalf of other airlines using the ACMI (Aircraft, Crew, Maintenance, and Insurance), and charter airline models. While its primary launch customer was TUI Airways, it had also provided services for other European carriers, including Sundair.

== Destinations ==
Fly4 Airlines operated to various international destinations across Europe, North Africa, and Asia, depending on the requirements of its leasing partners.

== Fleet ==
=== Final fleet ===
As of July 2026, Fly4 Airlines operated the following aircraft:

Fly4 Airlines fleet
Aircraft	In service	Orders	Passengers
Boeing 737-800	4	—	189
Total	4	—	

=== Former fleet ===
As of September 2024, Fly4 Airlines operated 4 Boeing 737-800.

== See also ==
- List of airlines of Ireland
- Transport in Ireland
