= First Choice (UK) =

UK travel agency and tour operator

First Choice Holidays Limited
- Formerly: First Choice Holidays plc (1994–2008)
- Type: Private Limited Company; Subsidiary
- Industry: Travel
- Founded: 1973; 53 years ago (as a group); 2011; 15 years ago (as a brand of TUI Group)
- Headquarters: Luton, England
- Area served: United Kingdom
- Key people: Bart Quinton Smith (Managing Director) Retrieved 10 January 2022
- Products: Charter and scheduled passenger airlines, package holidays, cruise lines, hotels and resorts
- Brands: Holiday Village (Hotel Brand); Splashworld (Hotel Brand)
- Owner: TUI Group
- Parent: TUI UK Limited
- Website: www.firstchoice.co.uk

First Choice Holidays Limited (trading as First Choice) is a British online travel agency and tour operator, headquartered in Luton, England. It is a subsidiary of TUI UK, itself a subsidiary of TUI Group, and its holidays are sold solely online. It also operates own brand hotels.

First Choice Holidays previously traded as a subsidiary of First Choice Group plc until its merger with TUI Travel plc in 2007. The company was then revived as a brand in 2011 under the TUI Group brand umbrella.

== History ==
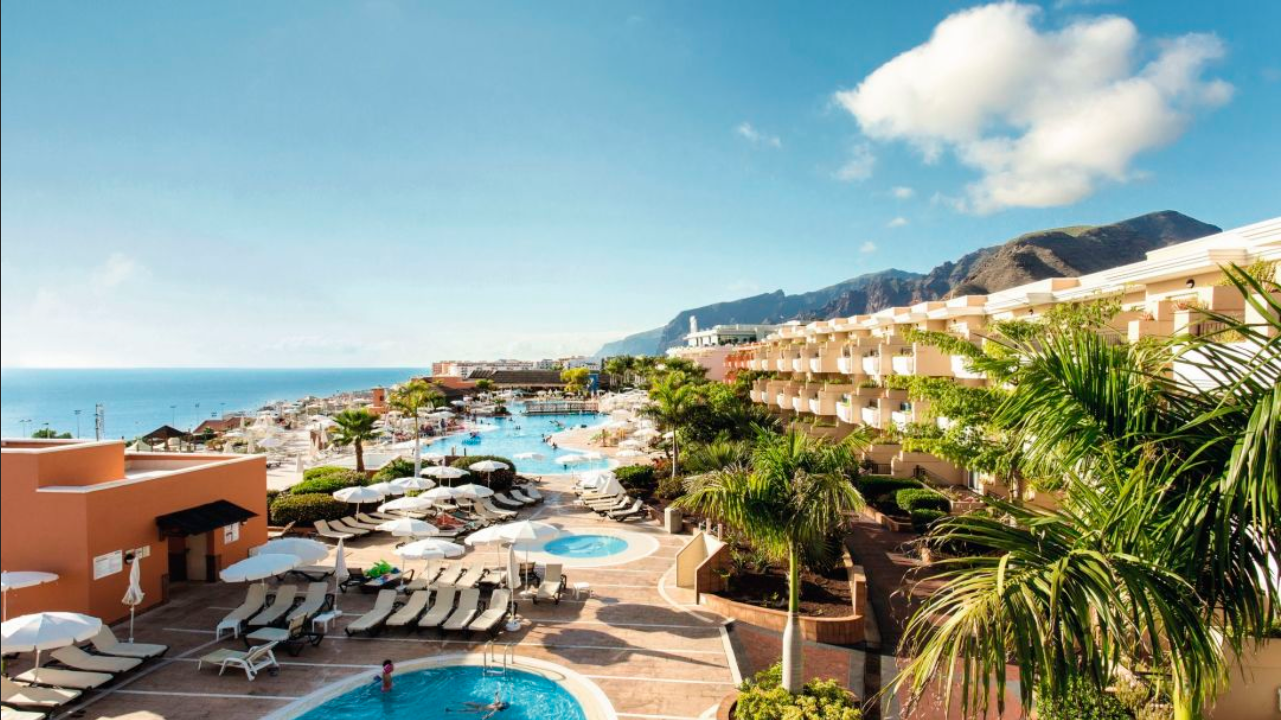
Landmar Costa Los Gigantes on the Canary Islands, Spain

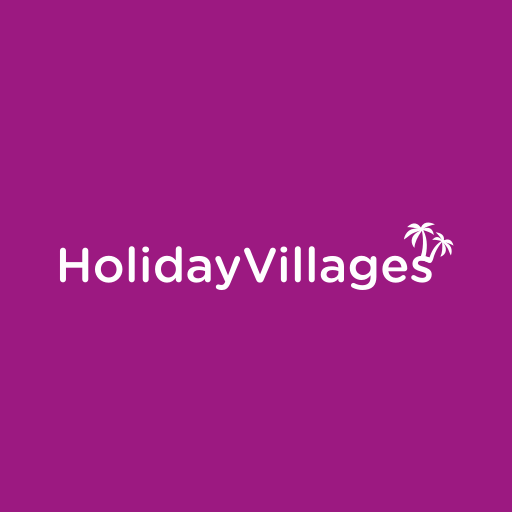
First Choice HolidayVillages Hotel brand

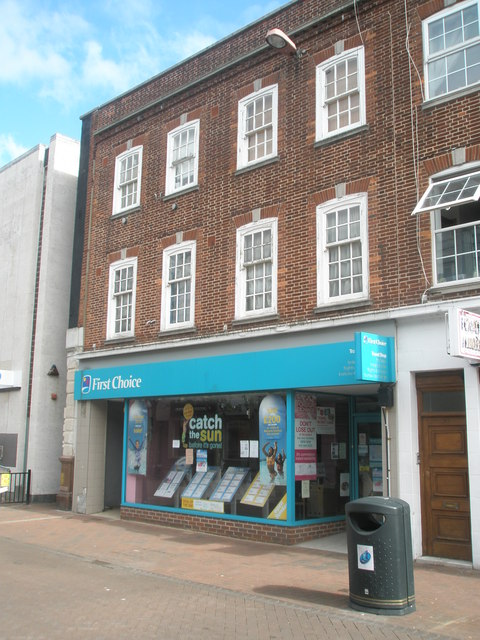
A former First Choice Travel Agent in Gosport, England

=== Operations as a Public Limited Company ===
The company (originally named Owners Abroad) was founded in 1973 by Neil Scott and Harry Musaphia, both former London taxi-drivers, ice-cream truck-operators and movie extras, operating as a travel agent. It first listed on the London Stock Exchange in 1982 with Scott as chairman and CEO.

In 1987, the group launched Air2000 and in 1990 it acquired Redwing under the guidance of Howard Klein, who had replaced Scott as CEO.

The company was renamed First Choice in 1994.

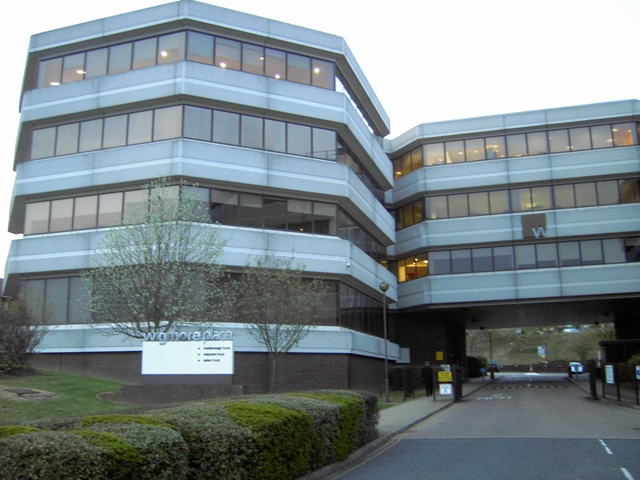
First Choice's co-located headquarters with TUI UK at Wigmore House, Luton.

In July 2005, First Choice Holidays purchased the Europe Express group of companies consisting of multi-channel distribution companies including: go-today.com for direct to consumer vacation packages, E.E.I. Travel and Brian Moore International Tours (BMIT) with travel agent distribution, Travel Services Europe (TSE), the contracting division for hotels and travel services throughout Europe.

Logo used until 2023

=== Merger with TUI Travel plc ===
In March 2007, the merger of the travel division of TUI AG with First Choice Group plc was announced. The European Commission approved the merger on 4 June 2007, on the condition that the merged company sell Budget Travel in Ireland. The merged company, TUI Travel PLC, began operations in September 2007.

TUI and First Choice's in-house airlines, Thomsonfly and First Choice Airways, were brought together under the former's Air Operator's Certificate in May 2008, and the merged airline was rebranded as Thomson Airways in November 2008.

In October 2011 it was announced that under a two-year rebranding programme, the store estate would be rebranded as "Thomson featuring First Choice" to create a single travel agency brand; the First Choice branding and uniform will be phased out, and the First Choice name will be used for all-inclusive package holidays sold by the combined network.

The company confirmed in January 2013 that it had received a proposal from its parent to merge. In May 2013, the chief executive of TUI AG ruled out a merger with TUI Travel. In an about-face in June 2014 the two companies announced they had agreed terms on a merger. The merger was completed and TUI Travel was de-listed from the London Stock Exchange on 17 December 2014.

Following the merger, Thomson Airways officially changed its legal name to TUI Airways on 2 October 2017.

== Operations ==
=== Hotel Brands ===
Name	Hotels	Country	Type
Splashworld	34	Bulgaria Cyprus Dominican Republic Egypt Greece Morocco Spain Tunisia Turkey	Waterpark Hotels
Holiday Village	9	Cyprus Egypt Greece Spain Turkey Dominican Republic	Family Hotels
