= Pearse Cahill =

Irish aviation pioneer

- Born: 26 January 1917; Dublin, Ireland
- Died: 7 December 2011 (aged 94); Skerries, County Dublin, Ireland
- Occupations: Aviator, racing driver

Pearse Cahill (26 January 1917 – 7 December 2011) was an Irish aviation pioneer and racing driver. His father started Iona National Airways in 1930 and Pearse operated the airline for many years.

== Family ==
Cahill was married to Constance and had three children – Enda, Hugh and Peter.

== Aviation ==
In 1933, Cahill made his first solo flight at Kildonan.

== Motor racing ==
Cahill began racing his mother's Hillman Minx in 1936, before later obtaining his own MG Magnette which he rebuilt and raced as the Iona Special. The culmination of his racing career would be his successes in the 1950 Leinster Trophy over the Wicklow circuit and the Sexton Trophy championship that same year. He would also share a class victory with Redmond Gallagher in the 1953 RAC Tourist Trophy at Dundrod and was president of the Irish Motor Racing Club for a period.
