= List of airlines of the Republic of Ireland =

This is a list of airlines of Ireland.

== Scheduled airlines ==
Airline	Image	IATA	ICAO	Callsign	Founded
Aer Arann Islands		—	—	—	1970
Aer Lingus		EI	EIN	SHAMROCK	1936
CityJet		WX	BCY	CITY-IRELAND	1992
Emerald Airlines		EA	EAI	GEMSTONE	2020
Fly4 Airlines		F4	FFA	SUNSHINE	2023
Ryanair		FR	RYR	RYANAIR	1984
SAS Connect		SL	SZS	SPINNAKER	2017

== Cargo airlines ==
Airline	Image	IATA	ICAO	Callsign	Founded
ASL Airlines Ireland		5H	ABR	CONTRACT	1972

== ACMI & leasing companies ==
Airline	Image	IATA	ICAO	Callsign	Founded
Nordic Aviation Capital					1990

== See also ==
- List of defunct airlines of the Republic of Ireland
- List of airports in Ireland
- Transport in Ireland
