= Nex Aviation =

Irish charter airline

IATA	ICAO	Call sign
-	-	-
- Founded: 2007
- Ceased operations: 2009
- Hubs: Galway; Waterford
- Fleet size: 2
- Headquarters: Galway, Ireland
- Key people: Peter O’Mara
- Website: www.NexAviation.com

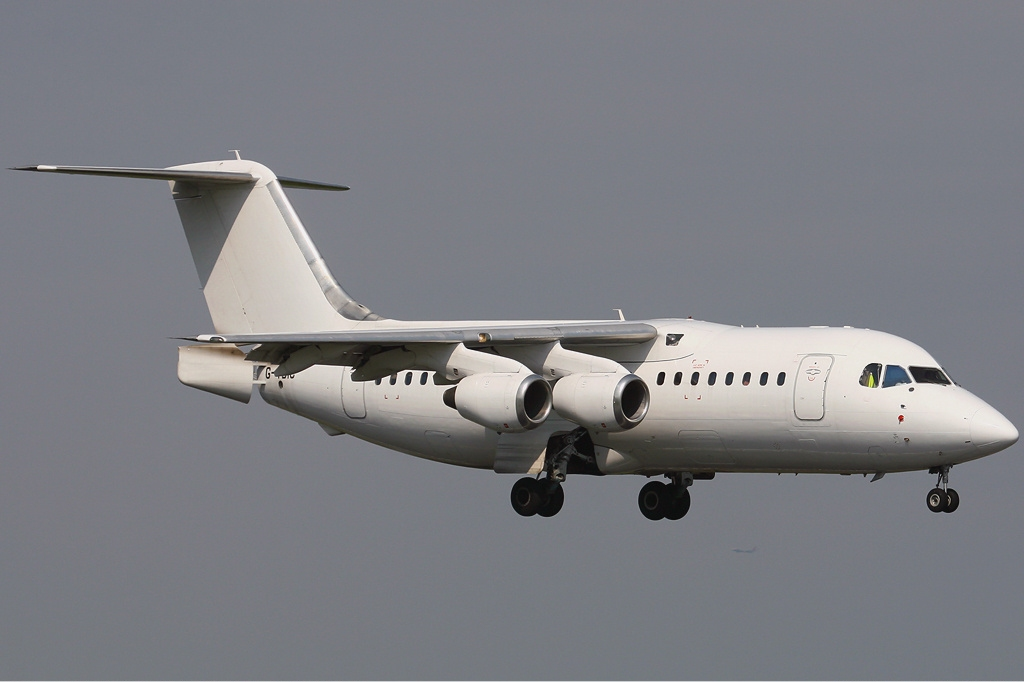
A Nex Aviation BAe 146-200A.

Nex Aviation was a charter airline, based in Galway, Ireland, which began operations on 1 July 2007, using two former Flightline BAe 146-200. The airline mainly flew from Waterford and Galway on behalf of the Irish regional operator, Aer Arann, during the summer months.

== Fleet ==
The Nex Aviation fleet consists of the following aircraft, as of 19 December 2008:

- 2 BAe 146-200 The airline's two BAe 146-200s are currently flown under Flightline's AOC.

== See also ==
- Transport in Ireland
