= Go2Sky =

Slovak airline

IATA	ICAO	Call sign
6G	RLX	RELAX
- Founded: 14 February 2013
- Operating bases: Bratislava Airport
- Fleet size: 3
- Headquarters: Bratislava, Slovakia
- Key people: Daniel Ferjanček (CEO)
- Employees: 200
- Website: go2sky.aero

Go2Sky is a Slovak ACMI specialist and charter airline headquartered in Bratislava and based at Bratislava Airport.

== History ==
Go2Sky was founded on 14 February 2013. The Slovak airline offered its aircraft for non-scheduled charter operations of passengers, cargo and mail. Furthermore, the airline offered lease ACMI (wet-lease) of their aircraft, designed for other airlines (AOC holder) and ad hoc charter flights. Go2Sky is IOSA (IATA Operational Safety Audit) certified since 2015.

For the summer season 2014, the airline had signed a wet lease contract with the Italian charter airline Mistral Air for two aircraft and Hamburg Airways for one airframe. In 2015, Go2Sky leased aircraft to Mistral Air, Ukraine International, Norwegian Air Shuttle, Royal Air Maroc and Arkia. In 2016, it leased aircraft to Czech Airlines, Mistral Air, Travel Service (airline), AlbaStar and Norwegian Air Shuttle. It also operated flights for Adria Airways with its Boeing 737-800 aircraft. Go2Sky secured spring and summer season 2019 wet-lease contracts for two Boeing 737-800s to Enter Air of Poland and one Boeing 737-800 to Corendon Airlines of Turkey.

On 19 August 2020, despite profits over the last two years, it was announced that Go2Sky would cease operations on 1 September 2020, due to the COVID-19 pandemic, whilst continuing to hold their AOC. However, later that year, it was decided that the airline would resume operations the following year and Go2Sky resumed operations in August 2021, operating for Corendon Airlines between Germany and various holiday destinations.

== Fleet ==
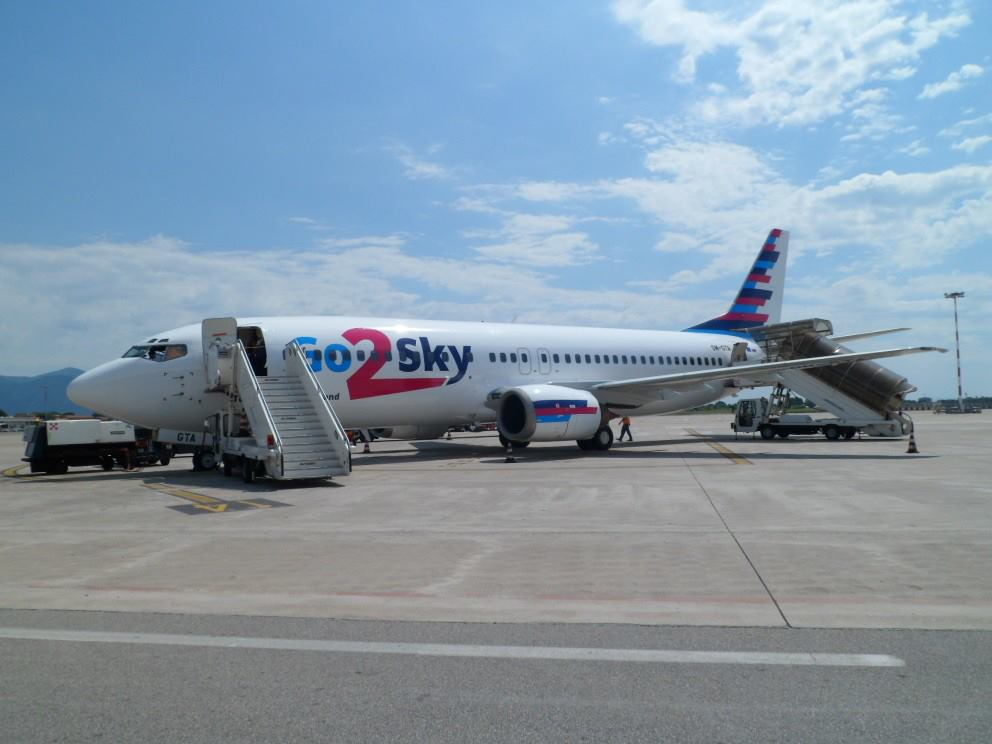
A former Go2Sky Boeing 737-400

As of August 2025, Go2Sky operates the following aircraft:

Go2Sky fleet
Aircraft	In service	Orders	Passengers	Notes
Boeing 737-800	3	—	189	
Total	3	—		

== Incidents and accidents ==
- On 4th November 2016, A Go2Sky Boeing 737-800 operated on behalf of Norwegian Air Shuttle, registration LN-NII performing flight DY-277 from Kristiansand to Oslo (Norway), entered Kristiansand's runway 04, began to accelerate for takeoff, the crew rejected takeoff at low speed and stopped the aircraft after about 230 meters due to a takeoff configuration warning. The crew mistakenly shut down both engines, which caused all electrics to shut down as well including cabin lighting. The aircraft remained in position for about 5 minutes and at this time the cabin crew walked the aisles to calm passengers. The flight attendants from Norwegian Air Shuttle expected another call by the cockpit crew to take their seats prior to takeoff, however, suddenly the engines accelerated for takeoff and the aircraft departed with the cabin crew rushing to their seats. The aircraft stopped the climb at FL150 (usual cruise level FL260) the crew received a cabin altitude warning and levelled off at low altitude, it was later found the air conditioning systems had not been activated.
- On 29th June 2025, a Go2Sky Boeing 737, registration OM-GTK, operated on behalf of TUI Airlines Nederland from Zakynthos to Amsterdam, suffered a stab trim failure, leading to the aircraft diverting to Athens. Notably the airline subsequently sued The Aviation Herald for coverage of this incident and, in an offered settlement, demanded that all coverage and comments relating to the incident on 4th November 2016 should be permanently deleted. As of August 30th, 2026, the editor of Aviation Herald was forced to sell his home to cover legal expenses incurred by the lawyers of Go2Sky that tried to force him to remove article regarding the incident.
