= EUjet =

Irish airline

IATA	ICAO	Call sign
VE	EUJ	UNION JET
- Founded: 2003
- Ceased operations: 27 July 2005
- Operating bases: Shannon Airport
- Hubs: Kent International Airport-Manston
- Focus cities: Manchester Airport
- Fleet size: 6
- Destinations: 21 in: United Kingdom; Ireland
- Headquarters: Shannon, Ireland
- Key people: P.J. McGoldrick (CEO); Stuart McGoldrick (Commercial director)
- Website: www.eujet.com (ceased)

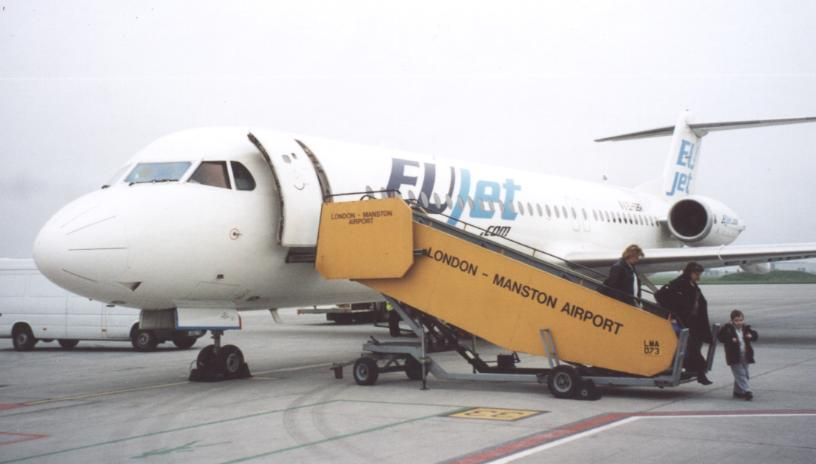
EUjet Fokker 100

EUjet was a low-cost airline based at Shannon Airport, Ireland. It operated a network of services from its main base at Shannon Airport (SNN), with a hub at Kent International Airport (MSE), Manston, Kent, UK. The airline was sold to a British company, PlaneStation, which also owned Kent airport, for €10m. In July 2005, PlaneStation went out of business with €40m in debts, forcing EUjet to cease operations.

== History ==
The airline was established in 2003, commencing operations in May of that year. It was created by former Trans Aer head PJ McGoldrick, who linked with Fokker 100 leasing specialist Debis AirFinance to offer wet leases and charters. In 2004, the company moved into scheduled services. Airport operator PlaneStation completed its takeover of EUjet in January 2005 by acquiring the remaining 70% of the shares. It had bought the first 30% in May 2004. On 26 July 2005, the airline went into administration.

== Services ==
EUjet operated the following services (at July 2005):

- Ireland domestic destinations: Dublin and Shannon.
- UK destinations: Belfast, Edinburgh, Manchester, Kent International Airport and Newcastle.
- International scheduled destinations: Alicante, Amsterdam, Faro, Geneva (ski seasonal destination), Girona, Ibiza, Innsbruck, Málaga, Murcia, Nice, Palma de Mallorca, Prague, Salzburg and Valencia.

== Fleet ==
The EuJet fleet consisted of the following aircraft:

EuJet Fleet
Aircraft	Total	Passengers
Fokker 100	6	108

== Collapse ==
On 25 July 2005, trading in PlaneStation (EUjet's parent company) shares was suspended. Passenger numbers were far down on expected figures and the company suffered a £6.5 million loss in the last half of 2004. The company stated that discussions with the banks have "not been positive".

On 26 July 2005, all flights were suspended along with the operations of Kent International Airport for all bar freight traffic. Later in the day, EUjet went into voluntary administration leaving up to 5,000 passengers stranded abroad and 500 jobs in the balance.

Lack of passenger numbers are one reason cited for the failure of the airline, with only 330,000 out of the 500,000 passengers predicted for the first year of operation. In addition, the airline had been affected by disruption and protest from people in Thanet, a significant proportion of whom were against any expansion of operations at Kent International Airport.

easyJet, a rival airline, offered to fly home the thousands of stranded EUjet customers for a flat fee of £25.
