= Avair =

Irish charter airline

IATA	ICAO	Call sign
KZ	–	–
- Founded: 1978
- Commenced operations: 13 January 1982
- Ceased operations: February 1984
- Operating bases: Cork Airport
- Fleet size: See Aircraft operated below
- Key people: Gerry Connolly (managing director)

Avair was an independent Irish airline that operated chartered business flights. It also operated a number of scheduled flights within Ireland, on routes such as Cork-Derry, Dublin-Sligo, Dublin-Waterford, Dublin-Cork and Dublin-Derry, availing of some government subsidies.

== History ==
Gerry Connolly was the founder and managing director of Avair Ltd. He set up the company in 1978 with investment from Crest Holdings and operated a twice-weekly service between Cork and Derry.

On 13 January 1982, Avair commenced a domestic commuter service between Cork Airport and Dublin. It also flew to Dublin twice weekly from Waterford Airport.

The airline was granted a number of international routes between Dublin and Blackpool, Nottingham, East Midlands and Leeds Bradford in the UK.

The airline closed in February 1984 after failing to get further government subsidies. Iona National Airways took over some of the routes such as Dublin-Sligo, and many of the internal Irish routes are now operated by Aer Lingus Regional.

== Fleet ==
- 1 x Beech King Air
- 1 x Beech King Air C90
- 2 x Short 330
