= TransAer International Airlines =

Irish airline

IATA	ICAO	Call sign
T8	TLA	TRANSLIFT
- Founded: October 1991
- Commenced operations: February 1992
- Ceased operations: 20 October 2000
- Operating bases: Dublin Airport
- Hubs: Dublin Airport; London Gatwick
- Parent company: Translift Holdings
- Headquarters: Dublin Airport, Dublin, Ireland
- Key people: Willie O'Byrne (CEO at the time of closure)

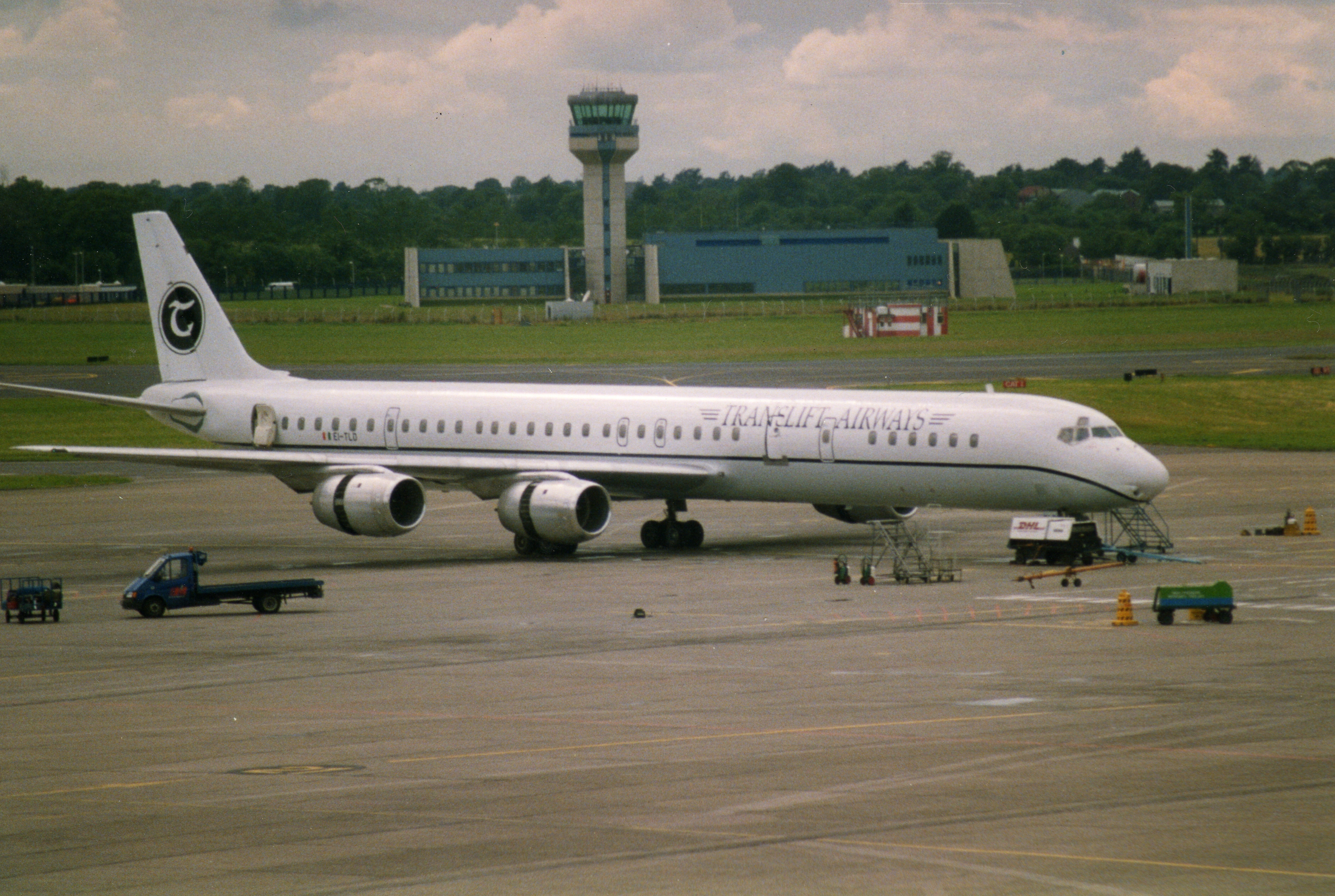
A Translift Airways Douglas DC-8 AT Dublin Airport in 1993

TransAer International Airlines was an Irish charter airline headquartered in the TransAer House, Dublin Airport, Dublin, Ireland.

== History ==
The airline was previously known as Translift Airways. It was established in October 1991 and started operations in February 1992. Renaming took place on 10 April 1997. It was the brainchild of P. J. McGoldrick (who later went on to run Ryanair and EUjet).

In 1997 it took over the assets of British airline All Leisure Airlines. This has been established on January 24, 1994, as Power Force Services but soon (March, 24) changed the corporate name. It was owned by All Leisure Travel Holdings which would become a shareholder of Transaer as well. All Leisure Airlines was based at Gatwick airport. Charter operations started in 1996 with leased Airbus A320 from the operational base, Manchester and Newcastle to Mediterranean destinations. All flights were halted in January 1997.

The airline operated a number of Airbus A300B4 and Airbus A320-200 aircraft. Some Boeing 727, Boeing 757 and Boeing 737-200 were also operated for a short period of time. The company leased aircraft to Libyan Arab Airlines and Khalifa Airways.

TransAer went into liquidation on 20 October 2000. Prior to the collapse, an 18-month contract was signed in 2000 to help set up a new airline in Kosovo. The collapse was blamed on the adverse effects of the Kosovo war, a failed $18 million investment in American airline TransMeridian and losses of $14 million incurred by TransAer's German and Greek charter airline business. The business failed with outstanding debts of £30 million and made 450 employees redundant.

Two of their aircraft were impounded in Ireland by Aer Rianta the day after the airline appointed a liquidator, due to TransAer's failure to pay landing and handling fees amounting to over £200,000.

== See also ==
- List of defunct airlines of the Ireland
