= Galway Airport =

Former airport of Galway, Ireland

Galway Airport Aerfort na Gaillimhe
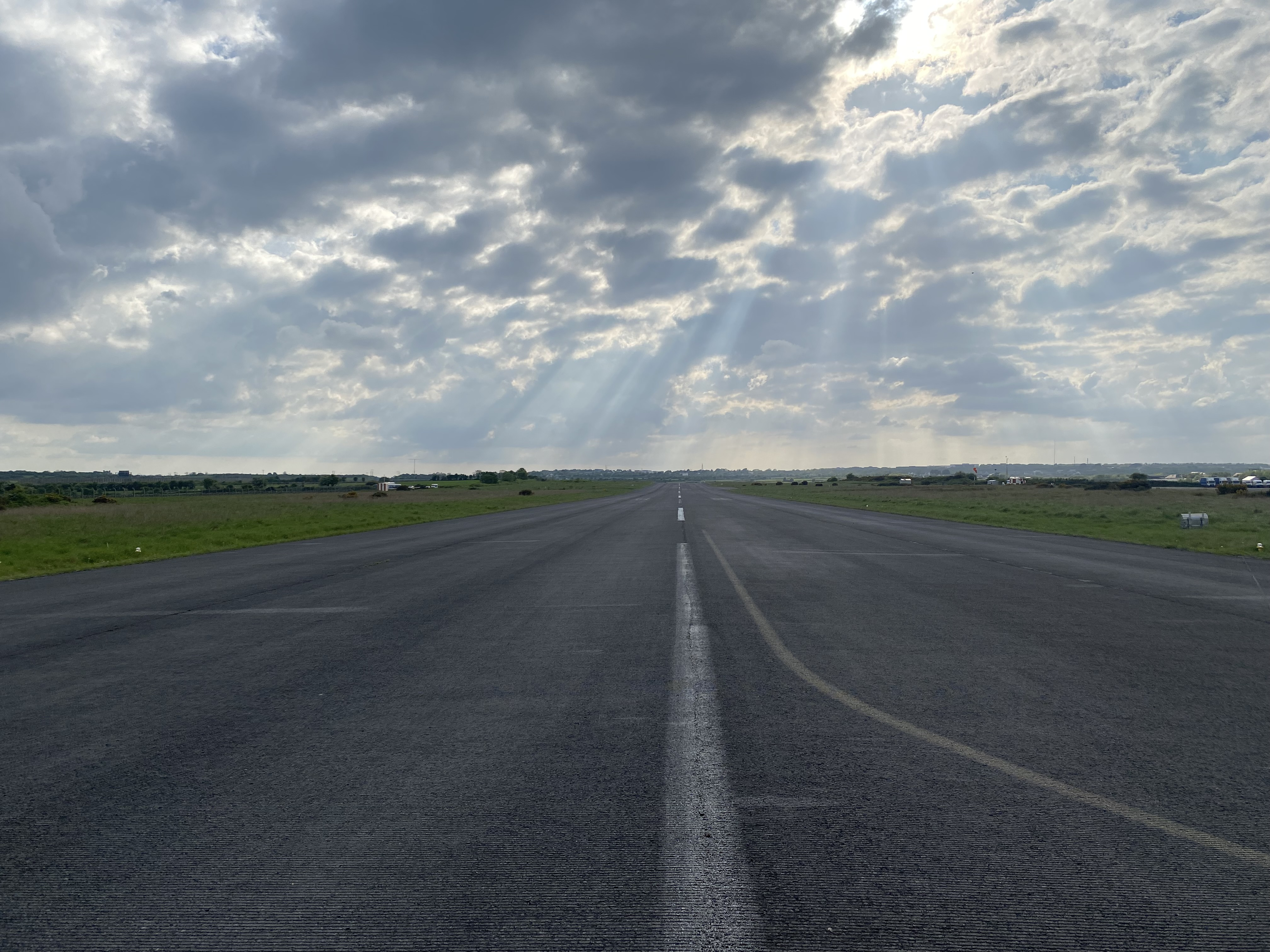
- Runway of Galway Airport
- IATA: GWY; ICAO: EICM

Summary
- Airport type: Public
- Owner: Galway County Council; Galway City Council
- Operator: Carnmore Aviation Ltd (last)
- Serves: Galway
- Location: Carnmore, County Galway
- Elevation AMSL: 25 m / 81 ft
- Coordinates: 53°18′01″N 008°56′28″W
- Website: www.galwayairport.com

Map
- Location of airport in Ireland

Runways
Direction	Length		Surface
Direction	m	ft	Surface
08/26	1,289	4,230	Asphalt
- Source: Irish AIS

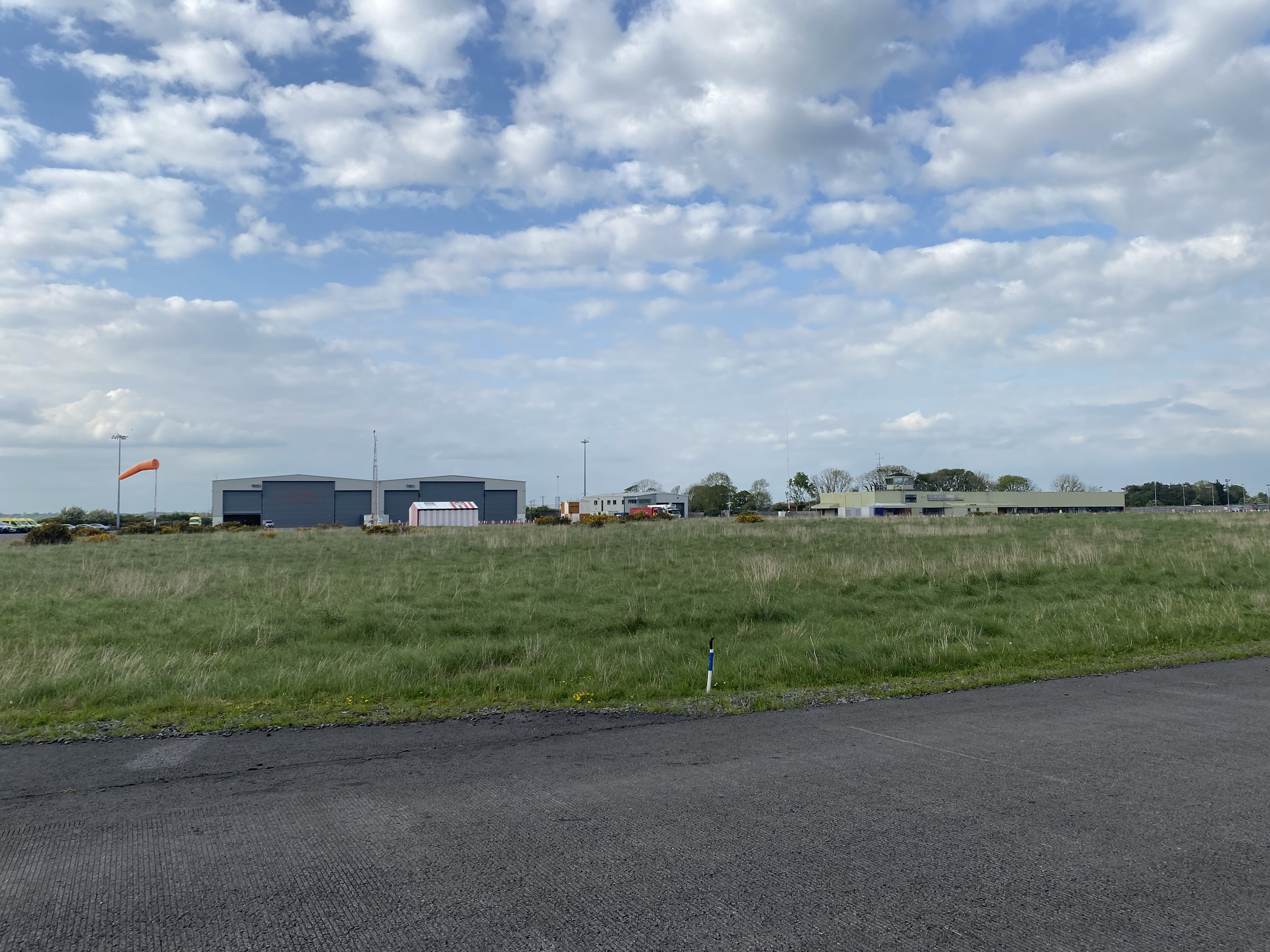
Buildings of Galway Airport

Galway Airport (IATA: GWY, ICAO: EICM) is an airport located at Carnmore, 4 NM (7.4 km; 4.6 mi) east of Galway City, County Galway, Ireland, managed by Corrib Airport Limited. Its last scheduled passenger traffic was on 31 October 2011, when Aer Arann ceased commercial operations at the airport. At 1289 m (4230 ft), the runway is too short to handle most jet airliners and so scheduled services were restricted to turboprop aircraft or small executive jets. At peak, the airport served over 300,000 passengers annually, with 16 destinations.

The airport briefly re-opened in 2015, but since then remains closed to commercial traffic, being used only by the Galway Flying Club.

In 2021, plans were announced to redevelop the site as a film studio, to launch in 2022 but as of 2023, these have not proceeded, and there have been discussions about future ownership options. The airport has been used as a site for concerts.

The nearest passengers airports are Ireland West Airport, located 82 km (51 mi) north and Shannon Airport, located 84 km (52 mi) south of Galway Airport.

== History ==
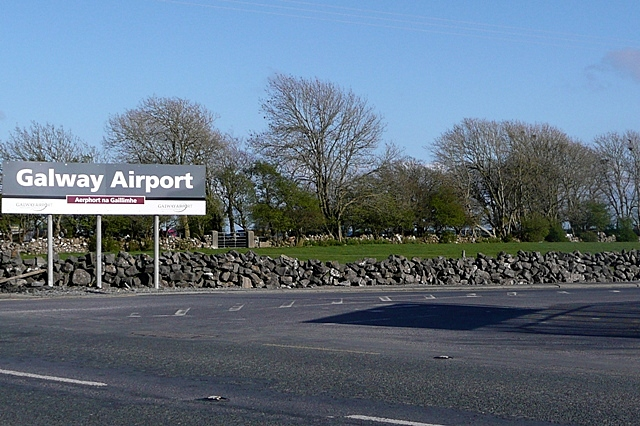
Galway Airport

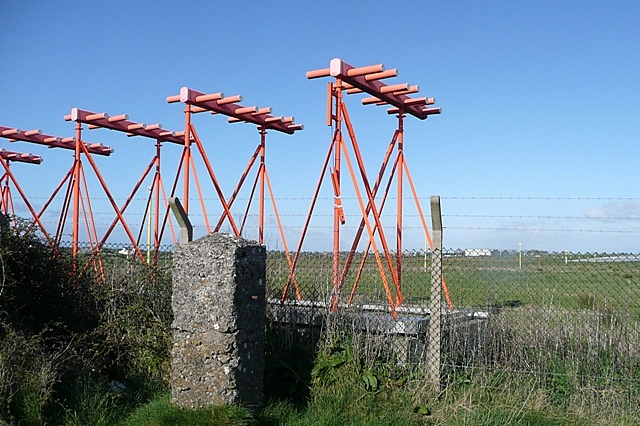
ILS localiser aerials at the western end of the runway.

In 1918, a landing ground was built for the Royal Flying Corps at nearby Oranmore. It was later used by Aer Arann, a local flying club and airline, and private operators. However, it remained a grass strip and was virtually unusable in winter. Ernest Steiner, a German businessman, built his own strip opposite his factory at Carnmore. Aer Arann moved in also and commenced operations from there in 1974.

The runway was extended to 1,200 metres and completed on 2 March 1987. Although it could accommodate larger aircraft it remained unsuitable for jet airliners and was entirely served by regional turboprop aircraft such as the French-Italian ATR-42. The first jet arrived at the airport on 30 March from Ohio, United States. It was a 12-seater Gulf-Stream II, and many more small business jets used the airport. A terminal and runway lighting project was completed by June of that year.

In January 1988, Aer Lingus re-introduced the Dublin route; in March Ryanair launched a new route to London Luton and later re-routed it to Stansted. The two airlines went into a business war, Ryanair offering cheap flights direct to London and Aer Lingus to Heathrow, Amsterdam, and Paris on selected days via Dublin. In 1991, due to business restructuring, Ryanair withdrew their London service and Aer Lingus were soon to follow.

In 1994, Aer Arann began the Dublin route supported by the state-funded public service obligation scheme. The route operated three times daily until state funding was withdrawn in 2011 and the airline ceased services on the route. In September 2001, they launched a service to London Luton and the load factor by 2003 was at 73%. The one-millionth passenger passed through the airport in April 2002. The airport was gaining in popularity and in 2003 Aer Arann launched two more routes to Manchester and Edinburgh with two further routes to Birmingham and Lorient launched in 2004.

By 2007, Galway was officially the fastest growing airport in Ireland, fast exceeding international airports with passenger growth at 63% per annum at that time. Sixteen destinations were served directly, Bristol, Cardiff, Cork, Dublin, Edinburgh, Leeds Bradford, London Luton, Lorient, Manchester, Newcastle, Belfast City, Birmingham, Southampton, Bordeaux, Faro and Málaga. That year saw a record of 309,000 passengers use the airport. The two millionth passenger also passed through in that year.

On 21 February 2007, the Government of Ireland announced that it was providing €6.3 million in capital grant money for Galway Airport. In 2008, this allocation was reduced by 50–60% as a result of national budget cutbacks. Aer Arann added a service to Amsterdam in 2008 which operated via Waterford Airport but was discontinued after a short period.

After 2008, numbers and routes dropped considerably with only Aer Arann routes to Luton, Lorient (seasonal), Manchester and Edinburgh remaining. In 2010, Manx2 added two services – Belfast International and Cork; these services were withdrawn in 2011. In March 2011, Aer Arann launched twice-daily flights to Southend Airport. An additional "Development Fee" of €10 was charged to all departing passengers aged 12 years and over.

In June 2011, the Irish government announced that funding for Galway Airport would cease by December 2011. The government stated that the decision was taken to focus on the four other regional airports, which would receive state funding for 2012. On 12 October 2011, Aer Arann announced that it was to suspend its services from Galway for the winter season, commencing on 31 October. This meant that there were no scheduled services from Galway. Airport management stated that the airport would remain open. Galway was the second Irish airport after Sligo Airport to have its scheduled services suspended in 2011. In February 2012, workers at the airport staged a sit-in to protest against the risk that their redundancy payments might not materialise after the airport's bankers had seized its working capital.

In 2013, the two local authorities, Galway City Council and Galway County Council, took control of the airport. In November 2013, it was announced that the airport's aviation licence would cease, effectively closing the facility.

In January 2015, Galway Airport briefly reopened to commercial flights. The airport was being operated under licence from Galway County Council until May 2015 by Carnmore Aviation Ltd., a company owned by the Conneely Group in Ballinasloe. The Group also owns Weston Airport near Dublin, and the staff was shared between the airports. "It is only a small step but great to have commercial aviation back at Galway Airport." The airport closed for commercial traffic in 2016, and thereafter was only used by a local flying club.

During the COVID-19 pandemic the Irish Health Authorities used the Airport buildings as one of the venues for their public COVID-19 testing programme.

In 2021, plans were announced to redevelop the site as a studio for film and TV production, to launch in 2022 but as of 2023, these have not proceeded, in part, apparently, due to the limited duration of the planning permission granted. There have been discussions at Galway City and County Councils about future ownership options.

== General aviation ==
Galway Flying Club has used the airport for fixed-wing training and leisure flying.

== Statistics ==
Passenger numbers through Galway airport. The airport ceased commercial traffic during 2011, and as of November 2019 doesn't have any scheduled flights.

Year	Passengers
2001	90,000
2002	106,000
2003	138,000
2004	230,106
2005	252,897
2006	248,972
2007	309,302
2008	266,897
2009	194,158
2010	154,814
2011	67,002

When the airport was fully operational, these were the busiest routes from Galway. All these services ceased in 2011.

Rank	Origin	2009	2010	2011	% Change 2010/11	Carrier
1	London Luton Airport, England, United Kingdom	69,299	58,464	36,803†	▼41	Aer Arann
2	Manchester Airport, England, United Kingdom	39,393	25,025	18,370	▼31	Aer Arann
3	Edinburgh Airport, Scotland, United Kingdom	19,676	16,640	11,614	▼34	Aer Arann
4	Lorient South Brittany Airport, France	2,232	2,325	465	▼80	Aer Arann

†Service shared between London Luton and London Southend in 2011

== Ground transportation ==
The airport is located 6 km (3.7 mi) by road from Galway city centre. There are no public transport services.
