= Enter Air =

Polish charter airline

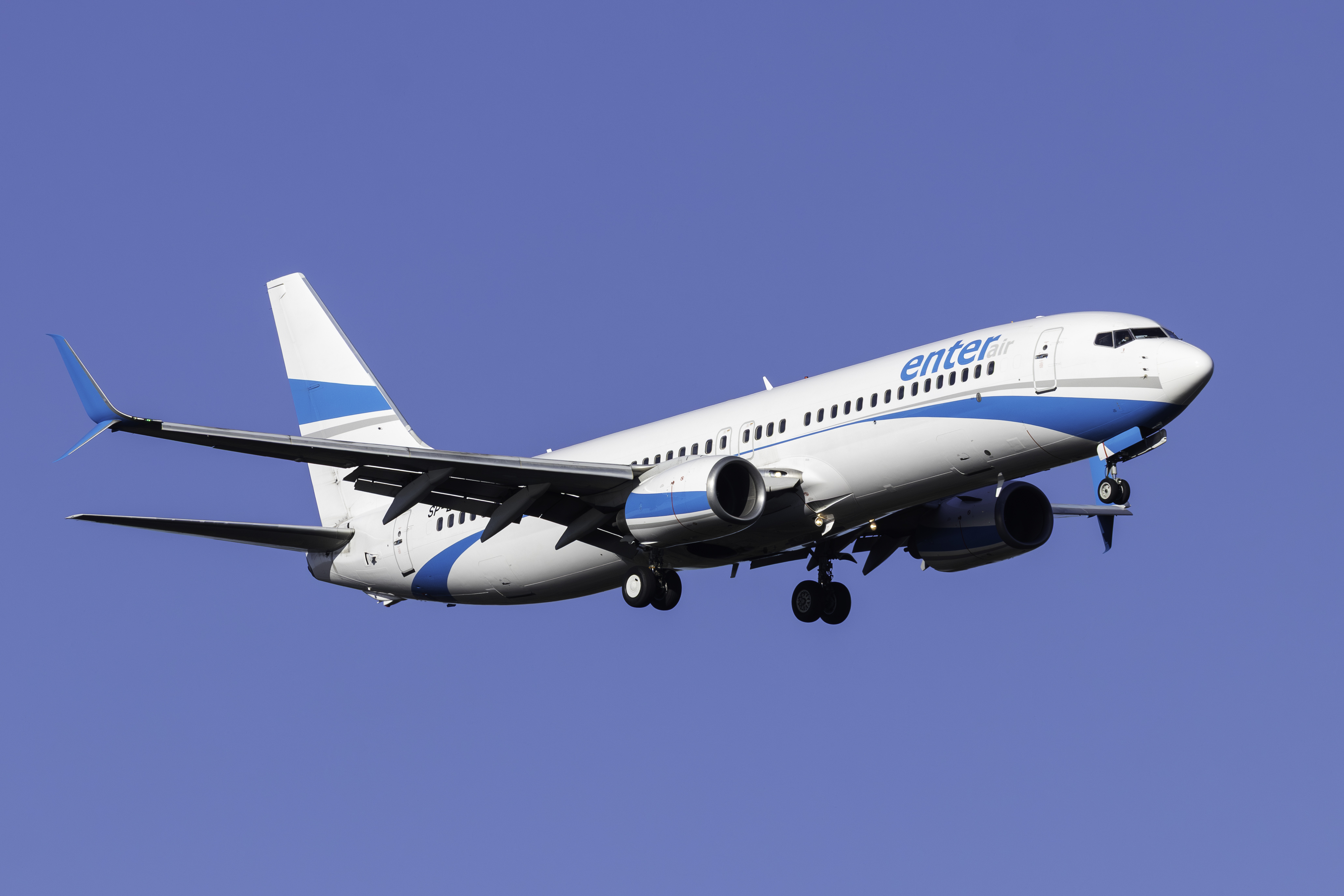
- Enter Air Boeing 737-800
IATA	ICAO	Call sign
E4	ENT	ENTERAIR
- Founded: 15 October 2009; 17 years ago
- Commenced operations: 25 April 2010; 16 years ago
- Operating bases: Katowice; Poznań; Gdańsk; Warsaw–Chopin; Wrocław
- Subsidiaries: Fly4 Airlines (51%); Chair Airlines (49%)
- Fleet size: 36
- Destinations: 10 regular / 74 (charter / seasonal)
- Headquarters: Warsaw, Poland
- Key people: Grzegorz Polaniecki (President)
- Founders: Marcin Kubrak and Grzegorz Polaniecki
- Website: www.enterair.pl

Enter Air S.A. is a Polish charter airline with its head office in Warsaw, Poland, and main base at Warsaw Chopin Airport and Katowice Airport. It operates holiday and charter flights out of its hubs in Poznań, Katowice, Gdańsk, Warsaw and Wrocław.

== History ==
On 25 April 2010, Enter Air completed its inaugural flight from Warsaw to Enfidha. The airline cooperates with major tour operators in Poland (including Rainbow Tours, TUI, Wezyr, and Itaka) and operates mainly from Poland to popular holiday destinations such as: Portugal, Spain, Turkey, Greece, Italy, Bulgaria, Croatia, Egypt, and Tunisia. Its low-cost model helped it grow over 300% between 2010 and 2012, despite the rising fuel prices and the events in Tunisia and Egypt (Q1 2011), which made some airlines reduce their fleet or even disappear from the market.

Enter Air Group is listed on the Warsaw Stock Exchange since its IPO on 14 December 2015. The company shares are traded with a ticker symbol ENT.

== Fleet ==
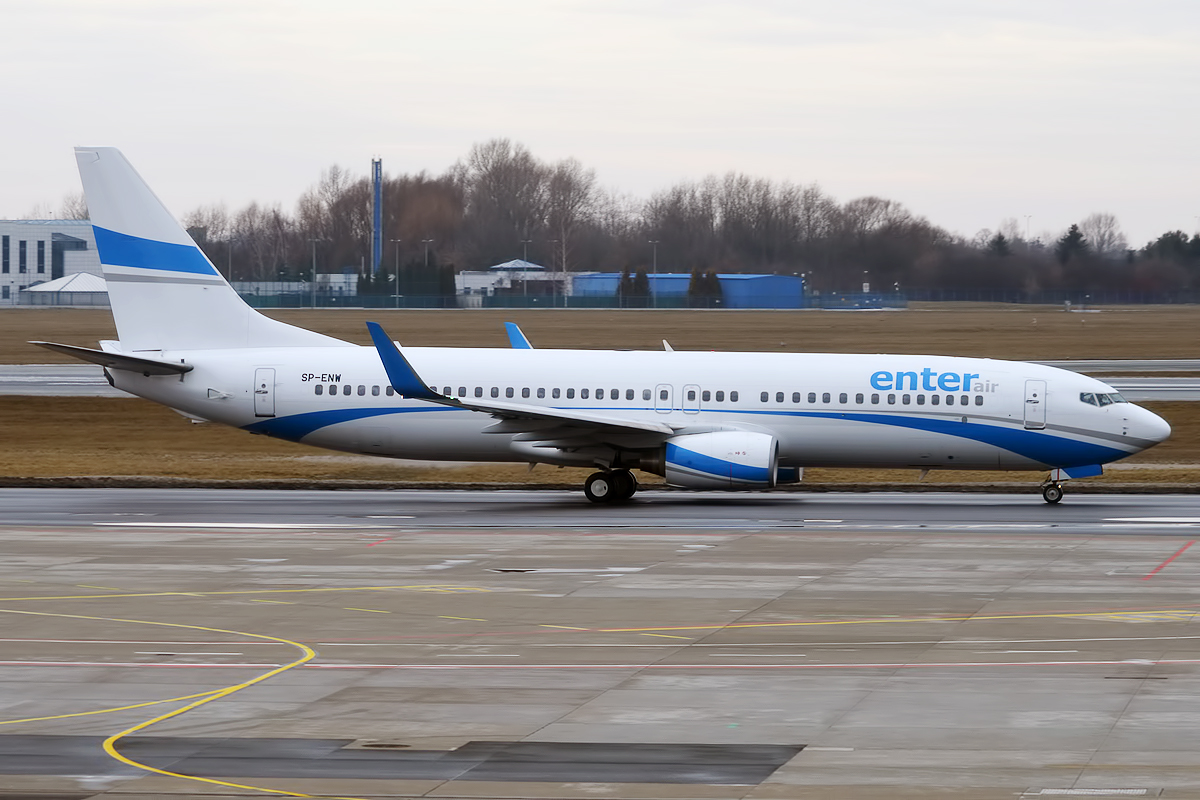
Enter Air Boeing 737-800

As of September 2025, Enter Air operates the following aircraft:

Enter Air fleet
Aircraft	In service	Orders	Passengers	Notes
Boeing 737-800	26	—	189	
Boeing 737 MAX 8	10	5	189	
Total	36	5		

Enter Air also operated 6 Airbus A320-200 aircraft in 2014, 2017, 2019, 2022-2023.
