= Stobart Air =

Irish regional airline

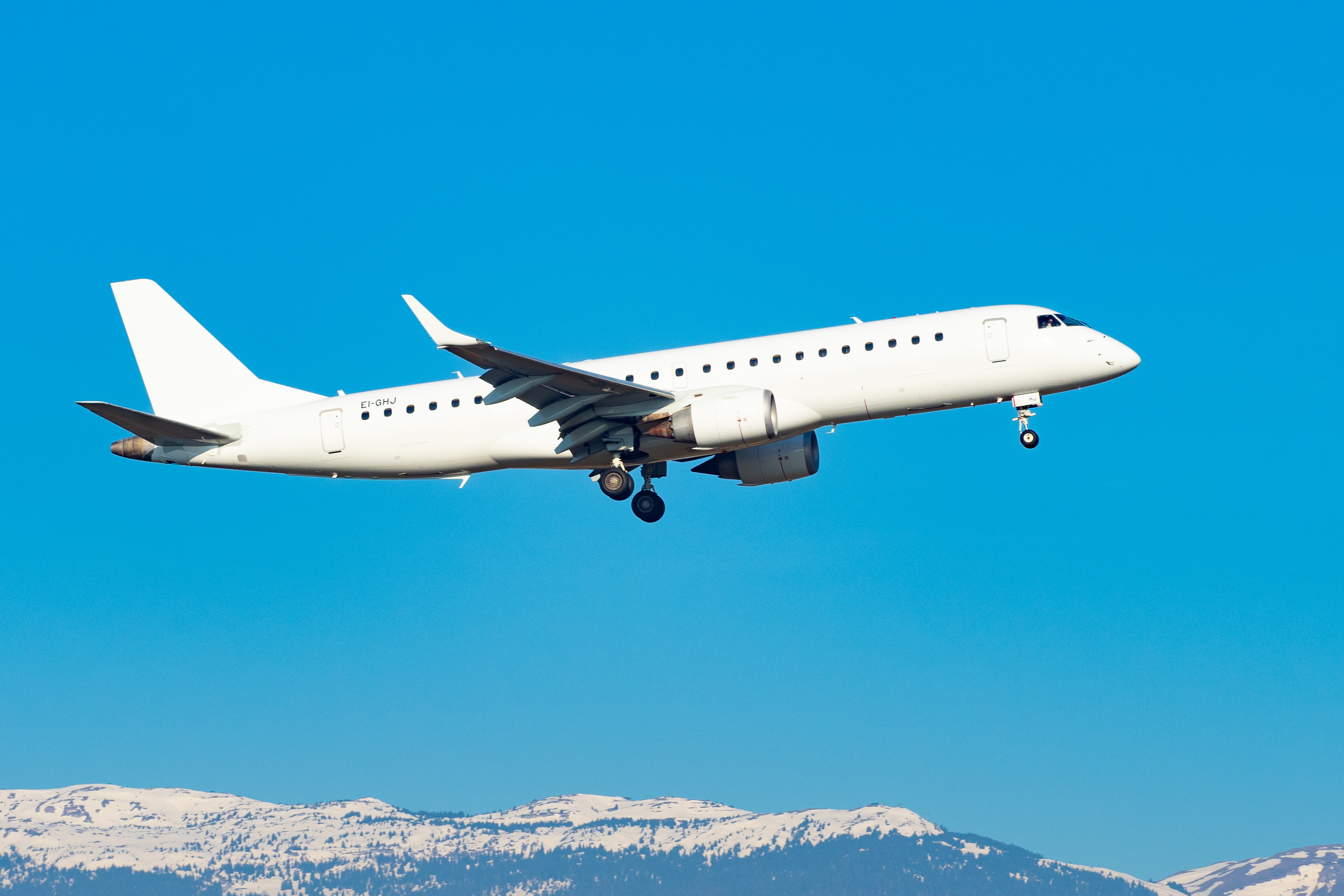
- Embraer ERJ-190AR
IATA	ICAO	Call sign
RE	STK	STOBART
- Founded: 1970 (as Aer Arann); 19 March 2014 (as Stobart Air)
- Ceased operations: 12 June 2021
- Operating bases: Belfast–City Airport; Cork Airport; Dublin Airport
- Fleet size: 13
- Destinations: 20
- Parent company: Ettyl Limited
- Headquarters: Dublin, Ireland
- Key people: Andy Jolly, Managing Director
- Employees: 570
- Website: www.stobartair.com

Stobart Air was an Irish regional airline based in Dublin, that began operations in 1970 and ceased in 2021. It operated scheduled services under the brands Aer Lingus Regional, BA CityFlyer and KLM Cityhopper on behalf of their respective owners. Stobart Air had operating bases in Cork, Dublin and Belfast for Aer Lingus Regional.

The airline originated as Aer Arann, providing services from Galway to the Aran Islands in 1970, and the 1990s grew into a regional airline, with Aer Arann Regional based in Dublin. A major refinancing in 2014 was associated with a name change to Stobart Air.

Stobart Air was closed and began liquidation in June 2021.

== History ==
Aer Arann was established in 1970 by James Coen and Ralph Langan to provide an island-hopping air service between Galway and the Aran Islands off the west coast of Ireland. Operations, using a single Britten-Norman Islander, began in August 1970. This service has since been moved to the less distant Connemara Airport and operates as Aer Arann Islands. As of 2026, it still uses Islander aircraft.

The turning point for the airline was in 1994 when Pádraig Ó Céidigh and Eugene O'Kelly purchased the airline. Ó Céidigh and O'Kelly began to expand the airline's routes and fleet, launching scheduled services in 1998. Also in 1998, the Irish government awarded the airline the Public service obligation (PSO) route between Donegal Airport and Dublin Airport, followed by the PSO route between Sligo Airport and Dublin.

In 2002, service to the United Kingdom and Jersey was introduced, followed by service to Lorient and Nantes in Brittany in 2004.

In 2007, Aer Arann had a turnover of €100 million and passenger numbers in excess of 1.15 million.

In 2008, in recognition of the company's marketing achievements, the Head of Sales and Marketing, Colin Lewis, was awarded the All Ireland Marketing Leader of the Year Award by the Marketing Institute of Ireland.

In 2008, Aer Arann entered into a franchise agreement with Nex Aviation and introduced service to Amsterdam, Bordeaux, Málaga and Faro, using British Aerospace 146 aircraft during the summer months. The Amsterdam service, which was operated by an ATR 72-500, ended on 14 January 2009.

In October 2008, the airline announced that it would be implementing a cost-saving programme, due to the downturn in passenger traffic, which would involve some focus on charter flights and leasing of aircraft and their crews to other airlines. The airline stated that up to 100 redundancies would be needed, but this was later revised to 70, which would represent a 20% reduction of staff. The airline's key routes were to remain unchanged.

In January 2010, Aer Arann and Aer Lingus founded Aer Lingus Regional, which effectively removed Aer Arann's hubs at Cork and Dublin under the new airline.

In July 2010, Aer Arann confirmed it would end flights between Cork-Belfast and Cork-Dublin from 31 August 2010. The company's press release stated, "we sincerely regret having to suspend these services and the inconvenience that it will cause our loyal customers on both routes. Unfortunately, however, we have an aircraft leaving the fleet and this has an obvious but regrettable impact on our schedule. Aer Arann had operated flights on the Cork to Dublin route since 2001 and began service from Cork to Belfast in March 2004 after the demise of the airline JetMagic. Aer Arann now no longer operates from Cork Airport in its own entity but continues to expand its presence at Cork under the Aer Lingus Regional brand.

On 26 August 2010, an examiner was appointed to Aer Arann. A full hearing of the company's application took place on 8 September, and Aer Arann was in interim examinership under the protection of the Court. All Aer Arann flights continued to operate normally. It was understood by the High Court in Dublin that Aer Arann would return to profitability in 2011.

In October 2010, British logistics company Stobart Group was named as the preferred buyer for the airline, also announcing that the airline would serve London Southend Airport from March 2011 to destinations in Ireland and possibly France and open a base there.

On 10 November 2010, the deal was completed. Aer Arann is now owned by Everdeal Limited, which at the time became 67.5% owned by Pádraig Ó Céidigh, Aer Arann's Chairman; 27.5% owned by Tim Kilroe, a UK-based businessman; and 5% owned by the Stobart Group, through 35 preference shares of €1 each acquired on 10 November 2010. Stobart Group entered into an option to increase its shareholding by a further 27.5% to 32.5%.

On 7 April 2011, Aer Arann confirmed it would end its PSO (Public Service Obligation) routes after the Irish Government withdrew funding for the routes, which included Dublin to Galway, Knock and Sligo.

In October 2011, Aer Arann announced it would suspend all services from Galway Airport, axed routes including Galway to Edinburgh, London-Luton, London-Southend, Manchester and Lorient. The company said the routes were "financially no longer viable". Galway Airport then confirmed it would have to make redundant 40 staff due to losing the airport's only operator.

On 8 February 2012, Aer Arann's Chief Executive, Paul Schutz resigned and was replaced by Sean Brogan, the head of Stobart Ireland. This gave Stobart Group management control of the airline, and prompted speculation that it would exercise its option to increase its 5% stake in Everdeal Limited by a further 27.5% to 32.5%.

On 2 March 2012, it was confirmed that Aer Arann was in final discussions to transfer all of its own operated flights to the Aer Lingus Regional brand. This would mean Aer Arann would operate on behalf of Aer Lingus Regional, with the airline no longer operating routes as its entity.

On 14 March 2012, Aer Arann confirmed it would no longer exist in its own entity from 10 April 2012. All its services transferred to Aer Lingus Regional on 25 March, streamlining services to a single brand, with the one remaining route operated on an RE flight number, London City to Isle of Man, ceasing on 10 April.

On 6 November 2012, Aer Arann announced it was pulling out of Waterford, as its services had not performed to a "sustainable level". However, it did not rule out returning to Waterford in the future, "if the business case can be justified".

On 12 December 2012, Stobart Group exercised its option to increase its 5% shareholding in Everdeal Limited by 27.5% to 32.5%, and acquired a further 12.5% of the company, taking its stake to 45%. This diluted Chairman Pádraig Ó Céidigh's shareholding to 47.5% and Tim Kilroe's shareholding to 7.5%.

On 25 January 2013, Aer Arann's Chairman Pádraig Ó Céidigh resigned. Stobart Group was therefore expected to buy its 47.5% shareholding in Everdeal Limited by the beginning of February 2013. This would have enabled it to have a 92.5% controlling stake in the airline.

On 30 April 2013, Aer Arann's ownership was restructured, under the ownership of Everdeal Holdings Limited, which is in turn 45% owned by the Stobart Group; 42% owned by Invesco; 8% owned by Cenkos Securities; and 5% owned by Pádraig Ó Céidigh, Aer Arann's former Chairman. Stobart Group had an option to acquire complete control of the airline by increasing its shareholding by a further 55% to 100%.

=== Stobart Air ===
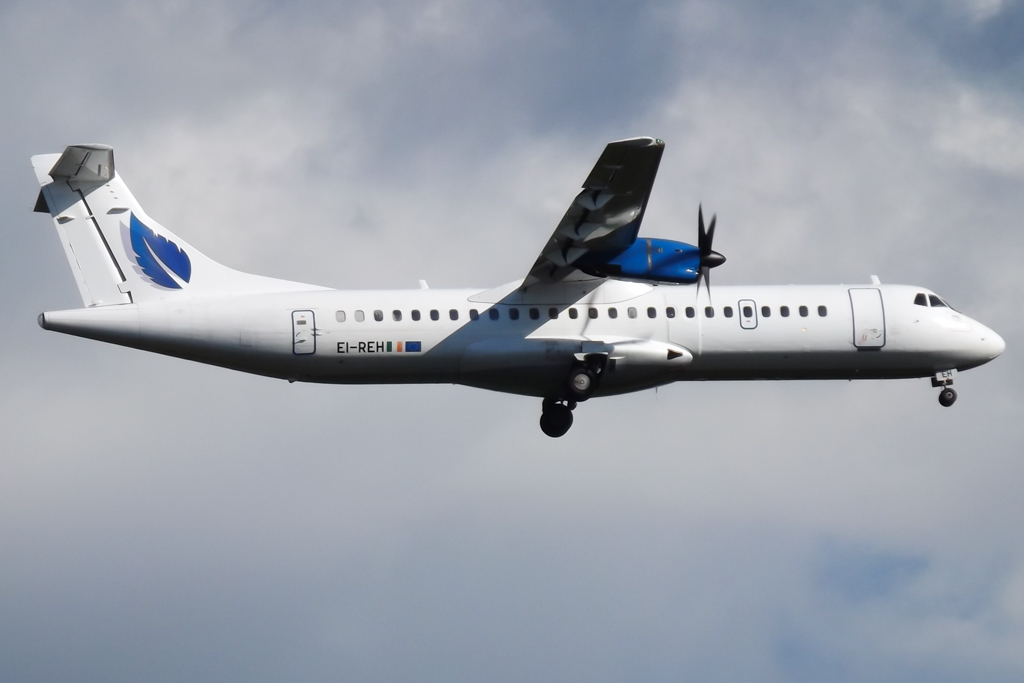
An ATR 72-200

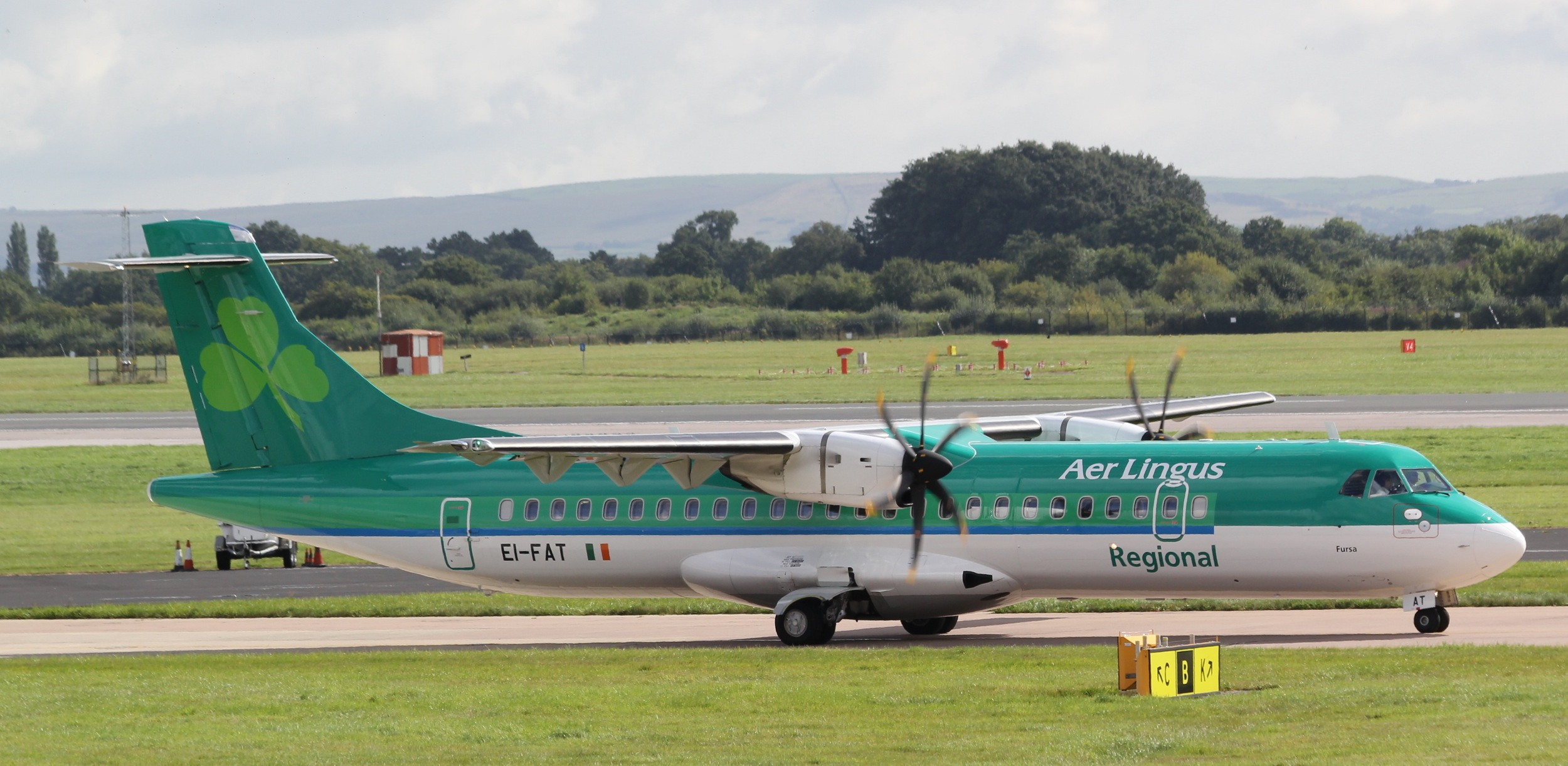
An ATR 72-600 operated by Stobart Air on Aer Lingus Regional behalf

On 19 March 2014, Aer Arann announced that it would be changing its corporate name to Stobart Air by the end of 2014. Stobart Air was owned by Everdeal Holdings Limited, which was 81% owned by the Stobart Group, 10% by Cenkos Securities, and 10% by Pádraig Ó Céidigh, Aer Arann's former Chairman. Stobart Group had an option to acquire complete control of the airline by increasing its shareholding to 100%.

Stobart Air announced on 25 March 2014, it was diversifying away from operating exclusively for Aer Lingus by enacting a five-year agreement with Flybe to operate six routes in Northern Europe and Benelux from 5 June 2014. It was further announced in November 2014 that Stobart Air was also to operate two routes from Cardiff to Edinburgh and Paris-Orly, on behalf of CityJet, from 1 December 2014.

On 24 February 2017, Stobart Group completed a 100% acquisition of Stobart Air, after purchasing the remaining 19% of Everdeal Holdings. Stobart Group also completed 100% ownership of Propius Holdings Ltd, the aircraft leasing firm through which many of the Stobart Air aircraft are sourced.

As of April 2018, Stobart Air wet leased two E195s from Flybe. From the second half of 2018, Stobart Air's leasing firm, Propius acquired three E195s from leasing firm GOAL. These aircraft were leased to Flybe until the end of 2018.

On 11 January 2019, Stobart Aviation and Virgin Atlantic formed the Connect Airways consortium to make a takeover bid for Flybe. The consortium was also to take over Stobart Air, with the aim of creating an integrated carrier operating under a Virgin brand. Stobart Air's wet lease operations for other airlines would continue unchanged. On 15 January 2019, Connect Airways announced an increased offer, which Flybe's board accepted. The deal was completed on 21 February 2019, despite a last-minute rival bid.

On 5 February 2019, it was announced that Stobart Air would wetlease one of its E195s to KLM Cityhopper to operate four flights daily between Amsterdam and Geneva and four between Amsterdam and Dublin. The flights were executed between 25 February and 30 March.

On 5 March 2020, Flybe entered administration due to ongoing difficulties compounded by the coronavirus pandemic; all Flybe flights operated by Flybe itself and by Stobart Air ceased. On 18 March 2020, Connect Airways in turn entered administration. On 23 March 2020, Stobart Air which operated under the Aer Lingus Regional brand announced it would suspend all international flights due to the COVID-19 pandemic. However its public service obligation (PSO) flights from Dublin Airport to Donegal Airport and Kerry Airport would continue. Stobart Air itself did not go into administration, and in mid-April Stobart Group announced that it was "reviewing all options" with the administrators, including the possibility of buying back Stobart Air and its sister company Propius Leasing, believing that the two companies have a viable future after the pandemic.

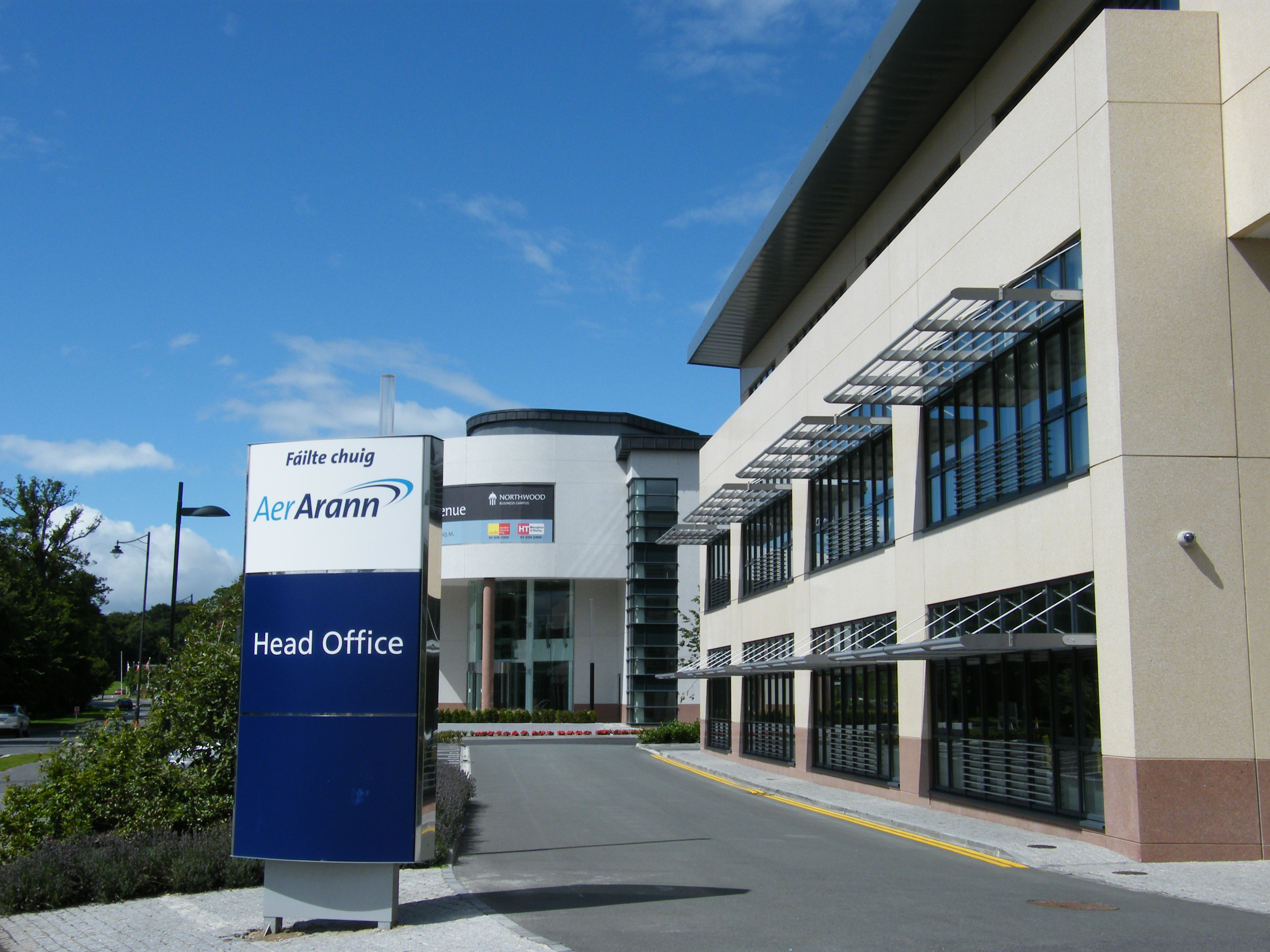
Headquarters in Dublin

On 27 April 2020, Stobart Group bought back Stobart Air and Propius Leasing from the Connect Airways bankruptcy administrators. Stobart Group initially paid €344,000 to Connect Airways administrators EY, the deal is set to be worth over €9.45m. Stobart Air was also in talks with Aer Lingus to extend its franchise agreement beyond 2022.

Following a competitive tender process, in November 2020 it was announced that Stobart Air had not been successful in retaining the Aer Lingus Regional franchise. A new operator was to take over from January 2023, will take over with Emerald Airlines as the preferred option.

In April 2021, Isle of Man-based company Ettyl reached an agreement to buy Stobart Air. At the end of May, it emerged that Ettyl's intended financing had not materialised, postponing completion of the deal.

On 11 June 2021, Stobart Air informed Aer Lingus it was terminating its franchise agreement as the company was to be placed into liquidation, resulting in the cancellation of all Aer Lingus Regional flights.

== Destinations ==
=== Aer Lingus Regional ===
Destinations flown by Aer Arann before 2012 then onwards operating for Aer Lingus Regional.

Country	City	Airport	Remarks	Refs
England	Blackpool	Blackpool Airport	Airport Closed	
England	Birmingham	Birmingham Airport		
England	Bournemouth	Bournemouth Airport	Terminated	
England	Bristol	Bristol Airport		
England	Doncaster	Doncaster Sheffield Airport	Airport Closed	
England	East Midlands	East Midlands Airport		
England	Exeter	Exeter Airport		
England	Leeds/Bradford	Leeds Bradford Airport		
England	London	Luton Airport	Terminated	
England	London	London Southend Airport	Terminated	
England	Manchester	Manchester Airport		
England	Newcastle Upon Tyne	Newcastle Airport		
England	Newquay	Newquay Airport		
England	Sheffield	Sheffield City Airport	Airport Closed	
England	Southampton	Southampton Airport	Terminated	
England	Teesside	Teesside Int’l Airport	Terminated	
France	Bordeaux	Bordeaux Airport	Terminated	
France	Brest	Brest Airport	Terminated	
France	La Rochelle	La Rochelle Airport	Terminated	
France	Lorient	Lorient Airport	Terminated	
France	Nantes	Nantes Airport	Terminated	
France	Rennes	Rennes–Saint-Jacques Airport	Seasonal	
Ireland	Cork	Cork Airport	Base	
Ireland	Donegal	Donegal Airport		
Ireland	Dublin	Dublin Airport	Base	
Ireland	Galway	Galway Airport	Terminated	
Ireland	Kerry	Kerry Airport		
Ireland	Shannon	Shannon Airport		
Ireland	Waterford	Waterford Airport	Terminated	
Isle of Man	Isle of Man	Isle of Man Airport		
Jersey	Jersey	Jersey Airport	Seasonal	
Netherlands	Amsterdam	Amsterdam Airport	Terminated	
Northern Ireland	Belfast	George Best Belfast City Airport	Base	
Northern Ireland	Derry	Derry Airport	Terminated	
Portugal	Faro	Faro Airport	Terminated	
Spain	Málaga	Málaga Airport	Terminated	
Scotland	Aberdeen	Aberdeen Airport		
Scotland	Edinburgh	Edinburgh Airport		
Scotland	Glasgow	Glasgow Int’l Airport		
Scotland	Glasgow	Glasgow Prestwick Airport	Terminated	
Scotland	Inverness	Inverness Airport	Terminated	
Wales	Cardiff	Cardiff Airport	(was to begin 28 June 2021)	

=== Operated as Flybe ===
The following routes were operated by Stobart Air for Flybe before it entered administration on 5 March 2020.

Country	City	Airport	Notes
France	Caen	Caen – Carpiquet Airport	
France	Rennes	Rennes–Saint-Jacques Airport	
Isle of Man	Isle of Man	Isle of Man Airport	Base
Netherlands	Groningen	Groningen Airport Eelde	
United Kingdom	Belfast	George Best Belfast City Airport	
United Kingdom	Birmingham	Birmingham Airport	
United Kingdom	Edinburgh	Edinburgh Airport	
United Kingdom	Exeter	Exeter Airport	
United Kingdom	Liverpool	Liverpool Airport	
United Kingdom	London	London City Airport	Base
United Kingdom	London	London Southend Airport	Base
United Kingdom	Manchester	Manchester Airport	
United Kingdom	Newquay	Newquay Airport	

== Fleet ==
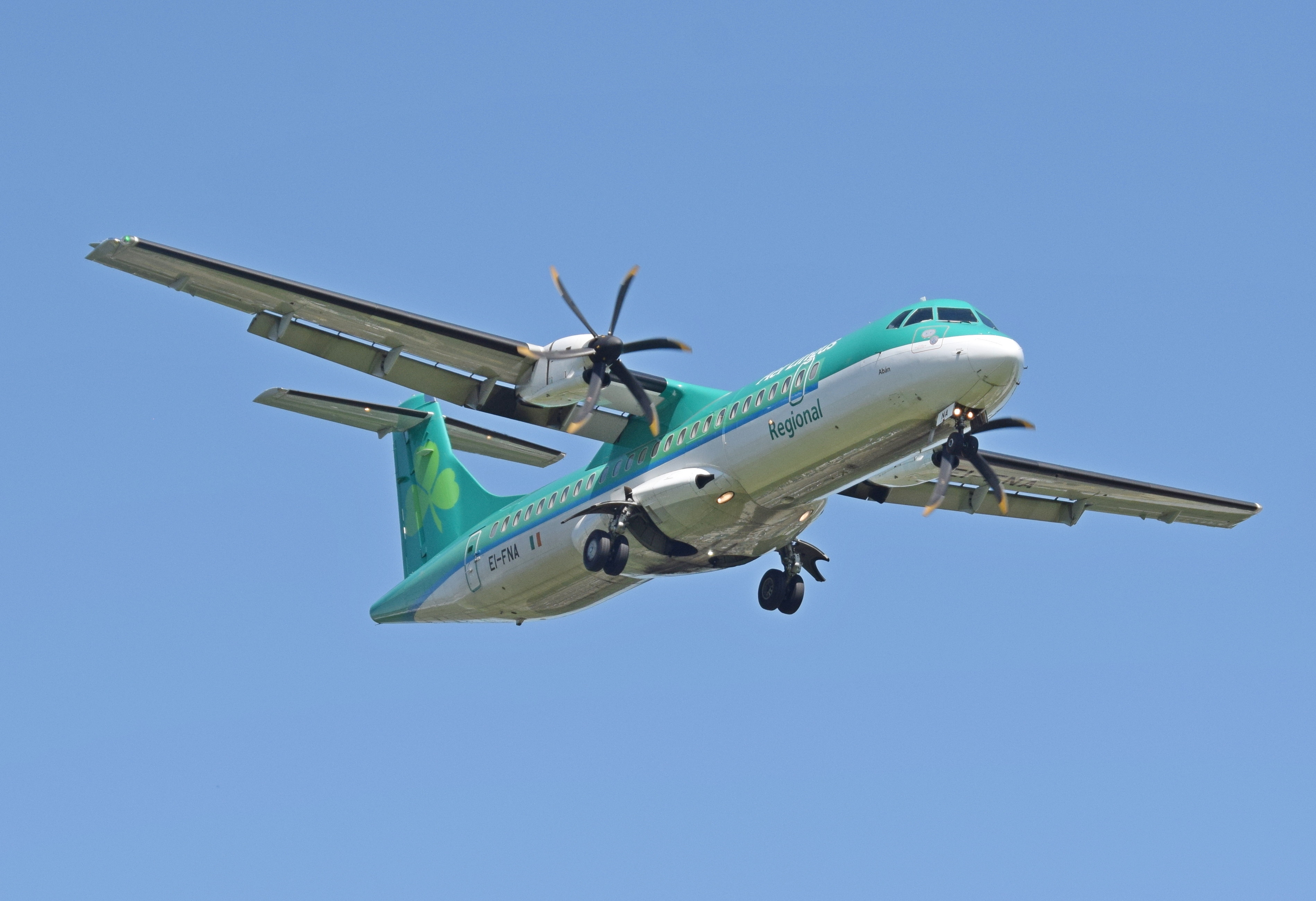
An ATR 72-600 of Aer Lingus Regional, operated by Stobart Air

=== Final fleet ===
The Stobart Air fleet consisted of the following aircraft as of June 2021, prior to the shutdown of operations:

Aircraft type	In service	Orders	Passengers	Remarks
ATR 42-600	1	—	48	Operated for Aer Lingus Regional.
ATR 72-600	12	—	72	All operated for Aer Lingus Regional.
Total	13	—		

=== Previous fleet ===
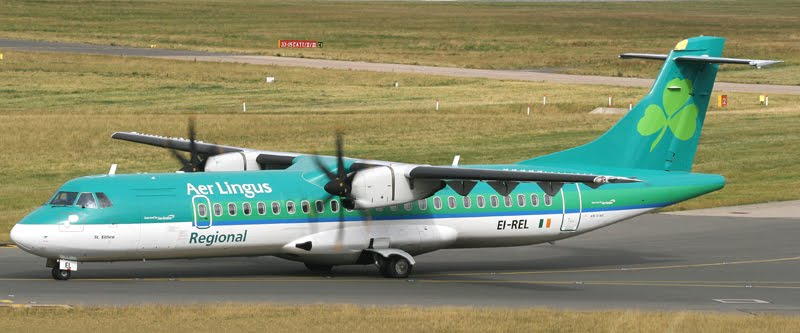
An ATR 72 in Aer Lingus Regional colours taxiing at Birmingham Airport, England

The Aer Arann fleet which exclusively operated for Aer Lingus Regional included the following aircraft:

Aer Arann fleet operating for Aer Lingus Regional
Aircraft	Total	Orders	Passengers	Notes
ATR 42-300	3	—	48	One stored.
ATR 72-201	2	—	66	
ATR 72-500	2	—	72	
ATR 72-600	7	—	72	
Total	14	—		

Stobart Air also operated the following aircraft types (in alphabetical order):

- BAe 146-200 - wet leased from Nex Aviation and Cityjet in summer 2008
- Embraer 190 - leased from NAC, operated for BA Cityflyer and KLM Cityhopper, returned to lessor in February 2021
- Embraer 195 - leased from in-house leasing arm Propius Ltd. Operated for Flybe.
- Fokker 50
- Piper PA-31 Navajo
- Short 360 - 1998-2001

== Sponsorship deals ==
Aer Arann was the main shirt sponsor of the Galway Gaelic Football team, and had its logo on the back of the Connacht Rugby team shirts, as well as sponsoring the Munster Rugby team. On 17 December 2010, Aer Arann announced that it would be ending its sponsorship of the Galway Gaelic Football team.

== Accidents and incidents ==
- On 4 February 2001, Short 360-100 registration EI-BPD, carrying 25 passengers and 3 crew, was damaged beyond repair following a hard landing at Sheffield City Airport after a scheduled Aer Arann Express passenger flight from Dublin. There were no injuries.
- On 17 July 2011, ATR 72-212 registration EI-SLM was damaged beyond economical repair when the nose gear collapsed on landing at Shannon Airport, Ireland. The aircraft was operating an international scheduled passenger flight from Manchester Airport, United Kingdom. There were no injuries amongst the four crew and 21 passengers on board.

== See also ==
- List of airlines
- Transport in Ireland
- Aer Arann Islands

== Bibliography ==
- Günter Endres, ed. (2010). Flight International World Airlines 2010. Sutton, Surrey, England: Reed Business Information. ISBN 978-1-898779-39-1.
