= List of Aer Lingus destinations =

This is a combined list of destinations operated by Aer Lingus, its subsidiary Aer Lingus UK, and regional franchise Aer Lingus Regional as of January 2022. The airline currently operates scheduled and limited charter flights to/from a total of 99 airports, across 24 countries in Europe, North America, the Canary Islands, and a seasonal flight to the Asian portion of Turkey.

== History ==
On 23 March 2020, Stobart Air, which operated under the Aer Lingus Regional brand, announced it would suspend all international flights due to the COVID-19 pandemic. However, its public service obligation (PSO) flights from Dublin Airport to Donegal Airport and Kerry Airport would continue.

On 29 March 2020, Aer Lingus began temporarily operating flights to Beijing Capital International Airport (IATA: PEK). This destination was organized in response to the COVID-19 pandemic, to collect personal protective equipment which was made in China for use in Ireland. The flights were not available for passenger bookings and did not carry flight attendants.

On 24 March 2021, Aer Lingus announced the launch of four new routes from Manchester Airport; New York–JFK and Orlando from 29 July 2021, Barbados from 20 October 2021 and Boston from summer 2022.

On 12 June 2021, Stobart Air, the operator of Aer Lingus Regional flights, entered liquidation, resulting in Aer Lingus Regional ceasing operations with immediate effect.

In October 2022, it was announced that Aer Lingus operations between Belfast City and London–Heathrow would transfer to Aer Lingus UK due to Brexit-related requirements that a European carrier could no longer fly domestic routes within the United Kingdom. These flights are operated by British Airways under Wet-Lease terms using the Aer Lingus UK flight numbers and callsigns. This currently does not affect the operations carried out by Emerald Airlines from Belfast City as an agreement is in place between the UK CAA, British Airways and themselves before Emerald Airlines securing a UK AOC.

In July 2026, Aer Lingus announced the forthcoming suspension of service on three North American routes (Denver, Las Vegas, Minneapolis/Saint Paul) while announcing that service on another (Seattle) would become summer-seasonal. Simultaneously, changes to their European network were announced, namely the suspension of the route to Split, and the conversion of Frankfurt, Hamburg and Malta services to summer-seasonal only.

== Destinations ==
Country	City	Airport	Notes	Refs
Austria	Vienna	Vienna International Airport		
Barbados	Bridgetown	Grantley Adams International Airport	Terminated	
Belgium	Brussels	Brussels Airport		
Bulgaria	Burgas	Burgas Airport	Seasonal	
Canada	Montreal	Montréal–Mirabel International Airport	Terminated	
Canada	Montreal	Montréal–Trudeau International Airport	Terminated	
Canada	Toronto	Toronto Pearson International Airport		
Croatia	Dubrovnik	Dubrovnik Airport	Seasonal	
Croatia	Pula	Pula Airport	Terminated	
Croatia	Split	Split Airport	Terminated	
Czech Republic	Prague	Václav Havel Airport Prague		
Denmark	Copenhagen	Copenhagen Airport	Terminated	
Finland	Helsinki	Helsinki Airport	Terminated	
Finland	Rovaniemi	Rovaniemi Airport	Seasonal charter	
France	Bordeaux	Bordeaux–Mérignac Airport		
France	La Rochelle	La Rochelle–Île de Ré Airport	Terminated	
France	Lyon	Lyon–Saint-Exupéry Airport		
France	Marseille	Marseille Provence Airport	Seasonal	
France	Montpellier	Montpellier–Méditerranée Airport	Seasonal	
France	Nantes	Nantes Atlantique Airport	Seasonal	
France	Nice	Nice Côte d'Azur Airport	Seasonal	
France	Paris	Charles de Gaulle Airport		
France	Perpignan	Perpignan–Rivesaltes Airport	Seasonal	
France	Rennes	Rennes–Saint-Jacques Airport	Terminated	
France	Toulouse	Toulouse–Blagnac Airport		
France	Tours	Tours Val de Loire Airport		
Germany	Berlin	Berlin Brandenburg Airport		
Germany	Berlin	Berlin Tegel Airport	Airport closed	
Germany	Düsseldorf	Düsseldorf Airport		
Germany	Frankfurt	Frankfurt Airport	Seasonal	
Germany	Hamburg	Hamburg Airport	Seasonal	
Germany	Hanover	Hannover Airport	Terminated	
Germany	Munich	Munich Airport		
Germany	Stuttgart	Stuttgart Airport	Terminated	
Greece	Athens	Athens International Airport		
Greece	Corfu	Corfu International Airport	Seasonal	
Greece	Heraklion	Heraklion International Airport	Seasonal	
Greece	Rhodes	Rhodes International Airport	Terminated	
Greece	Santorini	Santorini International Airport	Seasonal	
Hungary	Budapest	Budapest Ferenc Liszt International Airport		
Ireland	Cork	Cork Airport	Focus city	
Ireland	Donegal	Donegal Airport		
Ireland	Dublin	Dublin Airport	Hub	
Ireland	Galway	Galway Airport	Airport closed	
Ireland	Kerry	Kerry Airport	Terminated	
Ireland	Knock	Ireland West Airport		
Ireland	Shannon	Shannon Airport		
Ireland	Sligo	Sligo Airport	Airport closed	
Ireland	Waterford	Waterford Airport	Airport closed	
Isle of Man	Ronaldsway	Isle of Man Airport		
Italy	Alghero	Alghero–Fertilia Airport	Terminated	
Italy	Brindisi	Brindisi Airport	Seasonal	
Italy	Bologna	Bologna Guglielmo Marconi Airport	Terminated	
Italy	Catania	Catania–Fontanarossa Airport	Seasonal	
Italy	Milan	Milan Linate Airport		
Italy	Milan	Milan Malpensa Airport	Seasonal	
Italy	Naples	Naples International Airport	Seasonal	
Italy	Pisa	Pisa International Airport	Seasonal	
Italy	Rome	Rome Fiumicino Airport		
Italy	Turin	Turin Airport	Seasonal	
Italy	Venice	Venice Marco Polo Airport		
Italy	Verona	Verona Villafranca Airport		
Jersey	Jersey	Jersey Airport	Seasonal	
Latvia	Riga	Riga International Airport	Terminated	
Lithuania	Vilnius	Vilnius Airport	Terminated	
Malta	Valletta	Malta International Airport	Seasonal	
Mexico	Cancún	Cancún International Airport	Seasonal	
Morocco	Agadir	Agadir–Al Massira Airport	Terminated	
Morocco	Marrakesh	Marrakesh Menara Airport	Seasonal	
Netherlands	Amsterdam	Amsterdam Airport Schiphol		
Netherlands	Eindhoven	Eindhoven Airport	Terminated	
Norway	Tromso	Tromso Airport	Seasonal	
Norway	Oslo	Oslo Airport	Seasonal	
Poland	Warsaw	Warsaw Chopin Airport	Seasonal	
Portugal	Faro	Faro Airport		
Portugal	Lisbon	Lisbon Airport		
Portugal	Madeira	Madeira Airport	Terminated	
Romania	Bucharest	Bucharest Henri Coandă International Airport	Terminated	
Spain	Alicante	Alicante–Elche Miguel Hernández Airport		
Spain	Asturias	Asturias Airport	Seasonal	
Spain	Barcelona	Josep Tarradellas Barcelona–El Prat Airport		
Spain	Bilbao	Bilbao Airport		
Spain	Fuerteventura	Fuerteventura Airport	Seasonal	
Spain	Lanzarote	Lanzarote Airport		
Spain	Las Palmas	Gran Canaria Airport		
Spain	Madrid	Madrid–Barajas Airport		
Spain	Málaga	Málaga Airport		
Spain	Palma de Mallorca	Palma de Mallorca Airport	Seasonal	
Spain	Santiago de Compostela	Santiago–Rosalía de Castro Airport	Seasonal	
Spain	Seville	Seville Airport		
Spain	Tenerife	Tenerife South Airport		
Sweden	Stockholm	Stockholm Arlanda Airport	Terminated	
Switzerland	Geneva	Geneva Airport		
Switzerland	Zurich	Zurich Airport		
Turkey	Dalaman	Dalaman Airport	Terminated	
Turkey	İzmir	İzmir Adnan Menderes Airport	Seasonal	
United Arab Emirates	Dubai	Dubai International Airport	Terminated	
United Kingdom	Aberdeen	Aberdeen Airport		
United Kingdom	Belfast	Belfast City Airport		
United Kingdom	Blackpool	Blackpool Airport	Airport closed	
United Kingdom	Birmingham	Birmingham Airport		
United Kingdom	Bournemouth	Bournemouth Airport	Terminated	
United Kingdom	Bristol	Bristol Airport		
United Kingdom	Cardiff	Cardiff Airport		
United Kingdom	Derry	City of Derry Airport	Terminated	
United Kingdom	Doncaster/Sheffield	Doncaster Sheffield Airport	Airport closed	
United Kingdom	East Midlands	East Midlands Airport		
United Kingdom	Edinburgh	Edinburgh Airport		
United Kingdom	Exeter	Exeter Airport		
United Kingdom	Glasgow	Glasgow Airport		
United Kingdom	Inverness	Inverness Airport		
United Kingdom	Leeds/Bradford	Leeds Bradford Airport		
United Kingdom	Liverpool	Liverpool John Lennon Airport		
United Kingdom	London	Gatwick Airport	Terminated	
United Kingdom	London	Heathrow Airport		
United Kingdom	London	London City Airport	Terminated	
United Kingdom	London	London Southend Airport	Terminated	
United Kingdom	London	Luton Airport	Terminated	
United Kingdom	Manchester	Manchester Barton Aerodrome	Terminated	
United Kingdom	Manchester	Manchester Airport		
United Kingdom	Newcastle upon Tyne	Newcastle International Airport		
United Kingdom	Newquay	Newquay Airport	Seasonal	
United Kingdom	Southampton	Southampton Airport		
United Kingdom	Teesside	Teesside International Airport	Terminated	
United States	Baltimore	Baltimore/Washington International Airport	Terminated	
United States	Boston	Logan International Airport		
United States	Chicago	O'Hare International Airport		
United States	Cleveland	Cleveland Hopkins International Airport		
United States	Denver	Denver International Airport	Terminated	
United States	Hartford	Bradley International Airport		
United States	Indianapolis	Indianapolis International Airport		
United States	Las Vegas	Harry Reid International Airport	Ends 3 December 2026	
United States	Los Angeles	Los Angeles International Airport		
United States	Miami	Miami International Airport	Seasonal	
United States	Minneapolis	Minneapolis–Saint Paul International Airport	Terminated	
United States	Nashville	Nashville International Airport		
United States	New York City	John F. Kennedy International Airport		
United States	Newark	Newark Liberty International Airport		
United States	Orlando	Orlando International Airport		
United States	Philadelphia	Philadelphia International Airport		
United States	Pittsburgh	Pittsburgh International Airport		
United States	Raleigh/Durham	Raleigh–Durham International Airport		
United States	San Francisco	San Francisco International Airport		
United States	Seattle	Seattle–Tacoma International Airport	Seasonal	
United States	Washington, D.C.	Dulles International Airport		

== See also ==
- Aer Lingus UK destinations
- Aer Lingus Regional destinations
