= Aberdeen Airways =

Aberdeen Airways may refer to:

- An airline formed in 1934, that changed its name to Allied Airways in 1937
- An airline formed in 1989, following the takeover of Air Ecosse by Peregrine Air Services Ltd.
