= Malinair =

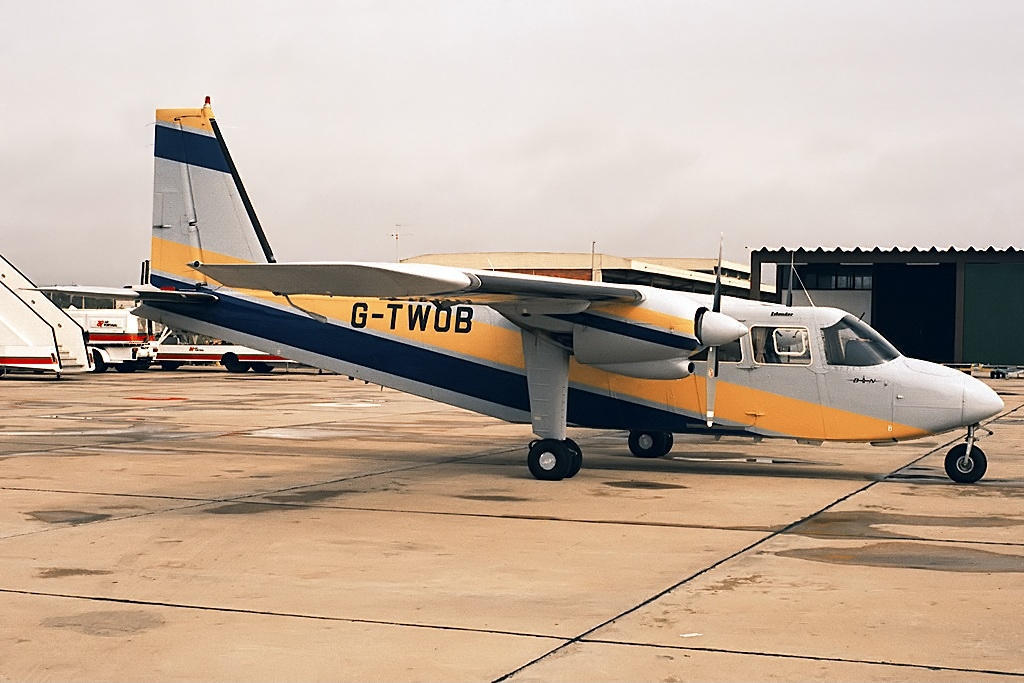
- Britten Norman Islander dash 8
IATA	ICAO	Call sign
WG	MAK	Malin
- Founded: June 1985
- Commenced operations: 1985
- Ceased operations: June 1987
- Operating bases: Glasgow Airport
- Fleet size: See Fleet below
- Destinations: Manchester, Glasgow, London, Aberdeen, Belfast
- Headquarters: Glasgow, Scotland, United Kingdom
- Key people: Frank Cannon

Malinair Ltd. was a commuter airline based at Glasgow Airport (GLA) in Scotland in the mid-1980s.

== History ==
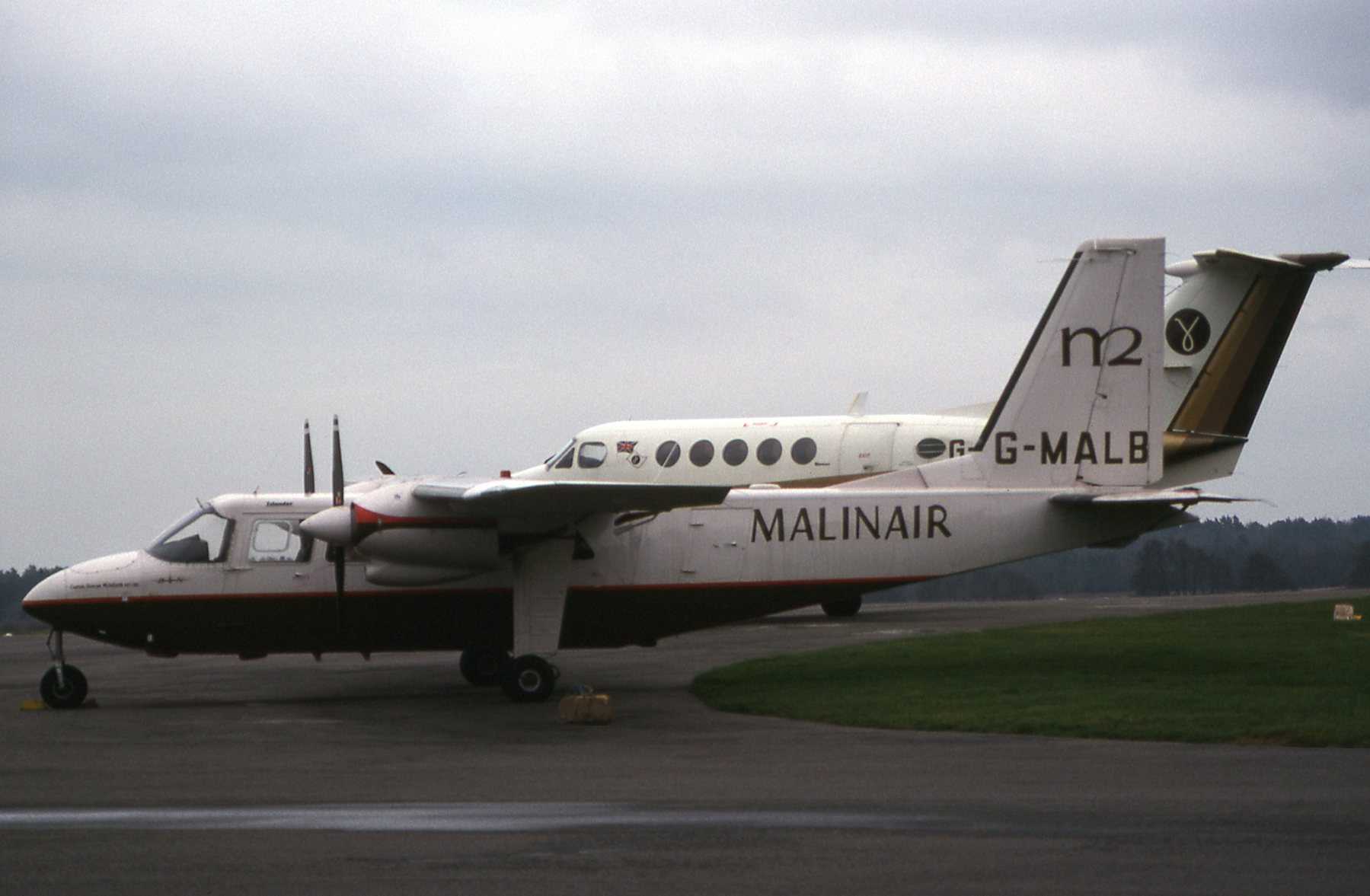
Britten Norman Islander

The company was founded in June 1985 by Glasgow lawyer Frank Cannon. Flight operations were launched in December with a Glasgow to Donegal service using 9 passenger Britten Norman Islander aircraft. A planned expansion saw the recruitment of a number of ex Air Ecosse staff, including Malinair's General Manager and Operations Manager. True scheduled services were started in 1986.

In the summer, Malinair began operating the former Air Ecosse Aberdeen-Glasgow-Belfast route with a leased Dornier 228 using Ecosse's route licence and WG flight code. By the following year the company had three BN.2 Britten-Norman Islanders and two further Do.228s operating a mix of daytime schedule/charter and night mail flights.

1987 heralded an expansion of service from Donegal with the launch of flights to Manchester using a Do.228, whilst another aircraft operated Glasgow-Teesside-Gatwick. For a short time a BN.2 operated a Glasgow to Humberside service. Night mail flights were operated from Belfast, Glasgow and Aberdeen, primarily for Datapost.

The end of Malinair was complex with the shareholders agreeing in June 1987 to sell the company to Air Ecosse. This regional airline had itself been in administration since January 1987 and had only recently been bought by Isle of Man-based Traditional Investments for £477,000. Despite ambitious plans including a £15 million contract for seven Dorniers, Malinair ceased operations in the autumn of 1987.
