= Aer Lingus UK =

British airline subsidiary of Aer Lingus (2021–2026)

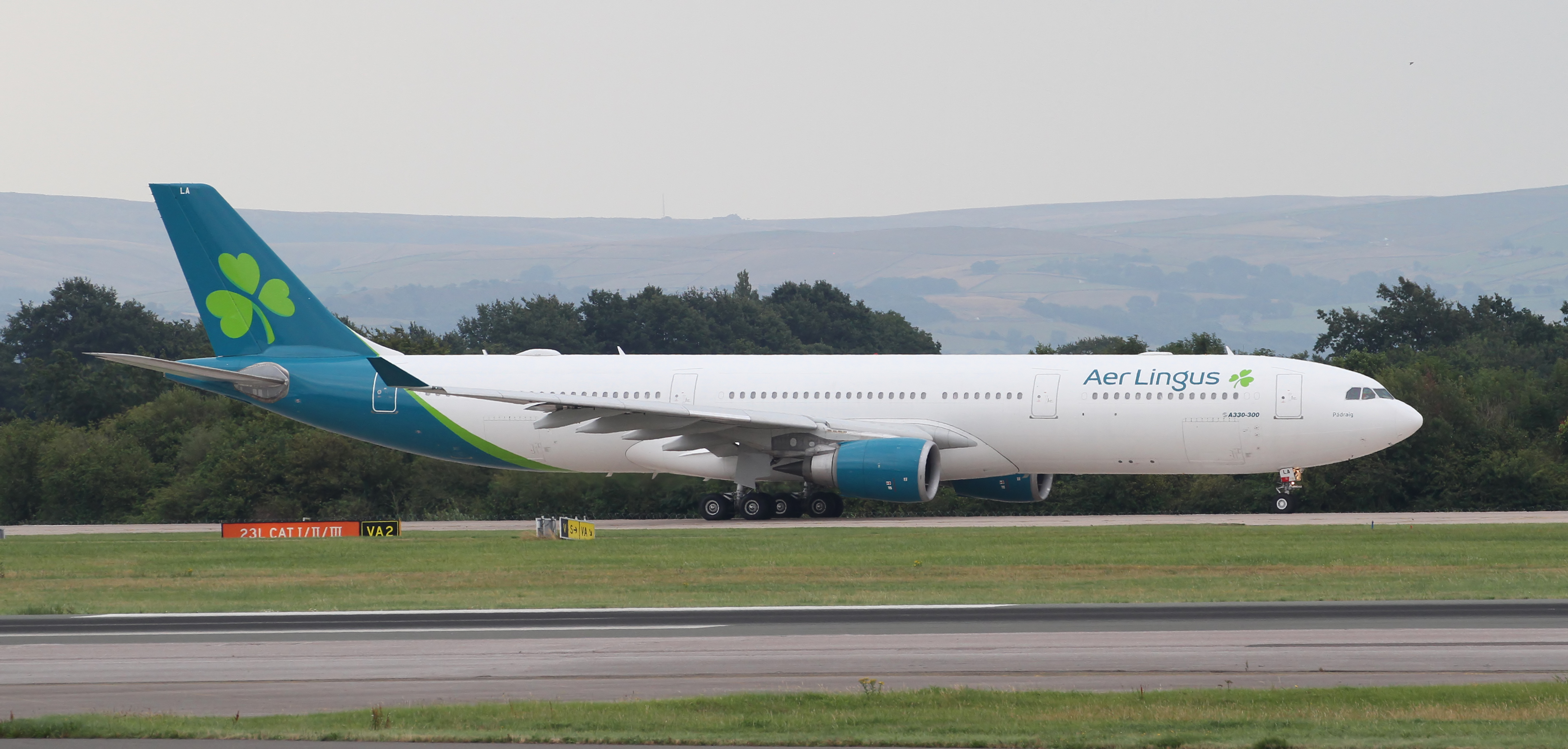
- Aer Lingus UK Airbus A330-300
IATA	ICAO	Call sign
EG	EUK	GREEN FLIGHT
- Founded: 25 May 2012; 14 years ago
- Commenced operations: 20 October 2021; 5 years ago
- Ceased operations: 31 March 2026; 6 months ago
- AOC #: GB 2471
- Operating bases: Manchester Airport
- Frequent-flyer program: AerClub (Avios)
- Fleet size: 2 (March 2026)
- Parent company: Aer Lingus
- Headquarters: Belfast, Northern Ireland, United Kingdom
- Key people: Eamon Kierans (Director)
- Employees: About 200 (January 2026)
- Website: aerlingus.com

Aer Lingus (U.K.) Limited, trading as Aer Lingus UK, was a British airline and a wholly owned subsidiary of the Irish Aer Lingus, part of International Airlines Group. The company was incorporated in Belfast in 2012 and stayed dormant until 2020, and it held its own UK air operator's certificate from July 2021. Its flights launched on 20 October 2021, with an inaugural service from Manchester Airport to Bridgetown, Barbados, and it later flew from Manchester to New York JFK and Orlando. It also acted as the marketing carrier for Aer Lingus's Belfast City–London Heathrow route from October 2022, which British Airways flew under a wet-lease. Aer Lingus closed its Manchester base after a pay dispute with cabin crew, and Aer Lingus UK ceased operations on 31 March 2026.

== History ==
=== Background and planning ===
Aer Lingus UK was founded on 25 May 2012 with its headquarters in Belfast, Northern Ireland, as a United Kingdom-based company. The company then remained dormant until 2020. In November 2020, plans for the airline involved launching the operation of transatlantic flights from the UK to the United States with the initial planned destinations being Boston, New York JFK, and Orlando from its Manchester base, followed by flights during the winter season to Bridgetown (Barbados). The airline's initial fleet plans consisted of two Airbus A321LRs and two Airbus A330-300s, all to be transferred from parent company Aer Lingus. The airline would conceptually compete with Virgin Atlantic, another British airline operating transatlantic flights from Manchester, as well as fill in part of the void left by Manchester-based and headquartered Thomas Cook Airlines, which ceased operations in September 2019.

=== Approvals and launch ===
In December 2020, the airline applied with the United States Department of Transportation (USDOT) for a foreign air carrier permit, which was approved in March 2021. Parent company Aer Lingus subsequently announced on 24 March 2021 that flights from Manchester Airport operated by Aer Lingus UK would launch to New York JFK and Orlando on 29 July 2021, to Barbados on 20 October 2021, and to Boston during summer 2022, creating up to 120 jobs. In June 2021, the airline announced that the commencement of services to the United States would be postponed until 30 September 2021. This was due to the international borders between the UK and the United States reopening later than expected.

On 8 July 2021, Aer Lingus UK was granted its air operator's certificate (AOC) by the UK CAA. The airline also submitted its AOC to the USDOT for the approval of its application. In the days prior to receiving its AOC, the airline officially transferred one Airbus A330-300 from parent company Aer Lingus, with the transfer of one Airbus A321LR and a further Airbus A330-300 following. On 25 August 2021, the airline's services to the United States were again postponed to December 2021 as a result of the continued delay of UK-US border restrictions being lifted. The airline's services to Barbados were unaffected, which launched on 20 October 2021 as planned. While the airline's routes to New York JFK and Orlando launched in December 2021, plans for the airline's Boston services were dropped.

In September 2022, Aer Lingus UK was the first airline to operate a flight into the then new Terminal C at Orlando International Airport.

=== Belfast City–Heathrow route ===
After Brexit, an Irish airline could no longer operate domestic flights within the United Kingdom under the arrangement that had previously applied, and the union Fórsa linked the end of Aer Lingus's own Belfast City–Heathrow operation to the expiry of the Irish carrier's temporary UK permission. From 30 October 2022 the route was marketed by Aer Lingus UK and flown by British Airways with Airbus A320-200 aircraft under a wet lease, with the flights keeping Aer Lingus flight numbers. The route had three daily flights. Of the 30 staff then employed on the route, 13 were to be redeployed to customer support roles in Belfast, 14 to Dublin, and three took unpaid leave, according to Fórsa. The CAA said that the wet-leasing arrangement had never been intended as a permanent solution.

=== Transatlantic network changes ===
In October 2022, Aer Lingus UK announced that its Manchester–New York JFK service would be operated by the Airbus A330-300 instead of the Airbus A321LR from April 2023. The change increased capacity on the route, a second A330-300 returned to the UK fleet and the A321LR returned to its Irish parent.

=== Pay dispute and closure ===
In October and November 2025, several strikes took place after cabin crew rejected a pay rise offer. The cabin crew were represented by Unite, and Aer Lingus also had a separate dispute with its pilots' association over the employment of Manchester-based pilots. Later in November Aer Lingus threatened to close the Manchester base after reviewing the base operations.

On 8 January 2026 Aer Lingus stopped selling transatlantic flights from Manchester for travel from 31 March 2026. A staff memo said that while the Manchester base was profitable, its margins were significantly below those of comparable parts of the Aer Lingus business, and that the options explored to raise them did not appear viable. The base then employed around 200 people, including nearly 130 cabin crew, and operated its transatlantic services with two aircraft. The article added that Aer Lingus had reported an operating profit of €135 million for the three months to June 2025 and that Unite had accused the airline of "economic vandalism".

On 28 January 2026, Aer Lingus confirmed to staff that long-haul flying from Manchester would end by 31 March 2026, with the New York JFK route finishing first on 23 February and the Barbados and Orlando services withdrawn as part of the closure; it said it would discuss redeployment within Aer Lingus or IAG, and severance terms, with affected staff. The airline also said that, subject to regulatory approval, it intended to operate a temporary Dublin–Barbados service in April and May 2026 to reaccommodate affected customers. Short-haul flights between Manchester and Ireland, operated by Aer Lingus and Aer Lingus Regional, were not affected. The airline's website said the same.

The final departure from Manchester took place on 30 March 2026, and the company ceased operations the following day, 31 March 2026. Aer Lingus did not tell ch-aviation whether it would keep the UK certificate for future use or surrender it.

== Destinations ==
Aer Lingus UK operated the following destinations:

Country	City	Airport	Start date	End date	Notes	Refs
Barbados	Bridgetown	Grantley Adams International Airport	20 October 2021	30 March 2026	Seasonal	
United Kingdom	Belfast	George Best Belfast City Airport	30 October 2022	22 March 2023	Operated by British Airways under wet-lease	
United Kingdom	London	Heathrow Airport	30 October 2022	22 March 2023	Operated by British Airways under wet-lease	
United Kingdom	Manchester	Manchester Airport	20 October 2021	31 March 2026	Base	
United States	New York City	John F. Kennedy International Airport	1 December 2021	23 February 2026		
United States	Orlando	Orlando International Airport	11 December 2021	31 March 2026		

== Fleet ==
As of August 2025, Aer Lingus UK operated an all-Airbus A330 fleet composed of the following aircraft:

Aer Lingus UK fleet
Aircraft	In service	Orders	Passengers			Notes
Aircraft	In service	Orders	J	Y	Total	Notes
Airbus A330-300	2	—	30	287	317	Transferred from Aer Lingus.
Total	2	—				

In the past, the airline also operated an A321LR.

=== Return of the fleet to Aer Lingus ===
After the closure, both A330-300s went back to the Irish parent. The aircraft registered EI-EDY (msn 1025) had been re-registered as G-EIDY for the UK operation; its last revenue flight under the UK certificate was on 2 March 2026, on the Orlando–Manchester route. It was re-registered in Ireland on 13 March 2026 and has flown for Aer Lingus under the Irish certificate since 19 March. The second aircraft, G-EILA (msn 1106), stayed on the UK certificate until the end of March, with its last service from Orlando on 30 March, and was flown to Dublin the next day. As of April 2026 it was parked there and still carried a British registration, with an export application filed.

== Frequent-flyer programme ==
AerClub is Aer Lingus' frequent-flyer programme, which consists of four tiers: the entry-level Green, Silver, Platinum, and Concierge. The club uses Avios points as its member currency.
