= Donegal Airport =

Airport in north-western Ireland

Donegal Airport Aerfort Dhún na nGall
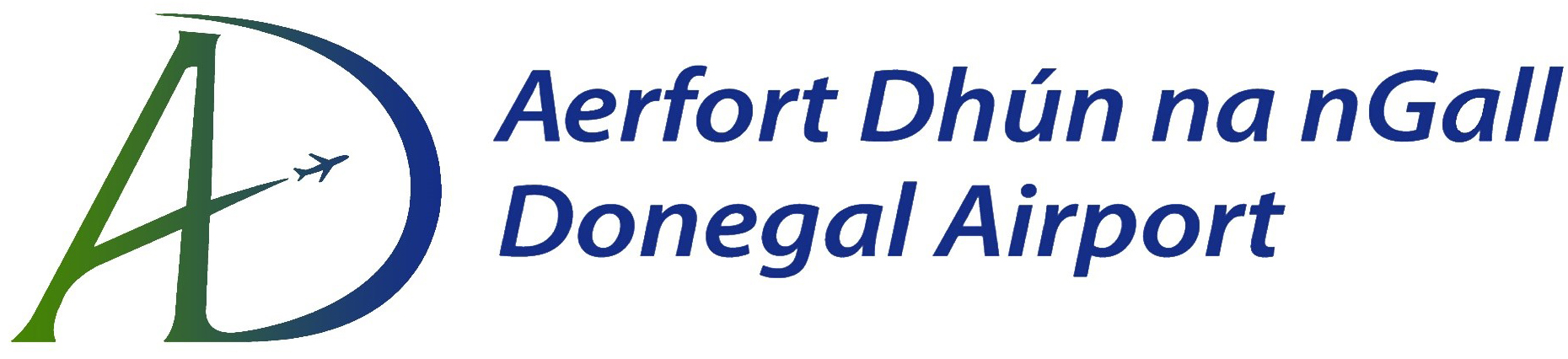

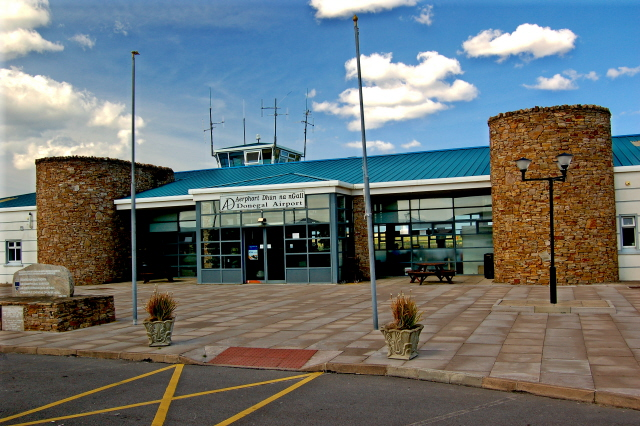
- IATA: CFN; ICAO: EIDL

Summary
- Airport type: Public
- Owner: Aerphort Idirnaisiúnta Dhún na nGall Teoranta
- Serves: County Donegal
- Location: Carrickfinn
- Elevation AMSL: 30 ft (9.1 m)
- Coordinates: 55°02′39″N 008°20′28″W
- Website: www.donegalairport.ie

Maps
- Location of airport in Ireland
- Interactive map of Donegal Airport

Runways
Direction	Length		Surface
Direction	m	ft	Surface
02/20	1,495	4,905	Bitumen/macadam

Statistics (2025)
- Passengers: 55,129
- Passenger change 24-25: ▲9%
- Aircraft movements: 1,680
- Movements change 24-25: ▲7%
- Source: Irish AIS Passengers/Movements

Donegal Airport (Irish: Aerfort Dhún na nGall) (IATA: CFN, ICAO: EIDL) is a regional airport in Ireland, serving County Donegal and the north-west. It is located on the coast, 2 NM (3.7 km; 2.3 mi) south-west of Bunbeg in Carrickfinn, a townland in The Rosses, a district in north-west County Donegal. It is about a 15-minute drive from Dungloe and Gweedore and 45 minutes from Letterkenny. It was generally known until the 1990s, and is still popularly known within County Donegal, as Carrickfinn Airport, from which its airport code (CFN) is derived.

== History ==
=== Early operations ===
The airfield was officially opened in March 1978, to serve the nearby IDA industrial estate with an expectation of service to Dublin Airport via City of Derry Airport. Until the mid-1980s, the runway was a 2,000 ft (610 m) grass strip. This was replaced by a hard surface runway with temporary terminal buildings. The airport started passenger operations on Christmas Eve 1985, with flights to Glasgow International Airport and latterly Manchester Airport operated by Malinair until its bankruptcy in 1987. The developments to enable this were completed with funds and assistance from the Government of Ireland, private investors, Údarás na Gaeltachta, Donegal County Council, the International Fund for Ireland and the European Regional Development Fund. The Malinair service to Glasgow was briefly replaced by Air Ecosse in June 1987 before being reinstated by Loganair in 1988.

In 1989 the runway was extended to 1,450 m (4,760 ft), with a further extension to 1,500 m (4,900 ft), installation of runway safety areas and a new terminal building with modern navigational aids and equipment occurring in 1992–93.

=== The 1990s ===
Ryanair added service to London Luton Airport (via Sligo Airport) in June 1990, however this service was suspended in January 1991 due to fuel costs and security concerns relating to the Gulf War and did not resume. In 1994, the airport played a crucial role in the relief of Tory Island during lengthy storms that prevented the shipment of food or fuel to the island by sea, with Irish Air Corps helicopters using the airport for uplift of fuel, goods and passengers. Macair, a Scottish airline leasing aircraft from Sun-Air of Scandinavia, briefly launched service to Edinburgh Airport and Birmingham Airport in 1995 but went bust shortly afterwards.

Gill Airways provided service to Glasgow Prestwick Airport in 1996, and also 1999. Also in 1996, the initial Public Service Obligation contract for services to Dublin Airport was awarded to Ireland Airways, who began operating this service. There has been a continuous service to Dublin since.

Glasgow services by Loganair ceased in 1997 when it was under the ownership of British Regional Airlines, but were replaced by Bright Air. Aer Arran replaced the failed Ireland Airways on the Dublin PSO in 1998. The airport's runway lighting system was destroyed in a vandalism attack on 13 December 1999, p4, with a repeat attack in March 2000.

Up to the 1990s, the airport was generally referred to as Carrickfinn Airport/Airfield/Airstrip and very rarely as Donegal Airport, as there were plans to open a "Donegal Airport" in the vicinity of Letterkenny, with Donegal County Council preferring to reserve that name for the Letterkenny plans.

=== The 2000s ===
From July 2002 to 2003, the Dublin PSO route was operated by Euroceltic Airways.

On 21 February 2007, the Irish Government announced that it would be giving €3.8 million to the airport in capital grant money. Domestic service to Dublin was resumed by Aer Arann. Aer Arann operated flights to Cork via Dublin in 2009 until they reduced their Cork-Dublin service to six times per week. The route closed in March 2010. In February 2010, Aer Arann closed its service to Glasgow Prestwick Airport and relocated to Glasgow Int’l Airport.

Late 2000s and early 2010s, CityJet operated a Saturday seasonal charter flight to Rotterdam between April and September using a Fokker 50.

=== 2010s ===
Service to Dublin was operated from 2012 to 2015 by Loganair and Flybe using a Saab 340 which rotated via Glasgow to provide aircraft and crew replenishment. Stobart Air, operating as Aer Lingus Regional, received public service obligation funding from the Irish Government to subsidise the route to Dublin. A contract was awarded in 2014, and the service commenced on 1 March 2015, using an ATR 42-300 (reg nos. EI-CBK or EI-EHH). The service was operated using an ATR 42-600 (reg nos. EI-GEV) from 2018 until the demise of Stobart Air, in June 2021.

The airport was voted the world's most scenic landing spot in 2018, 2019, and 2020.

=== 2020s ===
In July 2021, Amapola Flyg, a Swedish regional airline, was awarded the PSO route from Dublin to Donegal, as a temporary measure following the demise of Stobart Air. The contract was awarded for seven months from July 2021 until February 2022. In March 2022, Emerald Airlines (on behalf of Aer Lingus Regional) began flights to Dublin operated by an ATR72-600 twice daily.

In July 2023, Loganair relaunched their route to Glasgow International Airport with an ATR42, three times weekly up until 24 September 2023. Due to strong passenger demand on the route, Loganair announced that an increased 2024 schedule will operate up to four times weekly from April–October. The route would continue to operate throughout the winter schedule for 2024/2025, twice a week, on Friday and Sunday.

In June 2025, the runway designators were changed from 03/21 to 02/20 to match the magnetic headings of the runway ends, which had gradually decreased with magnetic declination. New non-precision RNAV approaches were also introduced, allowing suitably equipped aircraft to descend lower to the ground before having to abandon a landing attempt in poor visibility.

Until February 2026, the Public Service Obligation dictating the airport's schedule included a return flight from Dublin in the afternoon. In January, it was announced that this afternoon service would be replaced by an evening one. This was met with backlash from communities throughout County Donegal, who were concerned the change in schedule would impact cancer patients travelling between counties for treatment. Donegal Cancer Flights and Services, a local charity that provides subsidised flights to cancer patients and their families, led a petition that received over 20,000 signatures, which gained national attention and was publicly backed by crooner Daniel O'Donnell. On 1 April, TD Pat "The Cope" Gallagher confirmed that Minister for Transport Darragh O'Brien had approved the restoration of the previous flight rotation.

== Airlines and destinations ==
The following airlines operate regular scheduled flights to and from Donegal:

Airlines	Destinations
Aer Lingus	Dublin
Loganair	Glasgow

== Statistics ==
Passenger numbers
Year	Passenger numbers	% Change YoY
2008	65,539	
2009	50,761	▼22.5%
2010	46,825	▼7.8%
2011	38,309	▼18.1%
2012	29,226	▼23.7%
2013	33,768	▲15.5%
2014	35,415	▲4.9%
2015	36,552	▲3.2%
2016	44,156	▲20.8%
2017	46,514	▲5.3%
2018	46,537	▲0.05%
2019	48,542	▲4.3%
2020	18,067	▼62.8%
2021	14,603	▼19.1%
2022	36,934	▲152.9%
2023	41,867	▲13%
2024	50,530	▲21%
2025	55,129	▲9%
^{Sources: Central Statistics Office/Department of Transport}

== Airport data ==
- Traffic permitted: instrument flight rules/visual flight rules
- Strength Pavement Classification Number (PCN): 21/F/B/X/T
- Tower frequency: 129.80 MHz
- Navigational aids: non-directional beacon (NDB) 361 kHz "CFN", distance measuring equipment (DME) 110.3 MHz "IFN", localizer LLZ 110.3 MHz "IFN"
