= Aer Lingus Regional =

Aer Lingus brand used for commuter and regional flights

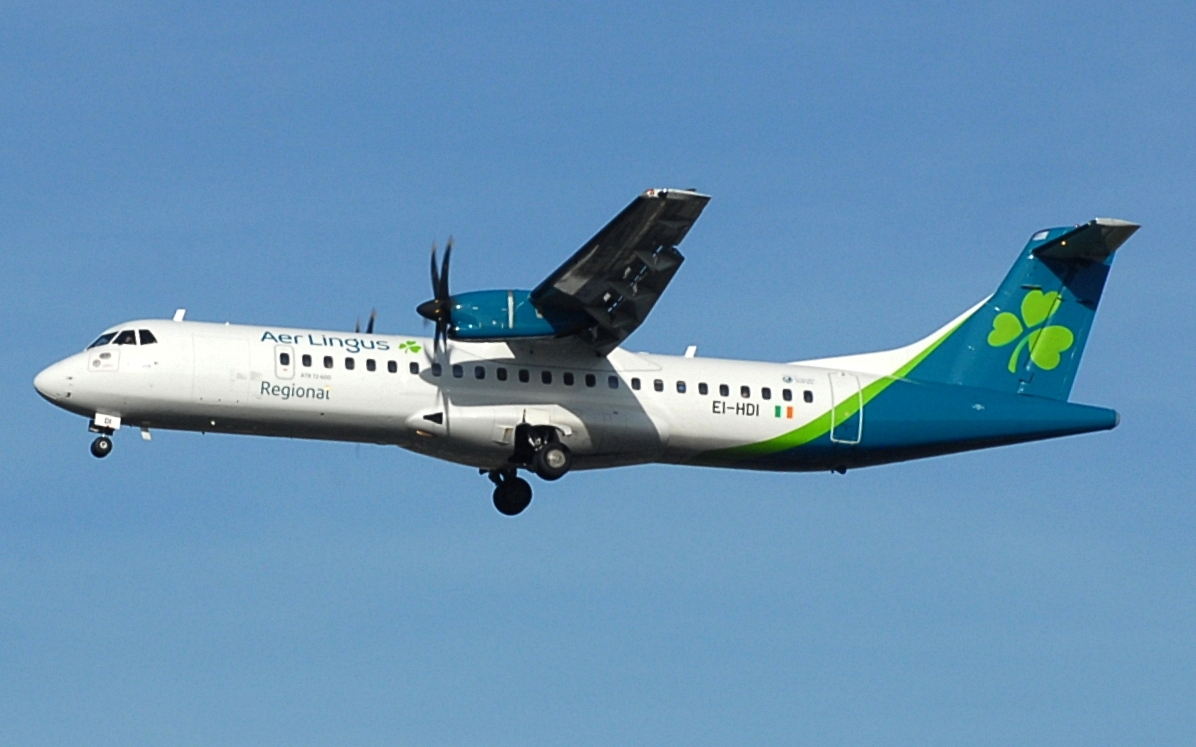
- Emerald Airlines ATR 72-600 operated for Aer Lingus Regional
IATA	ICAO	Call sign
EI	EAI; EAG	GEMSTONE; GREENSTONE
- Founded: 26 January 2010; 16 years ago
- Commenced operations: 28 March 2010; 16 years ago
- Hubs: Belfast–City; Dublin
- Frequent-flyer program: AerClub Avios
- Fleet size: 19
- Destinations: 14
- Parent company: Aer Lingus
- Headquarters: Cloghran, County Dublin, Ireland
- Website: www.aerlingus.com

Aer Lingus Regional is an Aer Lingus brand which is used for commuter and regional flights. Aer Lingus Regional scheduled passenger services operate primarily from Ireland to the United Kingdom, France, and the Channel Islands, along with services from Belfast, Northern Ireland to the places mentioned. Services were operated by Aer Arann and then its successor Stobart Air until the latter's closure in June 2021. The contract for the franchise was then awarded to Emerald Airlines and services resumed on 26 February 2022.

== History ==
=== Foundation with Aer Arann ===
The possibility of the brand, and associated operating arrangement were first announced on 6 January 2010, when Aer Lingus hinted to the media that it was interested in expanding its UK services with the help of what was then Aer Arann. It was also mentioned as solely a Cork expansion with no mention of Dublin, with Aer Lingus saying bulk seats would be bought on Aer Arann planes without an actual financial take-over.

On 26 January 2010, it was confirmed that Aer Lingus and Aer Arann would launch a new franchise agreement. On that same date, new routes from Dublin to Doncaster-Sheffield and Durham Tees Valley were announced by Aer Lingus Regional, in addition to a new route from Cork to Glasgow. It was also decided that previous Aer Arann routes to Cork would all be transferred to Aer Lingus Regional. Aer Arann services to Blackpool and Cardiff from Dublin would be transferred to Aer Lingus Regional also.

Though Aer Arann and Aer Lingus founded Aer Lingus Regional together, Aer Arann operated all flights and managed those flights with Aer Arann flight crew on board. All aircraft were painted in Aer Lingus Regional livery, and both airlines anticipated new routes being announced as the new venture between the two airlines grew.

In March 2012, Aer Arann streamlined its own-branded services into Aer Lingus Regional, transferring to Aer Lingus Regional routes from Dublin to the Isle of Man and Kerry, Waterford to London-Luton, London-Southend and Manchester. The airline later suspended all services from Waterford.

In 2012, Aer Arann announced that it intended to purchase eight ATR 72-600 aircraft to help replace and expand its operations. The first of these aircraft were delivered in late April 2013 and the remainder expected through 2024.

=== Stobart Air ===
On 20 March 2014, Aer Arann announced its intention to re-brand and form Stobart Air to allow the company to seek further franchise agreements. There was no change to the operation of Aer Lingus Regional services. On 27 November 2014, Stobart Air was awarded public service obligation (PSO) contracts between Dublin and Donegal Airport from 1 February 2015. The existing Dublin to Kerry Airport route was also extended to 2017. On the same date, all services to/from Shannon were confirmed to be axed from 5 January 2015, and the base there closed on the same date. The airline later resumed services to/from Shannon.

In January 2018, the Minister for Transport, Tourism and Sport, Shane Ross, announced that Stobart Air would continue its two PSO routes, Dublin to Donegal and Kerry, until January 2022. That year saw the airline adding an additional 70,000 seats during its winter season, with 580 flights a week.

==== COVID-19 ====
Due to the COVID-19 pandemic, all international flights were first reduced to a limited schedule and then temporarily suspended from 28 March 2020 until further notice. The two domestic PSO services continued, to maintain "vital links".

Aer Lingus Group, together with Stobart Air, announced on 23 July 2020 that it was to establish a base at Belfast–City Airport with six new routes to Birmingham, East Midlands, Edinburgh, Exeter, Leeds/Bradford and Manchester with five ATR72-600 aircraft based at Belfast City and over 200 weekly flights. The news was welcomed by airport and government officials in what was described as "an extremely challenging environment" during the coronavirus pandemic.

In 2021, due to the continued impact of the COVID-19 pandemic on air travel, Stobart Air temporally laid off most of its 400 employees, with only 16% of Stobart Air's workforce to be retained, primarily to operate the domestic Irish routes.

==== End of Stobart Air ====
When he was announcing the end of first quarter results for Aer Lingus' parent IAG in May 2020, Chief Executive Willie Walsh revealed that a different provider might operate the routes once the Stobart Air contract expired at the end of 2022.

Following a competitive tender process in 2020, Stobart Air was not successful in retaining the Aer Lingus Regional Franchise. From January 2023 a new operator would take over, with Emerald Airlines as the preferred option.

On 11 June 2021, Stobart Air informed Aer Lingus that it was terminating its franchise agreement, as the company was to be placed into liquidation, resulting in the cancellation of all Aer Lingus Regional flights, affecting 12 routes. Aer Lingus subsequently announced that it would operate five of these routes for the time being, and that BA CityFlyer would operate two for at least a week. The former fleet of ATR planes was placed on the market by Stobart's principal shareholder.

The Irish government sought an airline to operate the two PSO routes on a temporary basis before a new tender for a long-term contract. Amapola Flyg was granted the Dublin–Donegal PSO route on a temporary basis, while Ryanair launched Dublin–Kerry service on a commercial basis without PSO funding.

=== Emerald Airlines ===
Emerald Airlines was confirmed as the Aer Lingus Regional franchise operator in August 2021, leasing six ATR 72-600s from Chorus Aviation, formerly operated by Stobart Air and Virgin Australia Regional Airlines, and planned to launch operations under the brand on 17 March 2022. Prior to its planned launch, Emerald was granted the PSO route between Dublin and Donegal, accelerating the brand's relaunch of operations to 26 February 2022.

== Destinations ==
As of November 2024, Aer Lingus Regional operates or has previously operated to the following destinations:

Country	City	Airport	Notes	Refs
Channel Islands	Jersey	Jersey Airport	Seasonal	
France	La Rochelle	La Rochelle–Île de Ré Airport	Terminated	
France	Rennes	Rennes–Saint-Jacques Airport	Seasonal	
Ireland	Cork	Cork Airport		
Ireland	Donegal	Donegal Airport		
Ireland	Dublin	Dublin Airport	Hub	
Ireland	Kerry	Kerry Airport	Terminated	
Ireland	Shannon	Shannon Airport	Terminated	
Ireland	Waterford	Waterford Airport	Airport closed	
Isle of Man	Ronaldsway	Isle of Man Airport		
United Kingdom	Aberdeen	Aberdeen Airport		
United Kingdom	Belfast	Belfast City Airport	Hub	
United Kingdom	Birmingham	Birmingham Airport		
United Kingdom	Blackpool	Blackpool Airport	Airport closed	
United Kingdom	Bournemouth	Bournemouth Airport	Terminated	
United Kingdom	Bristol	Bristol Airport		
United Kingdom	Cardiff	Cardiff Airport		
United Kingdom	Doncaster/Sheffield	Doncaster Sheffield Airport	Airport closed	
United Kingdom	East Midlands	East Midlands Airport		
United Kingdom	Edinburgh	Edinburgh Airport		
United Kingdom	Exeter	Exeter Airport		
United Kingdom	Glasgow	Glasgow Airport		
United Kingdom	Inverness	Inverness Airport		
United Kingdom	Leeds/Bradford	Leeds Bradford Airport		
United Kingdom	Liverpool	Liverpool John Lennon Airport		
United Kingdom	London	London Southend Airport	Terminated	
United Kingdom	London	Luton Airport	Terminated	
United Kingdom	Manchester	Manchester Airport		
United Kingdom	Newcastle upon Tyne	Newcastle International Airport		
United Kingdom	Newquay	Newquay Airport		
United Kingdom	Southampton	Southampton Airport		
United Kingdom	Teesside	Teesside International Airport	Terminated	

== Fleet ==
As of May 2025, Aer Lingus Regional — operated by Emerald Airlines — operates the following aircraft:

Aer Lingus Regional fleet
Aircraft	In service	orders	Passengers	Notes
ATR 72-600	19	1	70	Operated by Emerald Airlines.
ATR 72-600	19	1	72	Operated by Emerald Airlines.
Total	19	1		

== See also ==
- List of airlines
- Transport in Ireland
