= Emerald Airlines =

Irish regional airline

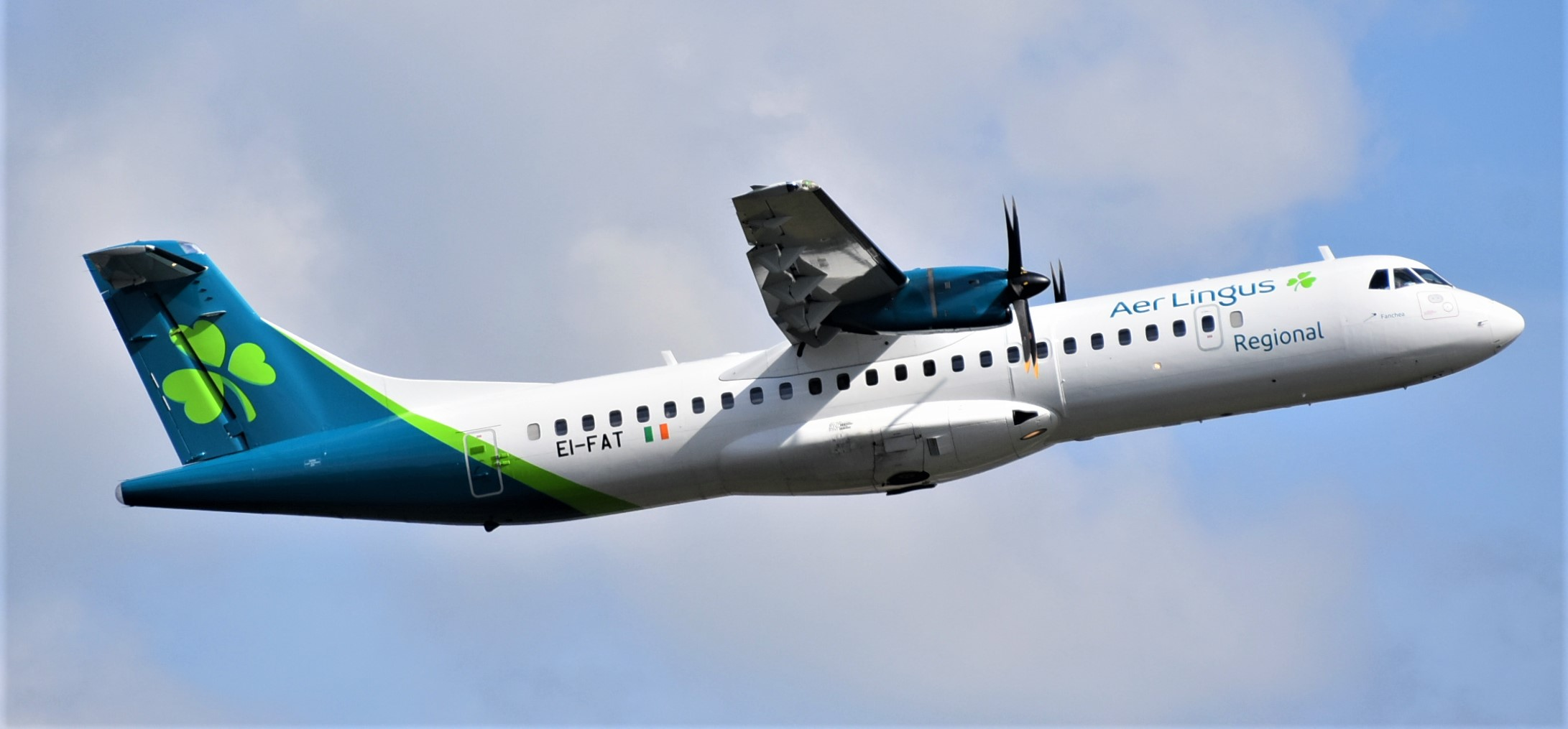
- Emerald Airlines ATR 72-600 in 2023
IATA	ICAO	Call sign
EA	EAI EAG (Note: Emerald Airlines UK)	GEMSTONE EMERALD CITY (Note: Formerly GREENSTONE, changed 1 July 2026)
- Founded: May 2020; 6 years ago
- Commenced operations: 26 February 2022; 4 years ago
- Hubs: Dublin; Belfast–City
- Subsidiaries: Emerald Airlines (UK)
- Fleet size: 20
- Destinations: 22
- Headquarters: Dublin Airport, Dublin, Ireland
- Key people: Conor McCarthy (Chairman)
- Website: www.emeraldairlines.com

Emerald Airlines is an Irish regional airline headquartered in Dublin, on the grounds of Dublin Airport. In August 2021, the airline became the operator of the Aer Lingus Regional franchise, before operations launched on 26 February 2022.

== History ==
On 6 November 2020, it was reported that Emerald Airlines was bidding to operate the Aer Lingus Regional franchise, with the winning airline to operate flights under the franchise beginning in January 2023. The airline had also submitted an application for an Irish Air Carrier Operating Licence. The following week, it was announced that Aer Lingus had chosen Emerald as the preferred operator of the franchise, with agreements on the deal expected to be finalised in early 2021. Following the June 2021 liquidation of Stobart Air, the previous operator of the Aer Lingus Regional franchise, Emerald Airlines hoped to start operations as early as October 2021, ahead of the original January 2023 operating date. Subsequently, Emerald was officially signed as the Aer Lingus Regional franchise operator in August 2021, and received its air operator's certificate (AOC) in September 2021.

On 17 December 2021, Aer Lingus announced that franchised regional flights operated by Emerald would launch starting on 17 March 2022. Additionally, Emerald established a subsidiary company in Northern Ireland, incorporated as Emerald Airlines UK, and applied for an AOC in the United Kingdom with the UK CAA. On 7 January 2022, it was announced that Emerald had been awarded a PSO contract to operate a route between Donegal and Dublin from 26 February 2022, prior to its original March launch.

== Destinations ==
As of March 2023, Emerald Airlines operates to the following destinations under the Aer Lingus Regional franchise:

Country	City	Airport	Notes	Ref.
France	Brest	Brest Bretagne Airport	Seasonal	
Ireland	Cork	Cork Airport		
Ireland	Donegal	Donegal Airport		
Ireland	Dublin	Dublin Airport	Hub	
Isle of Man	Ronaldsway	Isle of Man Airport		
Jersey	Jersey	Jersey Airport	Seasonal	
United Kingdom	Aberdeen	Aberdeen Airport		
United Kingdom	Belfast	Belfast City Airport	Hub	
United Kingdom	Birmingham	Birmingham Airport		
United Kingdom	Bristol	Bristol Airport		
United Kingdom	Cardiff	Cardiff Airport		
United Kingdom	East Midlands	East Midlands Airport		
United Kingdom	Edinburgh	Edinburgh Airport		
United Kingdom	Exeter	Exeter Airport		
United Kingdom	Glasgow	Glasgow Airport		
United Kingdom	Inverness	Inverness Airport		
United Kingdom	Leeds	Leeds Bradford Airport		
United Kingdom	Liverpool	Liverpool John Lennon Airport		
United Kingdom	London	Gatwick Airport	Operated for British Airways	
United Kingdom	Manchester	Manchester Airport		
United Kingdom	Newcastle Upon Tyne	Newcastle Airport		
United Kingdom	Newquay	Newquay Airport		
United Kingdom	Southampton	Southampton Airport		

=== Airline partnership ===
Emerald Airlines currently has a franchise partnership with the Irish flag carrier Aer Lingus.

== Fleet ==
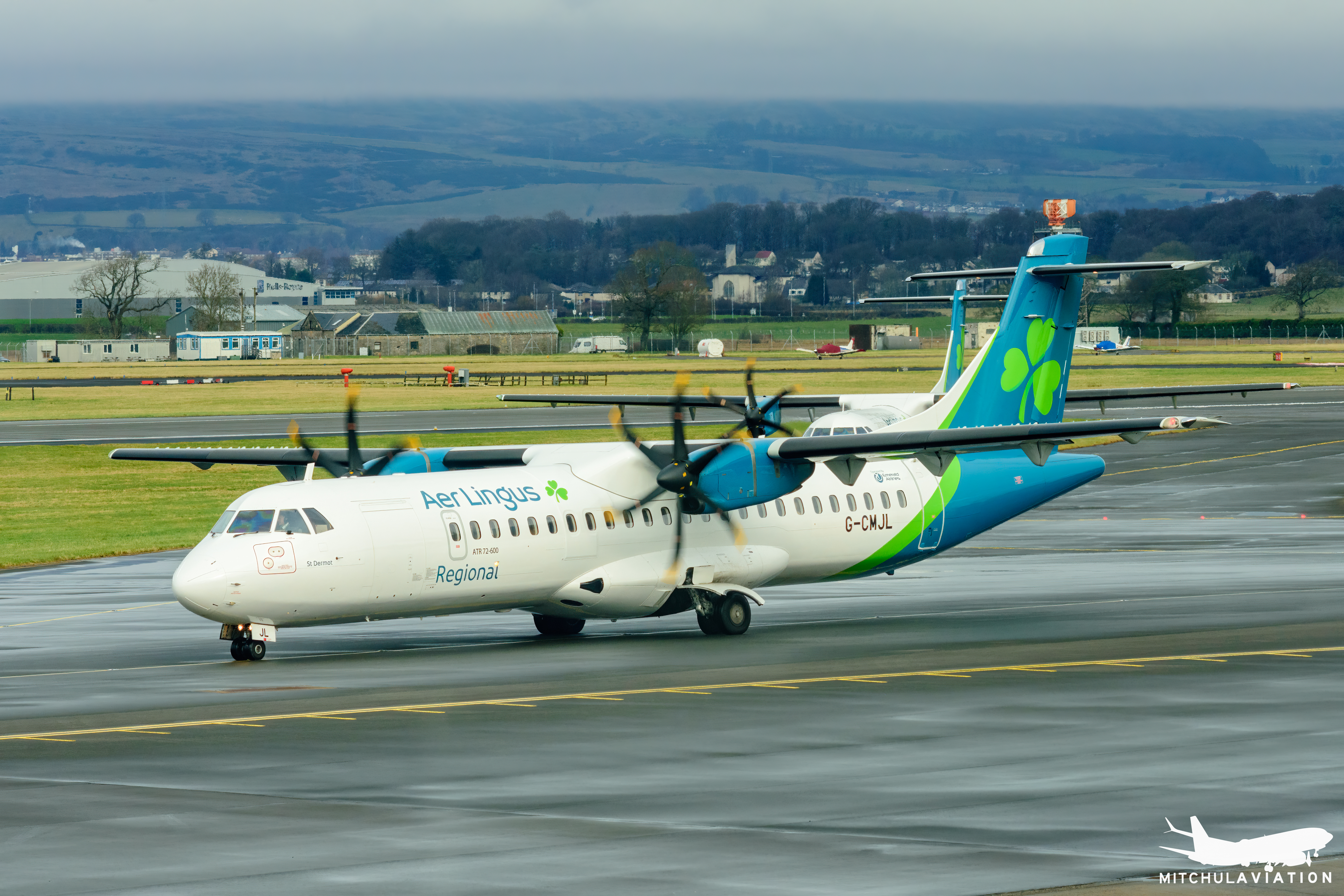
An ATR 72-600 of Aer Lingus Regional, operated by Emerald Airlines UK (G-CMJL) at Glasgow Airport

=== Current fleet ===
As of July 2026, Emerald Airlines operates the following aircraft:

Emerald Airlines fleet
Aircraft	In service	Orders	Passengers	Notes
ATR 72-600	20	—	70	7 operated by Emerald Airlines UK.
ATR 72-600	20	—	72	7 operated by Emerald Airlines UK.
Total	20	—		

=== Fleet development ===
Emerald's first aircraft order was an agreement to lease six ATR 72-600s from Chorus Aviation on 23 August 2021, which consisted of ATRs formerly operated by Stobart Air and Virgin Australia Regional Airlines. On 4 October 2021, the airline leased an additional four ATR 72-600s from Nordic Aviation Capital.

=== Former fleet ===
As of August 2025, Emerald Airlines operated 20 ATR 72-600 (including 7 operated by Emerald Airlines UK)

== Financial data ==
In 2022, Emerald recorded revenue of €81.34 million and pre-tax losses of €21.35 million, which the company attributed to startup costs in its first year of operation. In 2023, Emerald recorded revenue of €166.74 million and a pre-tax loss of €11.52 million.

The company became profitable in 2024, when it recorded revenue of €201 million and an operating profit of €9.6 million.
