= Belfast City Airport =

Airport in Belfast, Northern Ireland

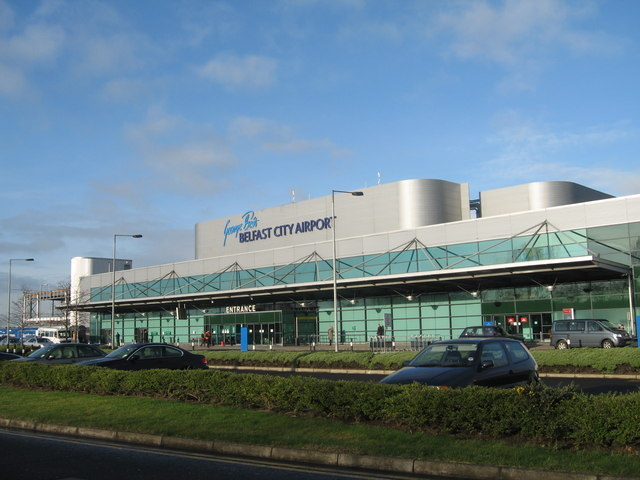
- IATA: BHD; ICAO: EGAC

Summary
- Airport type: Public
- Owner: 3i
- Operator: Belfast City Airport Limited
- Location: Belfast, Northern Ireland
- Opened: 16 March 1938 (88 years ago)
- Hub for: Aer Lingus
- Elevation AMSL: 15 ft (4.6 m)
- Coordinates: 54°37′05″N 05°52′21″W
- Website: www.belfastcityairport.com

Map
- Location in Greater Belfast Location in Northern Ireland Location on the island of Ireland Location in the United Kingdom

Runways
Direction	Length		Surface
Direction	m	ft	Surface
04/22	1,829	6,000	Asphalt

Statistics (2024)
- Passengers: 2,391,124
- Passenger change 23-24: ▲13.0%
- Aircraft movements: 29,282
- Movements change 22-23: ▲15.7%
- Sources: UK AIP at NATS; Statistics from the UK Civil Aviation Authority

Belfast City Airport, formally George Best Belfast City Airport (IATA: BHD, ICAO: EGAC), is an international airport in Belfast, Northern Ireland. Situated in County Down, it is adjacent to the Belfast Harbour and is three miles (five kilometres) from Belfast City Centre. It shares the site with the Spirit AeroSystems (formerly Short Brothers/Bombardier) aircraft manufacturing facility. The airport began commercial operations in 1983, and was known as "Belfast City Airport" until it was renamed in 2006 in memory of George Best, the professional footballer from Belfast. The airport has a CAA public use aerodrome licence (number P862) that allows flights for the public transport of passengers or for flying instruction.

As of September 2025, five airlines operate 24 routes across the UK and Europe from Belfast City Airport. In 2024, the airport handled over 2.3 million passengers, having peaked at 2.7 million in 2010. The airport serves as a regional base for Aer Lingus and British Airways who are the largest operators there. Ground handling is provided by Swissport and Menzies Aviation, the latter also offering cargo handling services.

== History ==
=== Early years ===
Sydenham Airport was established by Shorts beside its Belfast factory at Sydenham in 1937. It was opened on 16 March 1938 by Anne Chamberlain, the wife of then British Prime Minister, Neville Chamberlain. The inaugural flight was to Glasgow, Scotland. This became Belfast's main civilian airport from 1938 to 1939. The airfield was requisitioned by the Royal Air Force as RAF Sydenham in 1941, then transferred to the Royal Navy, becoming HMS Gadwall (also known as RNAS Belfast or RNAS Sydenham) in 1943. RAF Nutts Corner then became Belfast's main airport (while Aldergrove would later become the primary airport in Northern Ireland).

In 1952, the runway was extended to its present 6,000 feet (1,800 m). The airfield at Sydenham continued to be used for military purposes until the 1970s (reverting to RAF Belfast in 1973 and closing in 1978), including a period of use by the Fleet Air Arm as a naval aircraft storage unit. After this, it was used solely by Shorts.

In 1983, following interest from airlines and customers, the airfield was opened for commercial flights as Belfast Harbour Airport (subsequently Belfast City Airport and then with its current name). Its IATA airport code BHD refers to Belfast Harbour and to its location in County Down. Jersey European began operations at the airport in 1988. At the time of its demise in 2020, the airline - by then called Flybe - operated a large base from the airport.

=== Development from 2000 to 2020 ===
A new terminal was officially opened on 3 June 2001. Following major capital investment Bombardier sold the airport in 2003 for £35 million to the Spanish company Ferrovial, the owner of BAA Airports. Ferrovial re-sold the airport in September 2008 for £132.5 million to ABN Amro Global Infrastructure Fund.

In March 2006, it was announced that the airport would be renamed in memory of Northern Irish footballer George Best. The new name, George Best Belfast City Airport, and signage were revealed at the renaming ceremony attended by Best's family and friends on 22 May 2006, which would have been Best's 60th birthday. The renaming of the airport caused controversy, with many articles in local and national print media highlighting the mixed feelings of Belfast residents. Also in March 2006 Flybe announced that it would be naming its Belfast City – Manchester service after the footballer, dedicating a plane to him.

In October 2007 Ryanair established its 23rd base at the airport, operating five routes and carrying 800,000 annual passengers. The airline closed its Belfast City base in 2010 due to delays in the planned runway extension. The airline stated that it would fly to European destinations from the airport if the runway was extended.

In January 2010 easyJet commenced flights to London Luton, though the airline moved the route back to Belfast International in 2011.

Manx2 moved its Isle of Man service to the airport in 2010, however the airline has since ceased operations.

In January 2011 Bmibaby moved its Belfast base to the airport, in order to keep its operation under one roof with sister airline BMI. The airline ceased operations from Belfast City Airport in June 2012.

In October 2012 Aer Lingus moved its services from Belfast International to the airport. The airline launched flights to five destinations, though it has since reduced their operations to just one route. Spanish carrier Vueling launched summer-seasonal flights to Barcelona in May 2015, though the route was cancelled in late 2015. Dutch carrier KLM launched daily flights to Amsterdam in 2015, with flights operated by KLM Cityhopper. Brussels Airlines launched flights to Brussels in 2016, though the airline axed the route in 2017. In early 2017, Eastern Airways commenced flights to the Isle of Man following the demise of Citywing, though the airline axed the route in 2018. Icelandic carrier Air Iceland Connect commenced flights to Keflavik in 2017 on behalf of Icelandair, though the route was cancelled in 2018. Scottish airline Loganair commenced operations to Carlisle in 2019, followed by Dundee in 2020.

In June 2017 the airport was sold by the EISER Global Infrastructure Fund to a fund managed by 3i.

=== 2020 to present ===
Flybe, which operated 80% of flights at the airport, and carried over 1.6 million passengers across 14 routes, ceased operations in March 2020. Subsequently, Loganair commenced flights to Aberdeen, Glasgow, and Inverness, while Eastern Airways commenced flights to Cardiff and Southampton. In addition, British Airways subsidiary BA CityFlyer commenced flights to London City during 2020.

In August 2020, Aer Lingus subsidiary Aer Lingus Regional established a new base at the airport, operating five aircraft to six UK destinations. In June 2021, Aer Lingus Regional operator Stobart Air ceased operations, leading to the cancellation of all Aer Lingus Regional flights. Aer Lingus and British Airways commenced flights to the majority of Aer Lingus Regional's destinations from Belfast City Airport.

Ryanair resumed flying from the airport after a hiatus of around 11 years, on 1 June 2021, but announced in late August 2021 that it would withdraw from Northern Ireland altogether in September 2021, in protest at the UK's Air Passenger Duty, and the lack of post-Covid incentives for airlines.

In March 2022, Emerald Airlines, the new operator of Aer Lingus Regional flights, announced that they would be opening a base at the airport. Initially with a base of three ATR-72-600 aircraft, Emerald plan on serving six UK destinations from 24 March 2022 under the Aer Lingus brand, with Aer Lingus itself operating the London Heathrow route.

On 16 March 2022, the new Flybe announced that the airport would become their second operating base following their spring relaunch, with flights going on sale the following week. The base was closed in January 2023 when Flybe 2.0 went into administration.

In October 2022, it was announced that Aer Lingus operations between Belfast City and London Heathrow would transfer to Aer Lingus UK due to Brexit related requirements that a European carrier could no longer fly domestic routes within the United Kingdom. These flights are operated by British Airways under wet-lease terms using the Aer Lingus UK flight numbers and callsigns. This currently does not affect the operations carried out by Emerald Airlines from Belfast City as an agreement is currently in place between the UK CAA, British Airways and themselves prior to Emerald Airlines securing a UK AOC.

In July 2024, the airport launched an advertising campaign, new website, and logo featuring the name 'Belfast City Airport,' omitting 'George Best' from its branding. The airport later clarified that while the campaign excluded his name, the signage above the door remained unchanged, and its official business name and airport registration would continue as 'George Best Belfast City Airport'.

== Expansion plans and objections ==
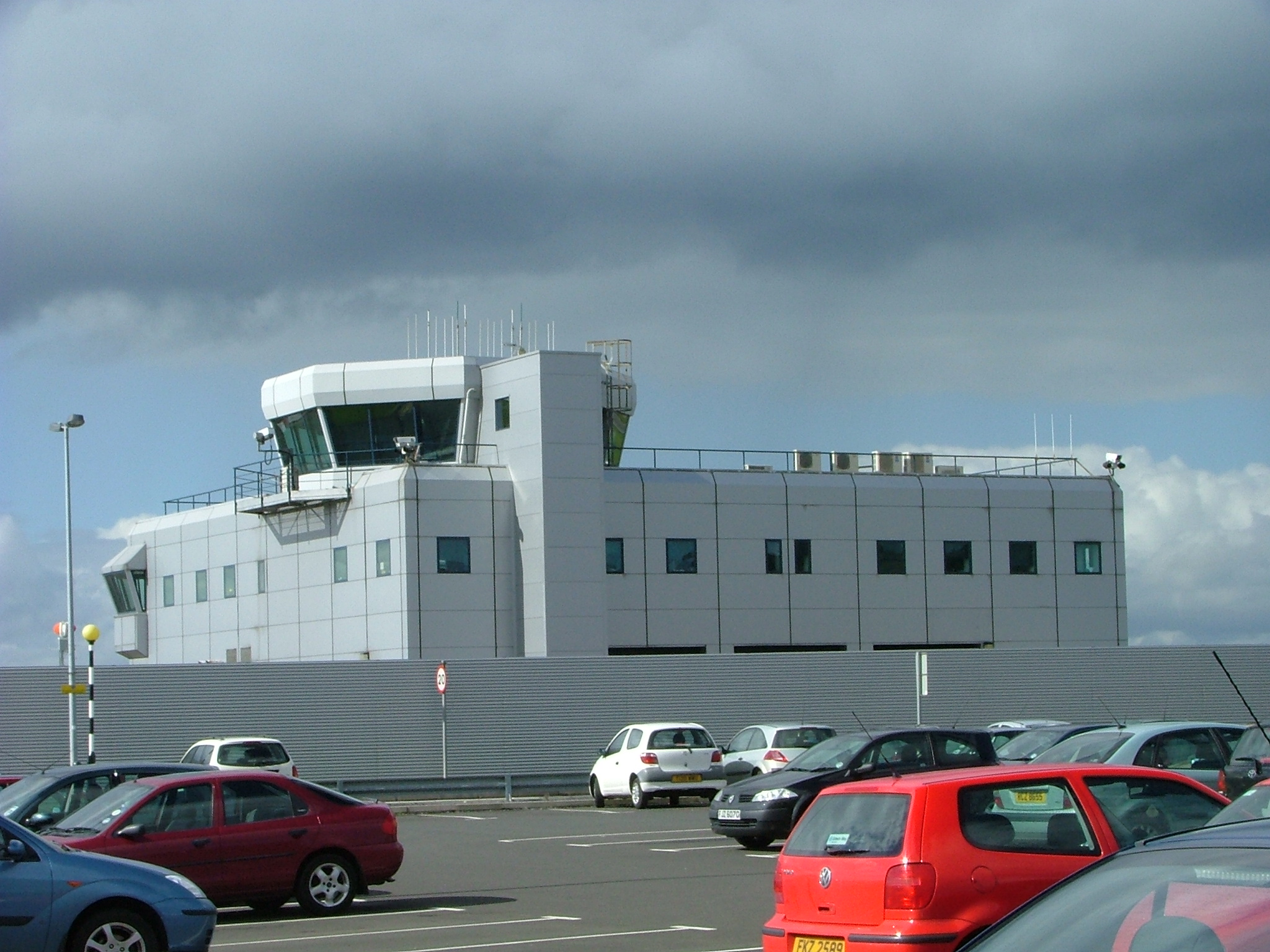
Control tower at Belfast City

As the airport is adjacent to residential areas, the issue of noise pollution is a major source of public debate. The airport has developed a noise management strategy following the making of a planning agreement, under which the airport operates, and has established operational noise abatement procedures.

The airport applied for a complete removal of the limit on the seats it could sell in 2013 – a key element of the 1997 planning agreement, which was designed to guard against over-expansion. As a result, numerous residents' groups formed a coalition – The Coalition Against Belfast City Airport Expansion – to protest against the airport's proposed expansion plans, and to represent the views of residents at the Examination in Public held during 2006.

Restrictions applied to the airport include:

- The requirement for flights to be scheduled between 6:30 am and 9:30 pm. The exception to this is for delayed flights where extensions until 11 pm may be granted.
- That there would be a limit of 45,000 commercial (and unlimited general aviation) aircraft movements in any year, restricted further in 2008 to 48,000 combined commercial and general aviation aircraft movements.
- That airlines must not offer more than 4 million seats for sale on flights from the airport per year.
- The majority of flights must approach and depart the airport over Belfast Lough (currently 52% as of April 2017), rather than over the city of Belfast.
- Any flight departing over the lough must turn left to head north (further from land) at 500 feet (150 m). Only after reaching 2,000 feet (610 m) (for turboprops) or 3,000 feet (910 m) (for jet aircraft) may they then turn south to move over land again.
- Any flight departing over the city must fly in a straight line until 2,000 feet (610 m) (for turboprop aircraft) or 3,000 feet (910 m) (for jet aircraft) before being allowed to turn.

== Airlines and destinations ==
The following airlines operate regular scheduled and charter flights to and from Belfast City Airport:

Airlines	Destinations
Aer Lingus	Birmingham, Cardiff, East Midlands, Edinburgh, Exeter, Glasgow, Leeds/Bradford, Manchester, Southampton; Seasonal: Newquay; Seasonal Charter: Verona
British Airways	London–City, London–Heathrow; Seasonal Charter: Bologna, Palma de Mallorca
EasyJet	Bristol, Edinburgh, Glasgow, Liverpool, London–Gatwick, London–Luton, London–Southend, Manchester; Seasonal: Palma de Mallorca
KLM	Amsterdam
Loganair	Aberdeen, Inverness, Kirkwall, (Note: Kirkwall service is a continuation of the Inverness service as the same flight number) Sumburgh (Note: Sumburgh service is a continuation of the Inverness service as the same flight number)

== Statistics ==
=== Busiest routes ===
10 busiest routes to and from Belfast City (2025)
Rank	Airport	Total passengers	Change 2024 / 25
1	London–Heathrow	606,756	▲4.6%
2	London–Gatwick	285,884	▲4.3%
3	Manchester	209,986	▼6.1%
4	Birmingham	201,768	▲8.0%
5	Leeds Bradford	130,756	▲3.6%
6	London–City	127,727	▲4.7%
7	Edinburgh	126,181	▼3.0%
8	Liverpool	106,819	▼10.4%
9	Glasgow	100,655	▼10.4%
10	Amsterdam	99,586	▲73.0%

== Ground transport ==
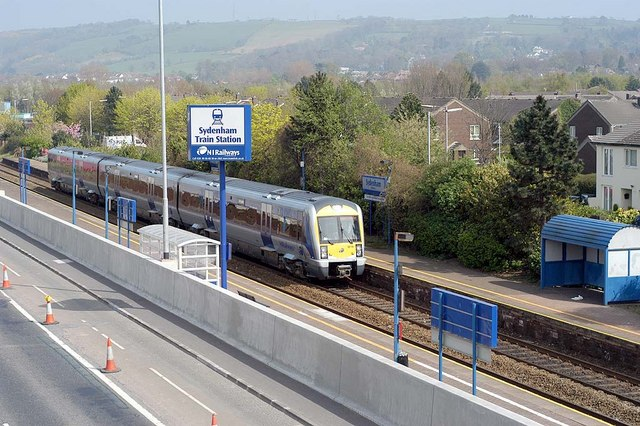
Regular train services operate into central Belfast.

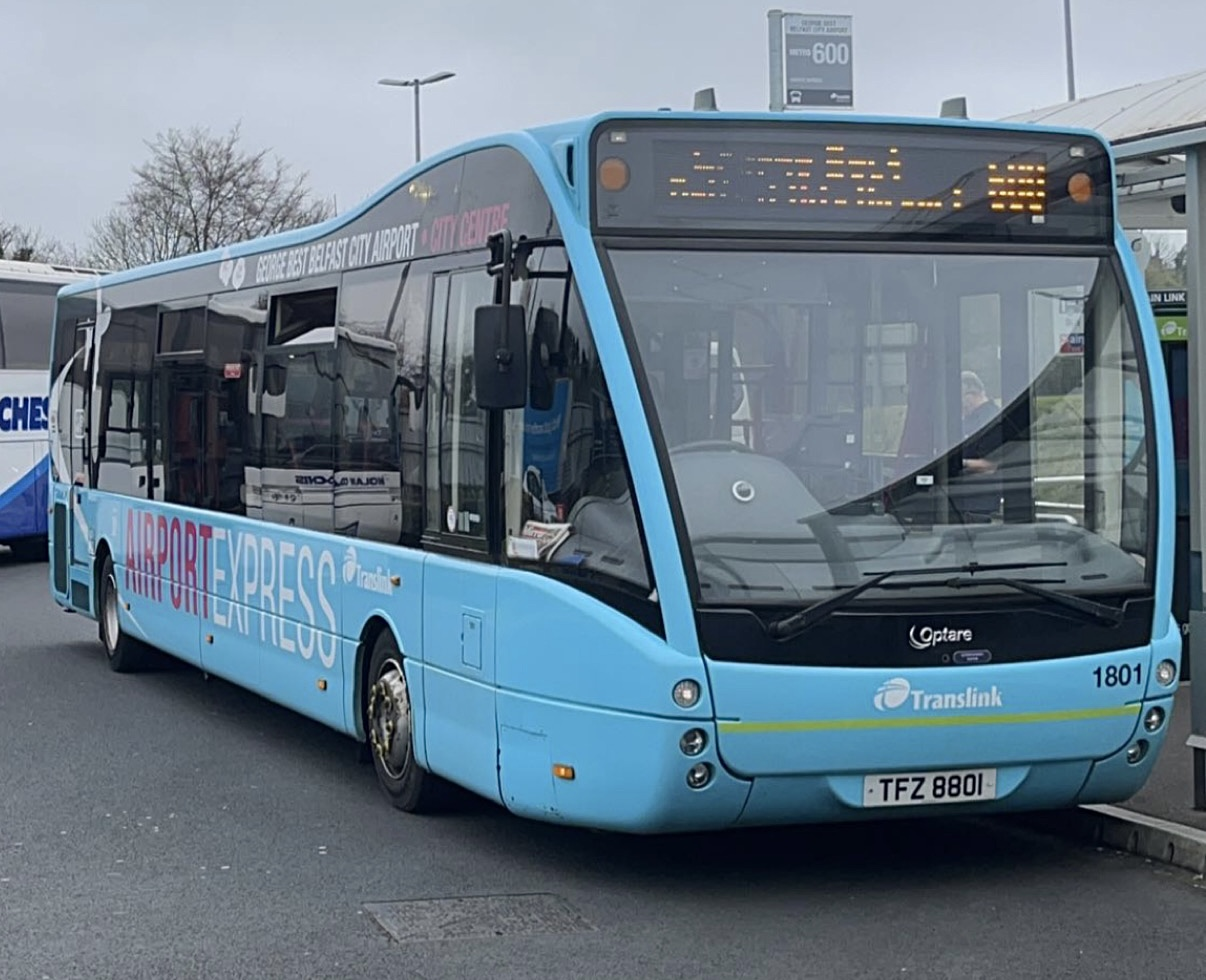
The 600a service from Europa Buscentre to the airport.

=== Rail ===
Sydenham railway station is adjacent to the southern perimeter of the airport, across the A2 from the old passenger terminal. It is served by frequent Northern Ireland Railways trains between Bangor and Belfast Grand Central. With the construction of the new passenger terminal further northeast, passengers arriving or departing by train can request an airport courtesy bus to take them to or from the terminal.

=== Car ===
The airport is located on the A2, Sydenham by-pass road between Belfast and Holywood.

=== Bus ===
Translink Metro route 600 is the Belfast City Airlink service, from the terminal to the Belfast Grand Central . Buses run every thirty minutes throughout the day. In addition Metro bus 3A operates every ten minutes from Sydenham to Belfast City Hall.
