= Air Ecosse =

Scottish commuter airline

IATA	ICAO	Call sign
EC	ECS	Air Ecosse
- Founded: June 1977
- Ceased operations: January 1987 (asserts sold to Malinair in 1987, and to Peregrine A.S. on 1 November 1988)
- Hubs: Aberdeen Airport
- Destinations: Scotland; Northern England
- Parent company: Fairflight Charters
- Headquarters: Aberdeen, Scotland, UK

Air Ecosse was a Scottish commuter airline based in Aberdeen operating in the late 1970s to late 1980s. They flew between Aberdeen and cities in northern England, such as Liverpool and Carlisle as well as to Edinburgh and Glasgow. They also carried out mail flights for the Royal Mail.

== History ==
Air Ecosse (Charters) Ltd. was formed in June 1977 as a subsidiary of Fairflight Charters based at Biggin Hill (Kent - England). The company's first flight was in July 1977 and until 1981 only on-demand flights were operated.

After the company name was changed to simply Air Ecosse Ltd. the first scheduled flights started in 1981 from Aberdeen to Dundee, Glasgow, Manchester, Wick and Sumburgh. In the 1980s, the airline started flights to other destinations such as Edinburgh, Liverpool and Carlisle. On April 4, 1983 it inaugurated schedules to London Heathrow airport, becoming the first Scottish commuter airline to serve the capital. The airline also started flights for the Royal Mail with Short 360. By 1985 the company had 165 employees.

All flight operations were discontinued on January 19, 1987. Shortly thereafter the assets were sold to Malinair and, in November of the following year, to Peregrine Air Services (which was named after the famous bird of prey with the same name).

== Air Ecosse fleet gallery ==
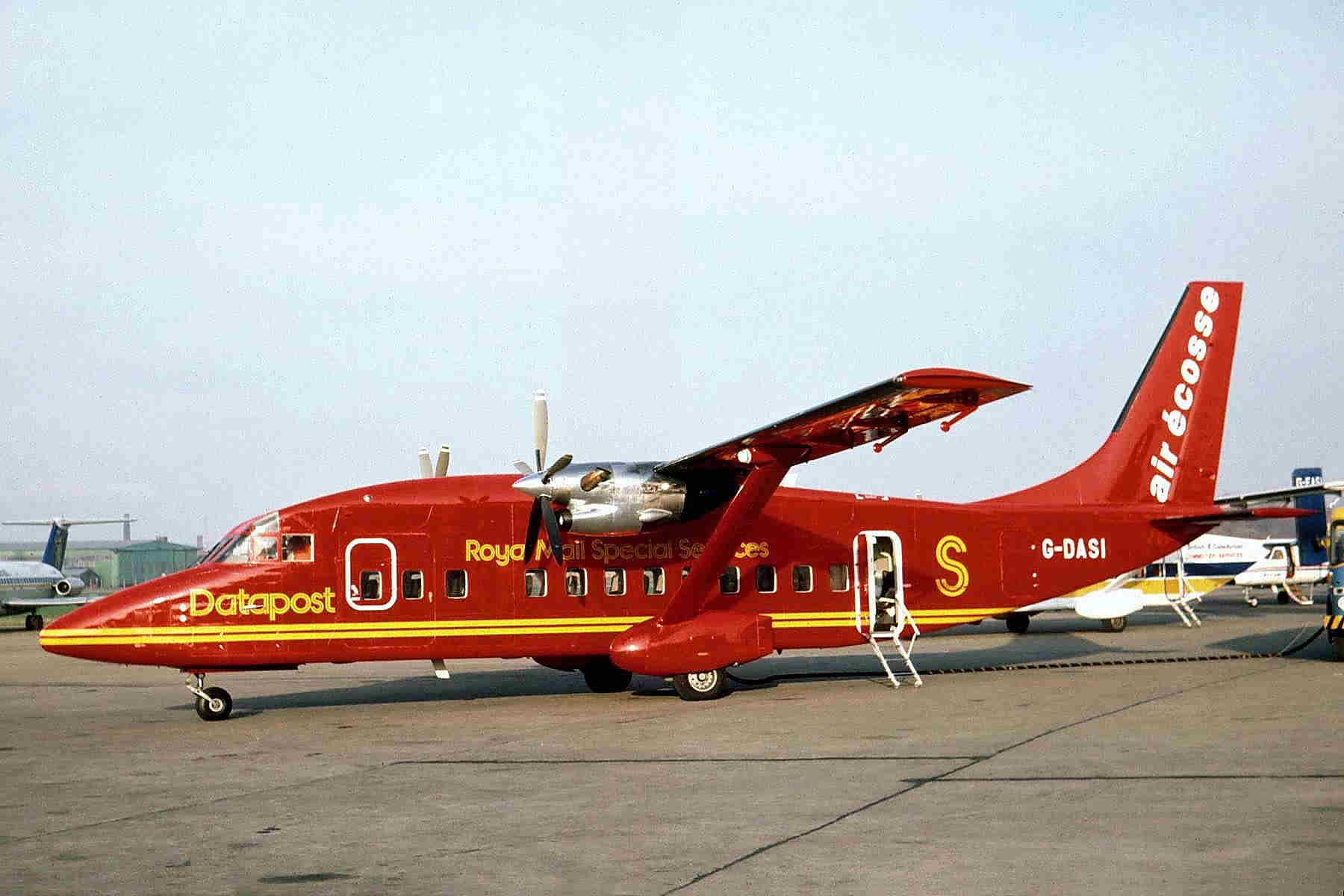
Short 360 in Datapost colours

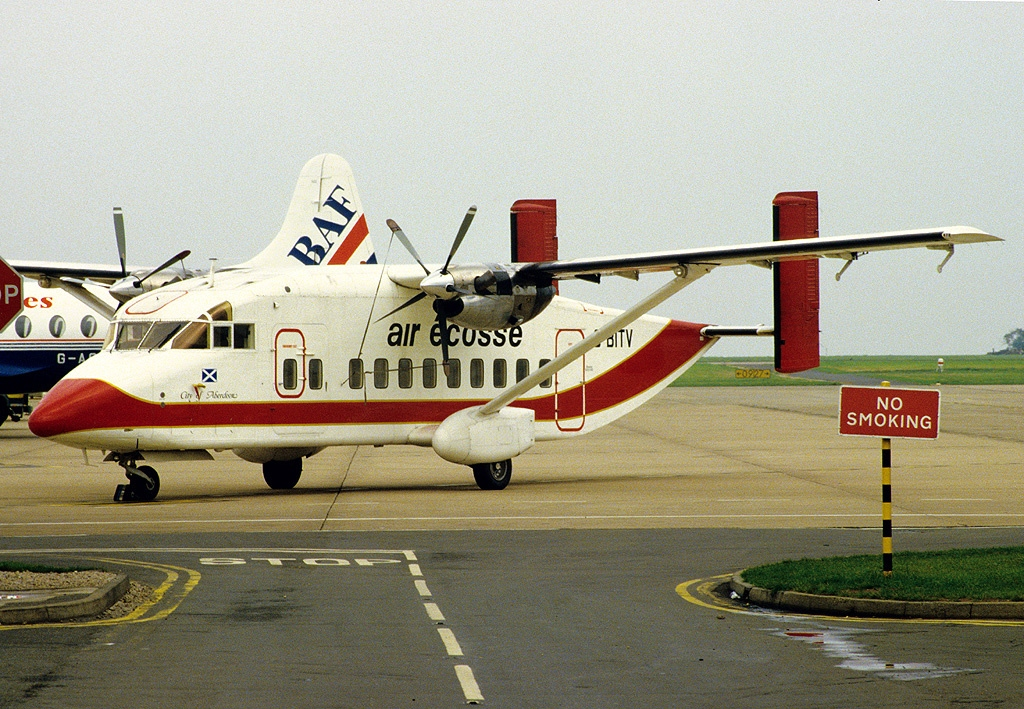
Short 330-200

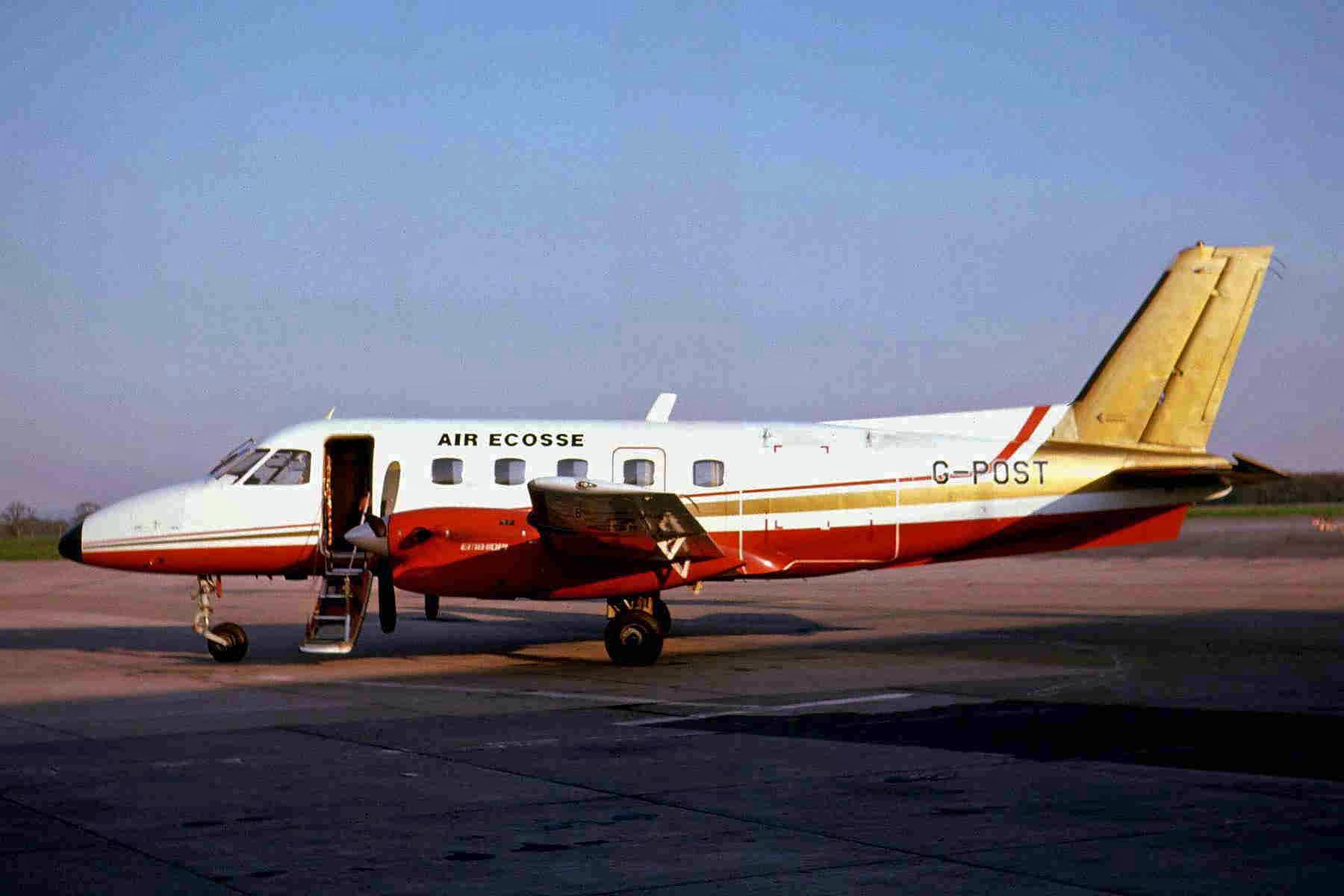
EMB-110 Bandeirante

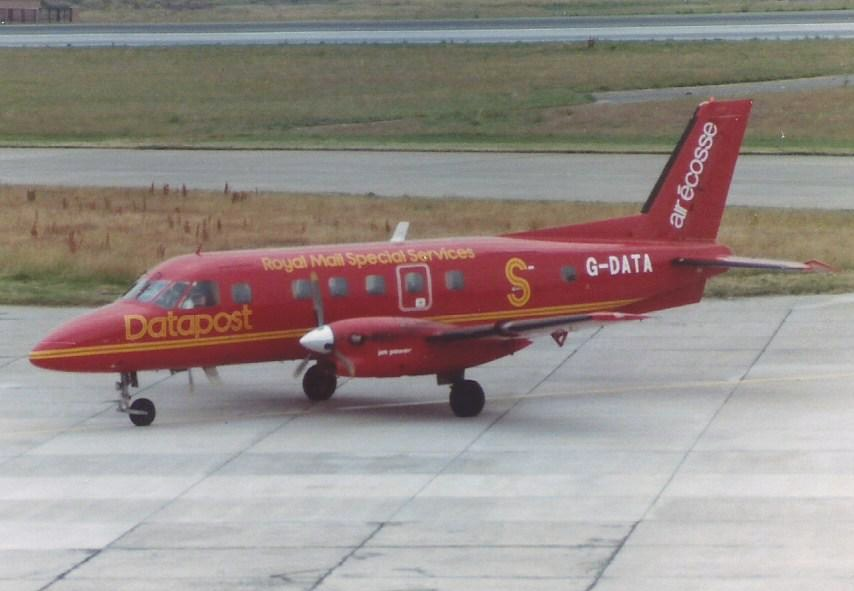
EMB-110 Bandeirante in Datapost colours

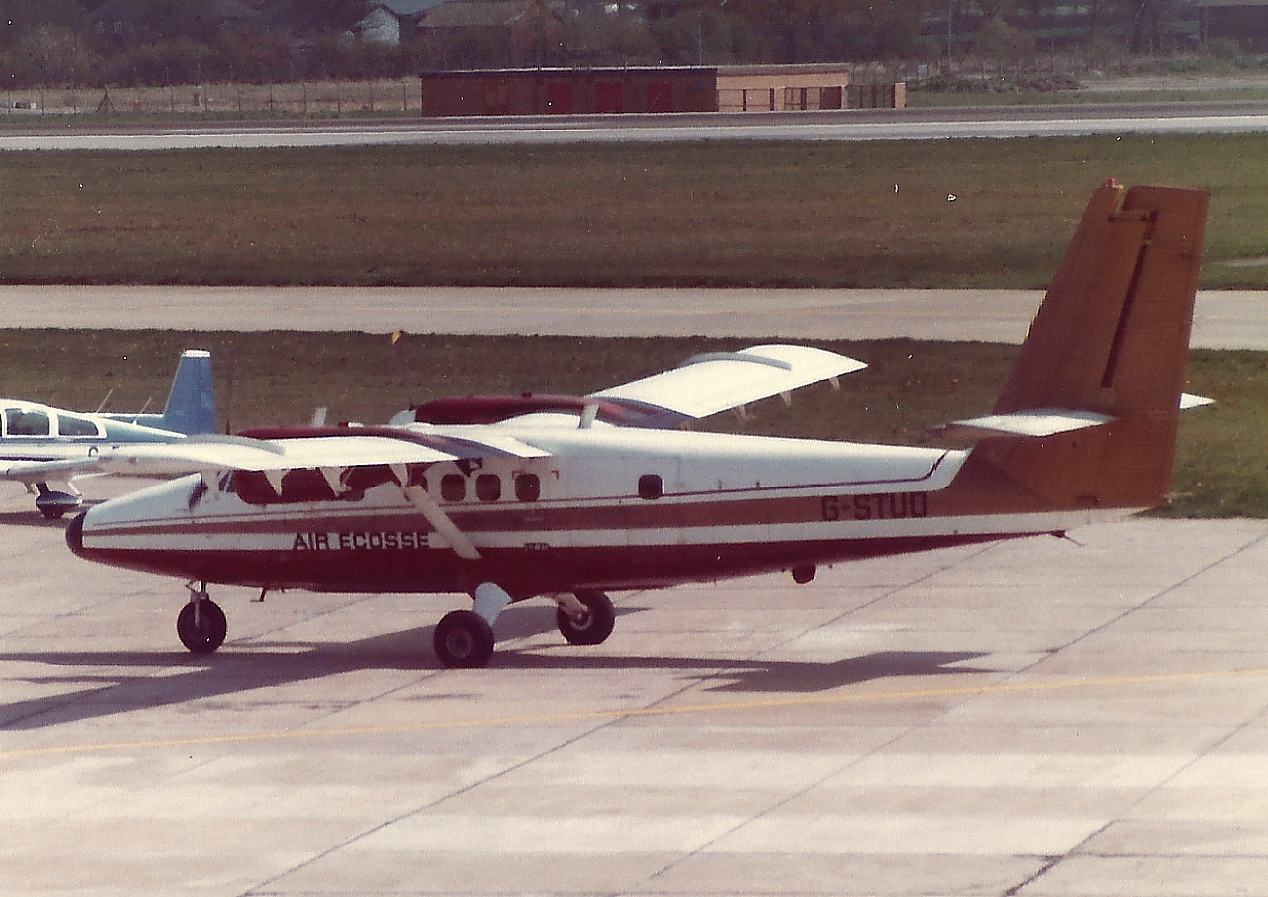
DHC 6 Twin Otter

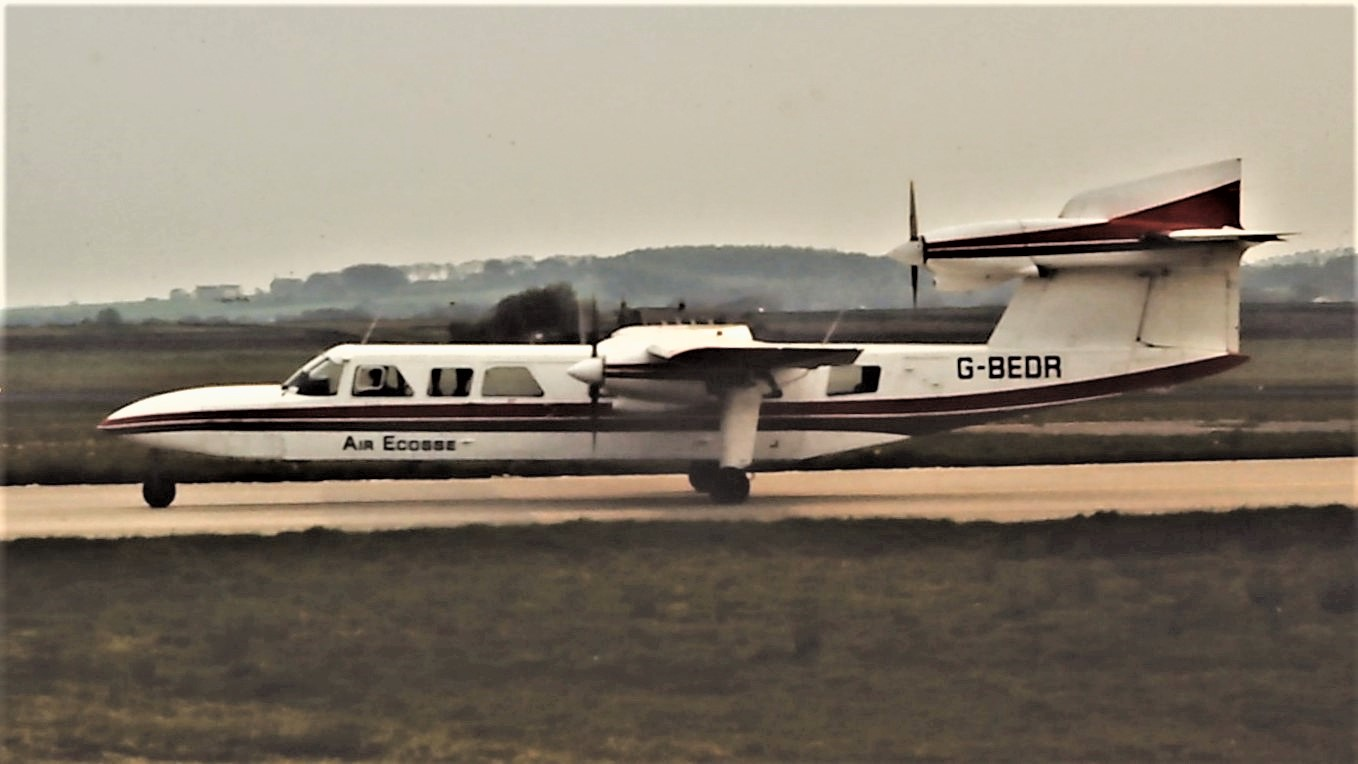
Britten-Norman Trislander

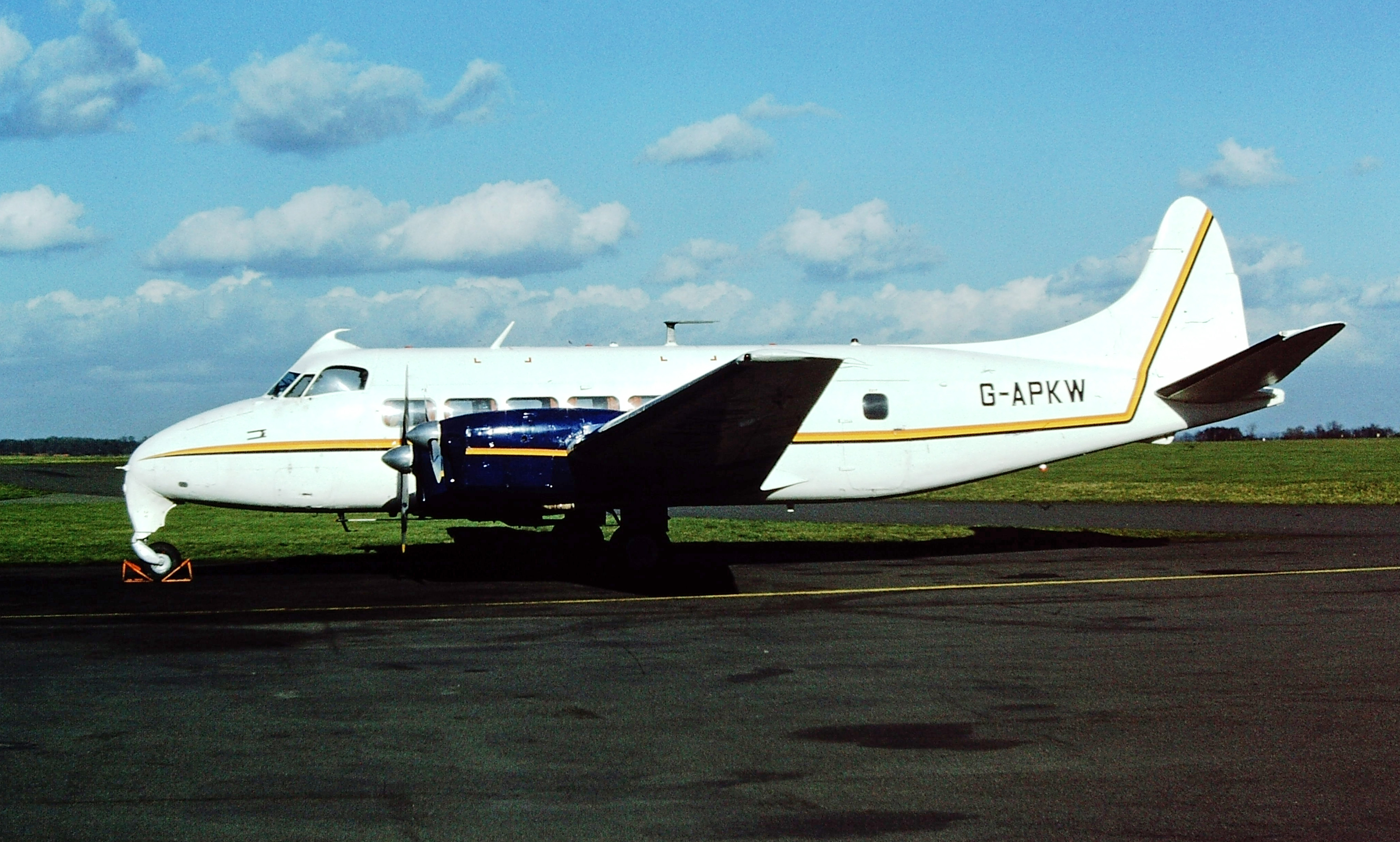
DH.114 Heron

== Aberdeen Airways ==
Aberdeen Airways
IATA	ICAO	Call sign
SM	AAW	Granite
- Founded: 7 March 1989
- Commenced operations: March 1989
- Ceased operations: 1992
- Parent company: Peregrine Air Services

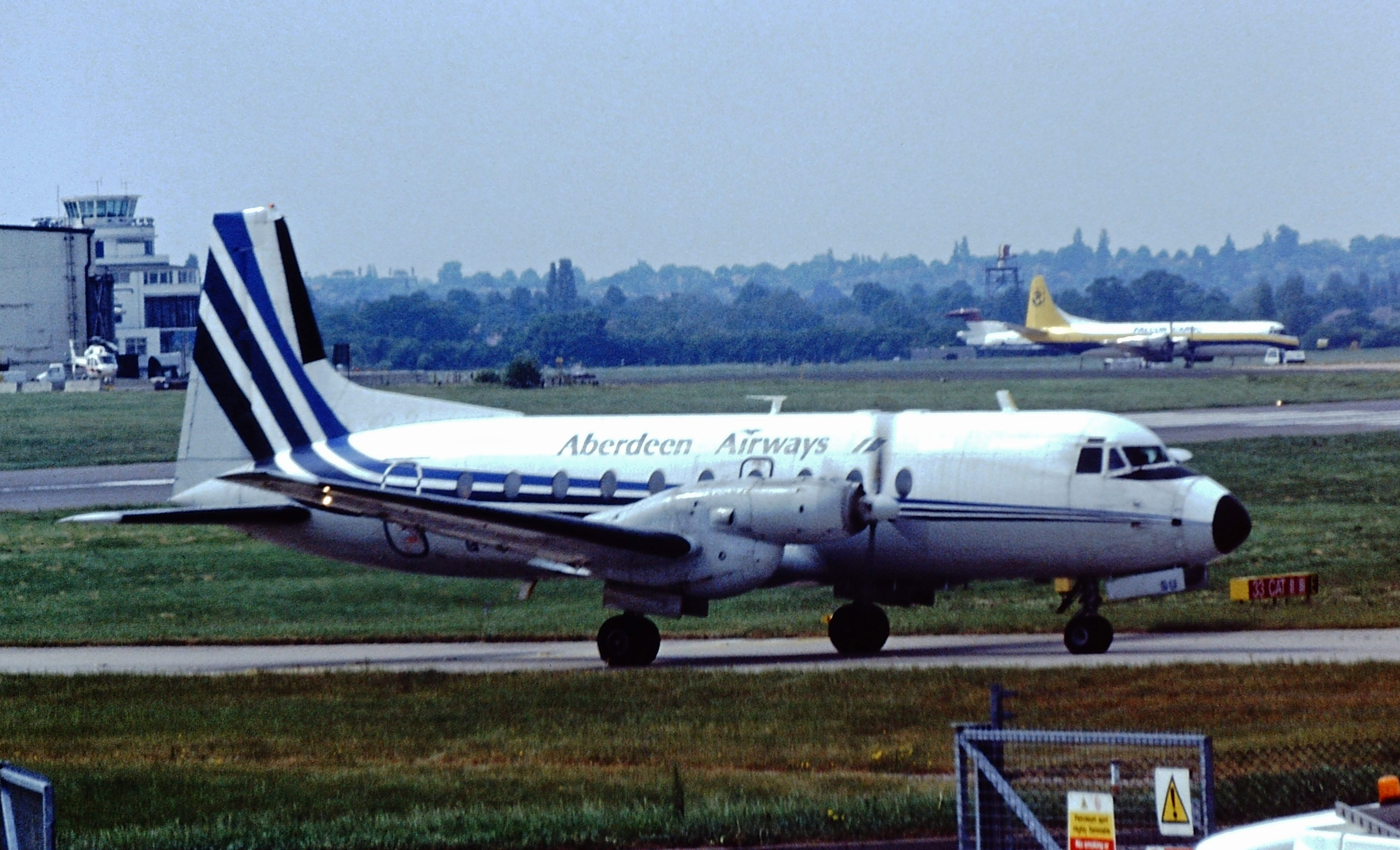
HS.748

Aberdeen Airways was established on 7 March 1989 by merging some of the assets of Air Ecosse and Malinair, starting flight activities a few days later. It initially operated as the scheduled division of Peregrine Air Service, but on 11 February 1991 it became a subsidiary of the French airline Air Provence. Aberdeen Airways subsequently also filed for bankruptcy protection, moved to East Midlands (EMA) and finally ended operations in summer 1992. It was declared bankrupt in the following month of November.

== Destinations ==
Denmark

- Esbjerg Airport

England

- Barrow/Walney Island Airport
- Blackpool Airport
- Carlisle Airport
- East Midlands Airport
- Gatwick Airport
- Heathrow Airport
- Humberside Airport
- Leeds Bradford Airport
- Liverpool Airport
- Manchester Airport
- Norwich Airport
- Teesside International Airport

Faroe Islands

- Vagar Airport

Northern Ireland

- Belfast International Airport

Scotland

- Aberdeen Airport
- Dundee Airport
- Edinburgh Airport
- Glasgow Airport
- Prestwick Airport
- Sumburgh Airport
- Wick Airport

The Republic of Ireland

- Cork Airport
- Dublin Airport
- Shannon Airport

== Fleet ==
Air Ecosse had the following aircraft in their fleet at the time that operations ceased;

- Britten-Norman Trislander
- DHC-6 Twin Otter
- Embraer EMB-110 Bandeirante
- Handley Page HPR-7 Herald 209
- Short 330-200
- Short 360

== See also ==
- List of defunct airlines of the United Kingdom
