= List of Boeing 707 operators =

This is a list of Boeing 707 operators.

== Current military/government operators ==
Chile

- Chilean Air Force
  - 10th Aviation Group operates two 707-based E-3 Sentry AWACS, with a third in reserve for spare parts.
  - Previously, it operated four Boeing 707s, two of which were selected for conversion. One was converted to a tanker configuration called KC-707 Águila, retired in 2006, and the other was converted to a unique AEW&C configuration called EC-707 Cóndor, operated from 1995 until its retirement in 2022.

India

- Indian Air Force

Iran

- Iranian Air Force

Israel

- Israeli Air Force

United States

- United States Air Force (Operates 707-based E-3 AWACS)
- United States Navy (Operates 707-based E-6 TACAMO)

Venezuela

- Venezuelan Air Force

== Former military/government operators ==
Angola

- National Air Force of Angola

Argentina

- Argentine Air Force / LADE

Australia

- Royal Australian Air Force
  - No. 33 Squadron RAAF
  - No. 37 Squadron RAAF

Benin

- Benin Air Force

Canada

- Royal Canadian Air Force
  - Canadian Forces Air Command – Military

Colombia

- Colombian Air Force operated one aircraft in a tanker configuration

Egypt

- Egyptian Air Force operated three ex-Egypt Air Boeing 707-366Cs

Germany

- West German Air Force/German Air Force
  - German Air Force executive Transport Wing

Indonesia

- Indonesian Air Force

Italy

- Italian Air Force operated 4 aircraft from 1991 to 2005

Mali

- Malian Air Force

Nepal

- Nepalese Army

Morocco

- Moroccan Air Force operated two aircraft, including one converted to a tanker configuration

Pakistan

- Pakistan Air Force

Paraguay

- Paraguayan Air Force

Peru

- Peruvian Air Force operated one aircraft in a tanker configuration

Philippines

- Philippine Presidential Aircraft

Portugal

- Portuguese Air Force

Romania

- Romanian Government (Romavia)

Saudi Arabia

- Royal Saudi Air Force
- Saudi Arabian Royal Flight

South Africa

- South African Air Force

Spain

- Spanish Air Force operated four Boeing 707s — two tankers, one cargo aircraft and one configured for electronic warfare. The final one was retired on 3 October 2016

== Current commercial/other operators ==
- United States
  - Omega Aerial Refueling Services

== Former commercial/other operators ==
=== Africa ===
- Algeria
  - Air Algérie
- Angola
  - Angola Air Charter
  - TAAG Angola Airlines
- Democratic Republic of the Congo
  - Air Congo
  - Global Airways
  - Hewa Bora Airways
  - Kinshasa Airways
- Egypt
  - Egyptair
  - ZAS Airline of Egypt
- Ethiopia
  - Ethiopian Airlines
- Gambia
  - Mahfooz Aviation
- Ghana
  - Cargoplus Aviation
- Ivory Coast
  - Air Afrique
- Kenya
  - Kenya Airways
  - Simba Air Cargo (SMB)
- Libya
  - Johnsons Air (JON)
  - Libyan Arab Airlines
- Mauritius
  - Air Mauritius
- Morocco
  - Royal Air Maroc
- Mozambique
  - LAM Mozambique Airlines
- Nigeria
  - ADC Airlines
  - Nigeria Airways
- Rhodesia
  - Air Rhodesia
- Seychelles
  - Air Seychelles
- Somalia
  - Somali Airlines
- South Africa
  - South African Airways
  - Trek Airways
- Sudan
  - Sudan Air
  - Air West
  - Azza Transport
  - Trans Arabian Air Transport
- Uganda
  - Uganda Airlines
- Zaire
  - Air Zaire
- Zambia
  - Aero Zambia
  - Zambia Airways
- Zimbabwe
  - Air Zimbabwe

=== Americas ===
- Argentina
  - Aerolíneas Argentinas
- Bolivia
  - Lloyd Aéreo Boliviano
- Brazil
  - Skymaster Airlines
  - Transbrasil
  - Varig
  - Beta Cargo
  - Phoenix Brasil
  - VASP
- Canada
  - Pacific Western Airlines
  - Quebecair
  - Transair
  - Wardair
- Chile
  - Ladeco
  - LAN Chile
- Colombia
  - Aerocondor
  - AeroTal
  - Avianca
  - SAM Colombia
- Ecuador
  - Aeca Carga
  - Ecuatoriana de Aviación
  - SAETA
- Guyana
  - Guyana Airways
- Panama
  - Copa Airlines
- Paraguay
  - Líneas Aéreas Paraguayas
- Puerto Rico
  - Aeronaves de Puerto Rico
- Suriname
  - Surinam Airways
- Trinidad and Tobago
  - British West Indian Airways (BWIA)
- United States
  - Aeroamerica
  - Air Florida
  - Alaska Airlines
  - American Airlines
  - American Eagle – Air charter operator not affiliated with American Airlines
  - American Trans Air
  - Braniff International Airways
  - Continental Airlines
  - Global International Airways
  - Northeast Airlines
  - Northwest Airlines
  - Pan American World Airways
  - Perfect Air Tours
  - Ports of Call Travel Club
  - Skystar International Airlines
  - South Pacific Island Airways
  - Southeast Airlines
  - Standard Airways
  - Trans World Airlines
  - Western Airlines

=== Asia ===
- Bangladesh
  - Biman Bangladesh Airlines
- Hong Kong
  - Cathay Pacific
- India
  - Air India
- Indonesia
  - Bayu Indonesia
  - Bouraq Indonesia Airlines
  - Garuda Indonesia
  - Merpati Nusantara Airlines
  - Merpati Nusantara Airlines Cargo
  - Pelita Air - transferred to Indonesian Air Force
- Iran
  - Iran Air
  - Saha Airlines
- Iraq
  - Iraqi Airways
- Israel
  - El Al
  - MAOF
- Jordan
  - Royal Jordanian
- Kuwait
  - Kuwait Airways
- Lebanon
  - Middle East Airlines
  - Trans Mediterranean Airways
- Malaysia/Singapore
  - Malaysia-Singapore Airlines
- Malaysia
  - Malaysia Airlines
  - Sabah Air
- Pakistan
  - Pakistan International Airlines
- China
  - Air China
  - China Southwest Airlines
- Philippines
  - Philippine Airlines
  - Air Manila International
- Saudi Arabia
  - Saudia
- Sharjah
  - ADCO Airlines
- Singapore
  - Singapore Airlines
  - Singapore Airlines Cargo
- Republic of Korea
  - Korean Air
- South Vietnam
  - Air Vietnam
- Sri Lanka
  - Air Ceylon
  - Air Lanka
- Syria
  - Syrian Air
- Republic of China
  - China Airlines
- Thailand
  - Air Siam
- United Arab Emirates
  - Dolphin Air
  - Gulf Falcon
- Vietnam
  - Vietnam Airlines

=== Europe ===
- Austria
  - Austrian Airlines
  - Montana Austria
- Azerbaijan
  - Azerbaijan Airlines
- Belgium
  - Abelag Airways
  - Sabena
  - Sobelair
  - Trans European Airlines
- Denmark
  - Conair
- Cyprus
  - Cyprus Airways
- France
  - Air France
- Greece
  - Olympic Airways
- Hungary
  - Malév Hungarian Airlines
- Ireland
  - Aer Lingus
- Luxembourg
  - Luxair
- Malta
  - Air Malta
- Netherlands
  - Transavia Holland
- Norway
  - Trans Polar
- Portugal
  - Air Atlantis
  - TAP Air Portugal
- Romania
  - TAROM
- Turkey
  - Turkish Airlines
  - Boğaziçi Hava Transport
  - Birgenair
- United Kingdom
  - Anglo Cargo
  - BEA Airtours
  - BOAC
  - BOAC-Cunard
  - Britannia Airways
  - British Airtours
  - British Airways
  - British Caledonian Airways
  - British Cargo Airlines
  - British Eagle
  - British Midland
  - Caledonian Airways
  - Cunard Eagle Airways
  - Dan Air Services
  - Donaldson International Airways
  - Heavylift Cargo Airlines
  - Invicta International Airlines
  - Laker Airways
  - Lloyd International Airways
  - Monarch Airlines
  - Scimitar Airlines
  - Tradewinds Airways
- West Germany
  - Air Commerz
  - Condor
  - Deutsche Lufthansa
  - Paninternational
- Yugoslavia
  - Air Yugoslavia
  - JAT Yugoslav Airlines

=== Oceania ===
- Australia
  - Qantas
- Papua New Guinea
  - Air Niugini
