= List of Vickers Viscount operators =

The following is a list of past and present operators of the Vickers Viscount.

== Civil operators ==
♠ Original operators

- (Canada) 318975 Ontario Ltd.
- (Canada) 515489 Ontario Ltd
- (Australia) ASS - Australian Aircraft Sales (NSW) Pty Ltd
- (Aden Colony) Aden Airways
- (Republic of Ireland) Aer Lingus ♠
- (Venezuela) Aeropostal
- (Brazil) Aero Clube de São Paulo
- (Brazil) Aero Clube Rio Claro
- (United States) Aero Flite Inc.
- (United States) Aero Jet Services Inc.
- (Mexico) Aero Sierra de Durango S.A.
- Aeroclube de Brazil
- (Colombia) Aeroelectronica
- (Mexico) Aeroeslava
- (Canada) Aeroleasing & Sales Ltd
- (Spain) Aerolineas Condor
- (Mexico) Aerolineas Republica
- (Colombia) Aerolineas TAO
- (United Kingdom) Aeropark
- Aeropesca Colombia
- (Colombia) Aerovias del Cesar (Aerocesar Columbia)
- (Algeria) Air Algerie
- (United Kingdom) Air Anglia
- Air Botswana
- (United Kingdom) Air Bridge Carriers
- Air Canada ♠
- (Canada) Air Caravane
- (Germany) Air Commerz
- (United Kingdom) Air Ferry
- Air France ♠
- (France) Air Inter
- (United Kingdom) Air International UK
- Air Malawi
- (Gabon) Air Ogooue
- Air Rhodesia
- (United Kingdom) Airwork Services ♠
- (United Kingdom) Alidair
- (Italy) Alitalia ♠
- (Japan) All Nippon Airways ♠
- (United States) Aloha Airlines
- (Australia) Ansett ♠
- (Israel) Arkia Airlines
- (United States) Atlantic Gulf Airlines
- (Austria) Austrian Airlines ♠
- (The Bahamas) Bahamas Airways
- (United Kingdom) BKS Air Transport
- (Norway) Braathens SAFE
- (United Kingdom) British Air Ferries
- (United Kingdom) British Airways
- (United Kingdom) British Eagle
- (United Kingdom) British European Airways ♠
- (United Kingdom) British Midland
- (United Kingdom) British Overseas Airways Corporation (BOAC)
- (United Kingdom) British United Airways
- (Trinidad and Tobago) British West Indian Airways (BWIA) ♠
- (United Kingdom) British World Airlines
- Bouraq Indonesia Airlines
- (Australia) Butler Air Transport ♠
- (China) CAAC Airlines ♠
- (United Kingdom) Cambrian Airways
- (United States) Capital Airlines ♠
- (Federation of Rhodesia and Nyasaland) Central African Airways ♠
- (United Kingdom) Channel Airways
- (Germany) Condor Flugdienst
- (United States) Continental Airlines ♠
- (Cuba) Cubana ♠
- Cyprus Airways
- (United Kingdom) Dan-Air
- (United Kingdom) Eagle Airways ♠
- (United Kingdom) Euroair Transport
- (Equatorial Guinea) Ecuato Guineana de Aviación
- (Taiwan) Far Eastern Air Transport
- (Norway) Fred. Olsen Airtransport ♠
- Ghana Airways ♠
- (United Kingdom) Guernsey Airlines
- (United States) Hawaiian Airlines
- (British Hong Kong) Hong Kong Airways ♠
- (United Kingdom) Hunting Clan ♠
- Icelandair (As Air Iceland)
- (India) Indian Airlines ♠
- (United Kingdom) Intra Airways
- (United Kingdom) Invicta International Airlines
- Iran Air ♠
- (Iraq) Iraqi Airways ♠
- (Italy) Istituto tecnico De Pinedo Colonna
- (United Kingdom) Janus Airways
- (United Kingdom) Kestrel Airways
- (Netherlands) KLM ♠
- Kuwait Airways
- (Poland) LOT Polish Airlines (3 in 1962-1967)
- (Spain) Líneas Aéreas Canarias
- (Nicaragua) LANICA
- (Venezuela) Línea Aeropostal Venezolana (LAV) ♠
- (United Kingdom) London European Airways
- (Germany) Lufthansa ♠
- (Australia) MacRobertson Miller Airlines
- (United Kingdom) Maitland Drewery Aviation
- (Federation of Malaya) Malayan Airways
- (Indonesia) Mandala Airlines
- (United Kingdom) Manx Airlines
- (Canada) Maritime Central Airways
- (Indonesia) Merpati Nusantara Airlines
- (Lebanon) Middle East Airlines (MEA) ♠
- (Egypt) Misrair - United Arab Airlines ♠
- (New Zealand) National Airways Corporation ♠
- (United Kingdom) Northeast Airlines
- (United States) Northeast Airlines ♠
- Pakistan International Airlines ♠
- (Philippines) Philippine Airlines ♠
- (United Kingdom) Progressive Airways
- (Uruguay) PLUNA ♠
- (United States) Royal American Airways
- (Ecuador) SAETA (Sociedad Anónima Ecuatoriana de Transportes Aéreos)
- (United Kingdom) Silver City Airways
- (New Zealand) Skybus
- (Somalia) Somali Airlines
- (South Africa) South African Airways ♠
- (United Kingdom) Southern International
- (United Kingdom) Starways
- Sudan Airways ♠
- (United States) TAO
- Transair (Canada)
- (United Kingdom) Transair (UK)
- Transporte Aéreo de Colombia ♠
- (El Salvador) TACA International Airlines (TACA)
- Trans Australia Airlines (TAA) ♠
- Trans Canada Air Lines (TCA)
- (Turkey) Turkish Airlines (THY) ♠
- (Brazil) VASP ♠
- (Myanmar) Union of Burma Airways ♠
- (United States) United Airlines
- (United Kingdom) Virgin Atlantic
- Zambia Airways

== Military operators ==
♠ Original operators

Australia

- Royal Australian Air Force
  - No. 34 Squadron RAAF - Two Type 839s bought in 1964 with VIP interior, sold in 1969.

Brazil

- Brazilian Air Force ♠ - One Type 742 delivered in November 1956 and one Type 789 December 1957 both with VIP interior. The Type 742 was damaged beyond repair in a heavy landing in 1967, the Type 789 was withdrawn from use in 1970.

China

- People's Liberation Army Air Force - One Type 734 bought from Pakistan in 1970, two Type 843s transferred from Civil Aviation Administration of China in 1983.

India

- Indian Air Force ♠ - One Type 723 delivered in December 1955 and one Type 730 in January 1956, both aircraft identical apart from slight differences in VIP interiors, both sold in 1967.

Oman

- Sultan of Oman Air Force - Two Type 816s bought in 1971, two Type 814s bought in 1972 and two Type 808s bought in 1973. One Type 808 crashed on delivery and the five survivors were all sold between 1976 and 1979.

Pakistan

- Pakistan Air Force ♠ - One Type 734 delivered in March 1956 with VIP interior. Sold to Chinese Air Force in 1970.

South Africa

- South African Air Force
  - No. 21 Squadron SAAF ♠ - One Type 781 delivered in June 1958 with VIP interior.

Turkey

- Turkish Air Force - Two Type 794Ds bought in 1971 with another bought in 1972.

United Kingdom

- Empire Test Pilots School - One Type 744 and one Type 745 bought in 1962 and withdrawn from use in 1971 and 1972.
- Royal Radar Establishment - One Type 837 bought in 1964 and one Type 838 bought in 1965.

== Corporate and government operators ==
The Viscount was also operated by corporate operators particularly in the United States, the following bought the aircraft new:

- (Canada) Canadian Department of Transport ♠ - One Type 737 delivered in March 1955. was followed by a Type 797 in 1957
- (Iran) Iranian Government ♠ - One Type 839 delivered in May 1961
- (United States) Standard Oil Company ♠ - One Type 765 delivered in 1957.
- United States Steel Corporation ♠ - Three Type 764s delivered in 1956.
- (United States) Union Carbide ♠ - One Type 839 delivered in 1959.
