= Eric Blackwood =

Canadian aviator (1921–2007)

Eric W. Blackwood (December 7, 1921 – 2007) was a Canadian aviator. A noted navigator, during World War II, serving in both the Royal Canadian Air Force and the Royal Air Force, Blackwood is the founder of Eastern Provincial Airways. In the early days of EPA, Blackwood acted as pilot, operations manager and director.

Blackwood was born in Brookfield, Bonavista Bay, Newfoundland. He was educated at Wesleyville and went on to Prince of Wales College at St. John's. He joined the air force in 1942. In 1945 he formed Newfoundland Aero Sales and Services Inc. with James McLoughlin and Ren Goobie. Newfoundland Aero Sales and Service was eventually sold to Maritime Central Airways in 1949. Then on March 10, 1949, Blackwood founded Eastern Provincial Airways with a single plane, a Twin 50 Cessna.

Blackwood died in 2007.

Timeline for EPA

- 1949: Eastern Provincial Airways (charters), St John's Newfoundland
- 1961: Scheduled flights to Greenland begun.
- 1963: Acquired Maritime Central Airways.
- 1982: Subsidiary Air Maritime.
- 1983: Headquarter operations moved from Gander to Halifax.
- 1984: Merged with Canadian Pacific Air Lines.

== See also ==
- List of people of Newfoundland and Labrador
- List of communities in Newfoundland and Labrador
