= Handley Page Dart Herald =

1950s British turboprop passenger aircraft

HPR.7 Dart Herald
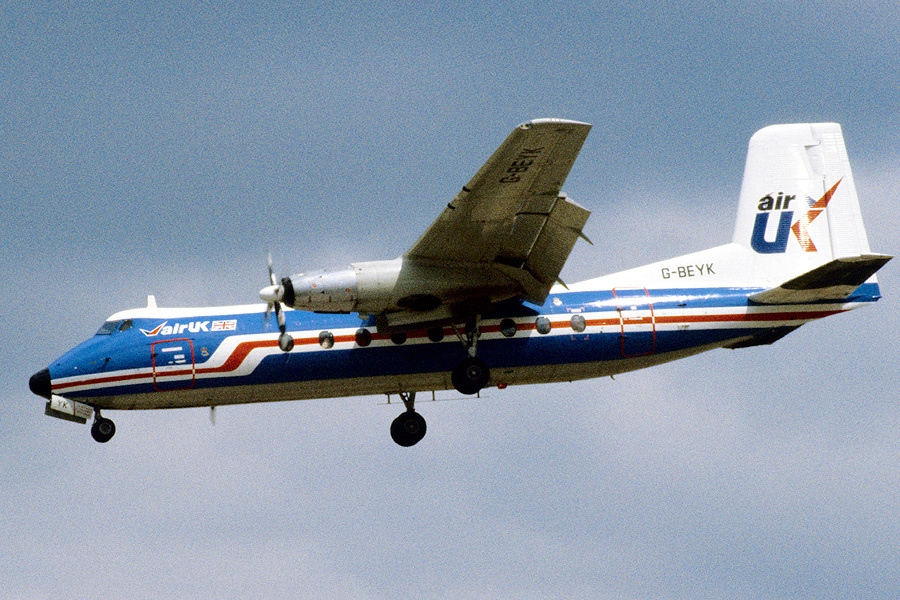
- Handley Page Herald of Air UK

General information
- Type: Turboprop airliner
- National origin: United Kingdom
- Manufacturer: Handley Page (Reading)
- Status: Retired
- Number built: 50

History
- Manufactured: 1959–1968
- First flight: 25 August 1955
- Retired: 1987 (passenger); 1999 (commercial)

The Handley Page HPR.7 Dart Herald is a British turboprop passenger aircraft, designed in the 1950s as a DC-3 replacement, but only entering service in the 1960s by which time it faced stiff competition from Fokker (F27 Friendship) and Avro (Avro/Hawker Siddeley HS748). Sales were disappointing, contributing in part to the demise of Handley Page in 1970.

== Design and development ==
In the mid-1950s Handley Page developed a new fast short-range regional airliner, intended to replace the older Douglas DC-3, particularly in third-world countries. The design, originally known as the HPR.3 Herald, emanated from the drawing office at Handley Page (Reading) Limited—the former Miles Aircraft factory site, which had developed an earlier airliner design, the Miles Marathon. The Herald was an extensive re-development of the original concept of the Marathon, notable for its high mounted wing. Handley Page Reading succeeded in producing a modern design with excellent flight and performance characteristics. However, the company made a serious misjudgement which was, in the end, to cost the company dearly, and like some other classic British aircraft of the time, the Herald missed its chance.

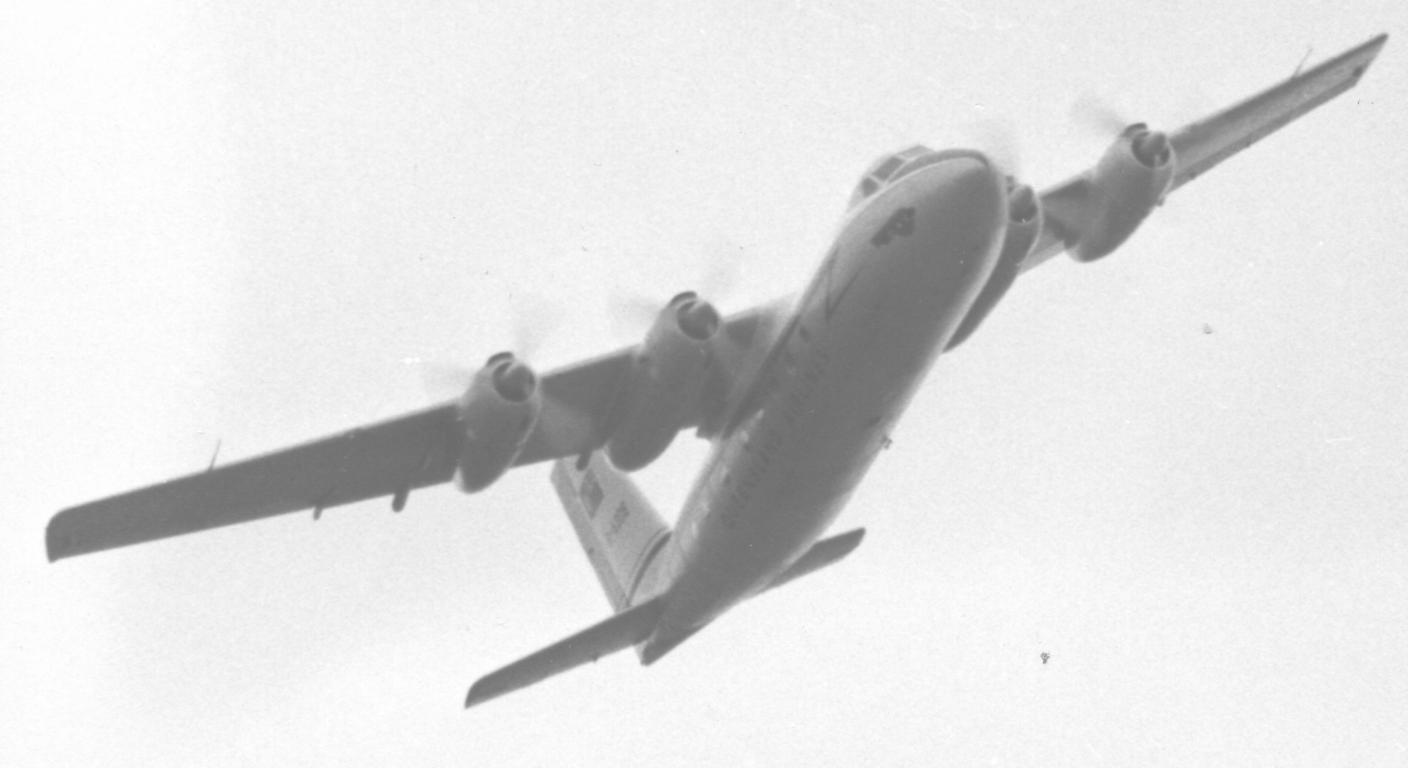
The HPR.3 Herald prototype with four Alvis Leonides Major engines, demonstrating at the Farnborough Airshow in September 1955

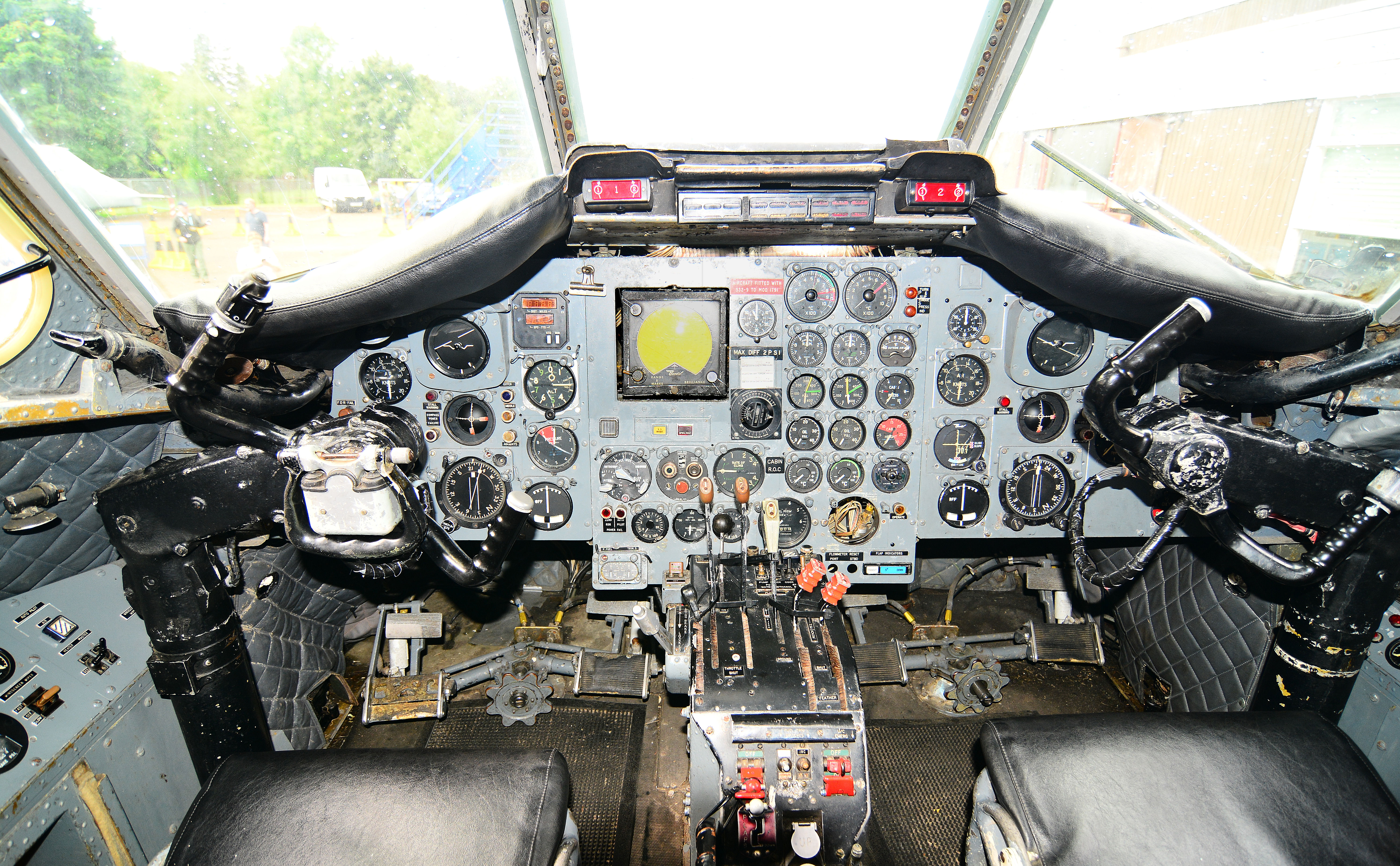
Cockpit

After extensive consultation with DC-3 operators, it was decided to power the new airliner with piston engines, rather than turboprops, which were considered risky by the small airlines at which the HPR.3 was aimed. Handley Page preferred a four-engined design, which led to the new 870 hp (650 kW) Alvis Leonides Major 14-cylinder radial engine, driving three-bladed propellers being chosen for the HPR.3. At almost the same time, the Dutch company Fokker made the opposite choice for its competitor for the same market, choosing to power the F27 Friendship with two Rolls-Royce Darts.

The HPR.3 could carry up to 44 passengers in its pressurised cabin, which could be quickly converted to allow the carrying of freight, with the aircraft's high wing, nosewheel undercarriage and large doors at the front and rear of the cabin making the loading of cargo relatively simple. Large flaps were fitted to give good short takeoff and landing characteristics. It was designed to cruise at a speed of 224 mph (360 km/h), had a range of 1,640 mi (2,640 km), could land and take off in a distance of less than 500 yards (460 m) and had an initial rate of climb of over 1,800 ft/min.

At first, it seemed that Handley Page had made the right choices with the HPR.3, which was named "Herald" in August 1954, this being a name easily translatable into French and Spanish. Extensive work by the sales team had produced considerable interest from potential customers, and Handley Page had 29 orders for the Herald (from Queensland Airlines, Australian National Airways, and Lloyd Aéreo Colombiano) by the time the first prototype made its maiden flight from Radlett on 25 August 1955, three months ahead of the first flight of the Friendship. Break-even was expected after the sale of 75 aircraft and Handley Page expected total sales of up to 300 Heralds, with first deliveries expected to British independent airline Air Kruise in 1958.

By now, however, the Rolls-Royce Dart turboprop engine had shown proven success in the Vickers Viscount. Queensland Airlines and Australian National Airways cancelled their orders for Heralds in favour of turboprop-powered Friendships, while the Lloyd Aéreo Colombiano contract was stopped due to currency problems and Air Kruise's interest was ended when it was taken over by British Aviation Services. Before the second prototype had been completed, Handley Page was faced with the fact that it had no orders for the Herald, and that the market had changed and wanted turboprops.

There had already been a very substantial investment in the Herald project, such that the management held a meeting to discuss continuation. Handley Page decided to press ahead with the Herald project, in an effort to recover the investment; announcing a new uprated version powered by the Rolls-Royce Dart. The revised aircraft, now designated the HPR.7 Dart Herald, was powered by 1,910 shp Dart 527 engines driving 12 ft 6 in (3.81 m) variable pitch four-blade Dowty Rotol propellers, and the fuselage was lengthened by 20 in (51 cm), while other improvements included increased fuel capacity. The first prototype was converted to Dart Herald standard, making its maiden flight on 11 March 1958, with the first production aircraft flying on 30 October 1959. The initial Series 100 version of the Dart Herald was certified in April 1958. The basic price in 1960 was around £185,000.

== Operational history ==
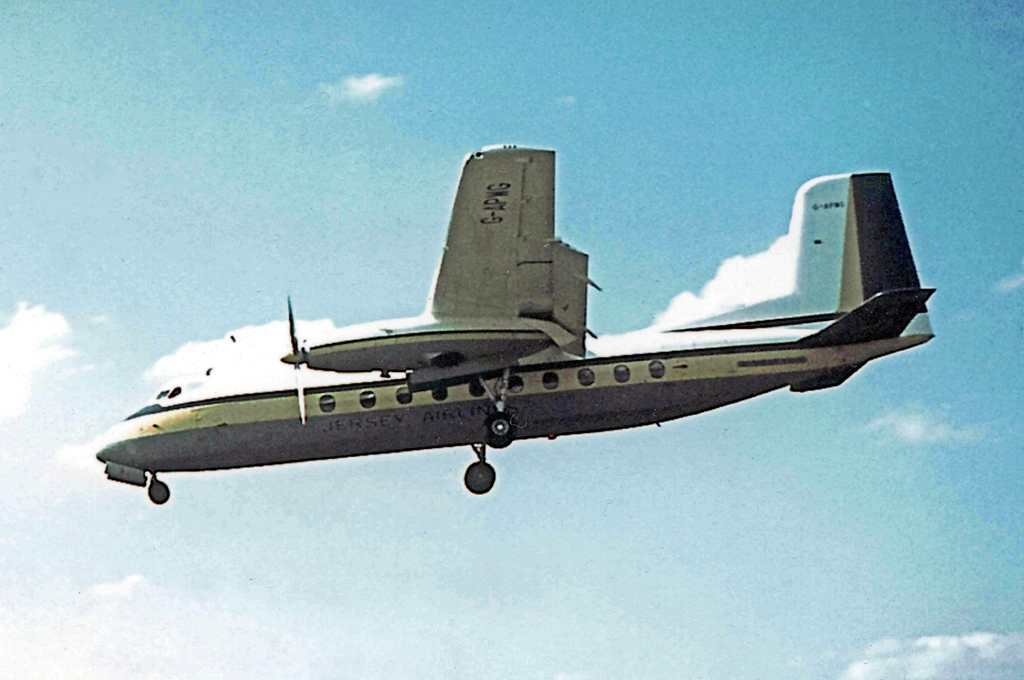
HPR.7 Herald 201 of Jersey Airlines on final approach to Manchester Airport in August 1962

The first order for the Dart Herald was in June 1959 from British European Airways for a lease of three aircraft for use on its Scottish Highlands and Islands routes. The Herald, had by this time, lost its initial lead over the Friendship, which had entered service over six months previously, and to stimulate demand, Handley Page launched in 1960 a further improved version, the Series 200, which was lengthened by 42 in (107 cm), with corresponding increased weights, allowing up to 56 passengers to be carried, and attracted an order for six aircraft from Jersey Airlines.

The second prototype was converted to Series 200 standard and first flew in that form on 8 April 1961. Jersey Airlines began operations with a leased Series 100 on 16 May 1961, receiving the first of its own Series 200s in January 1962, while BEA began Herald operations in March 1962.

The Herald attracted much early interest around the world because of its astonishing short field performance and excellent flight characteristics, but Handley Page failed to close many of the deals, as the F-27 and the Avro 748/HS.748 had become rival offerings, both of which proved significantly more popular. A key design feature of the Herald was the high-mounted wing, but with a noticeable dihedral. In addition, the Herald's vertical fin was covered with miniature airfoils, adding further to the Herald's excellent stability. Pilots reported that the Herald flew like a dream; very stable in the air, yet highly manoeuvrable even at slow speed. Ground handling was said to be the Herald's only vice due to an overlarge tailfin.

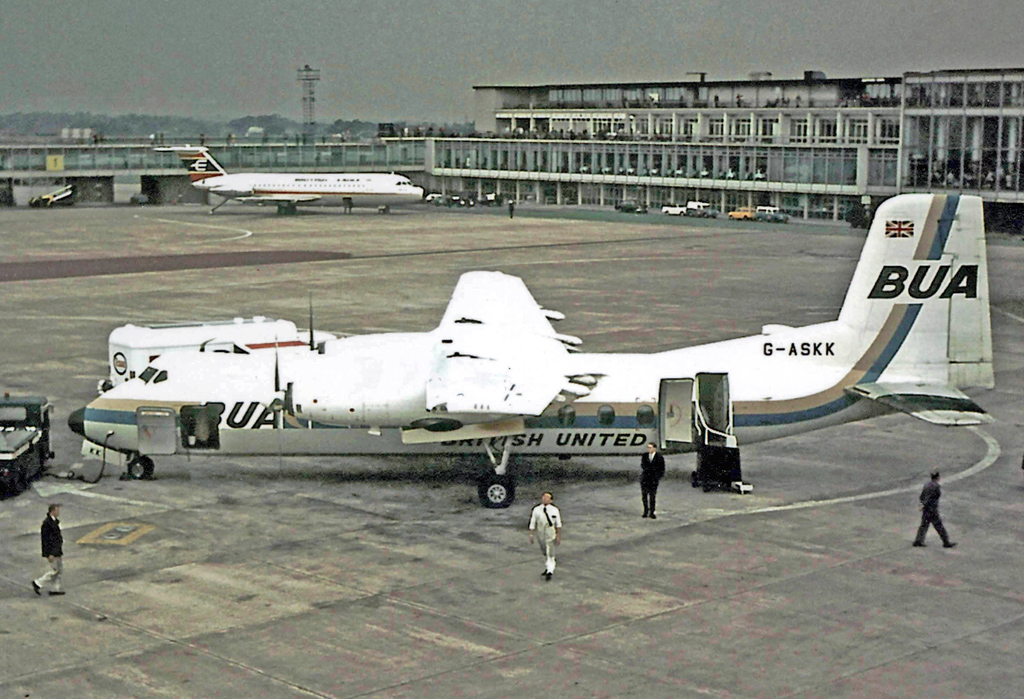
Herald 211 of British United Airways operating a scheduled service at Manchester Airport in August 1967

While the Series 200 was more commercially attractive, with no more Series 100 being ordered, sales were still slow. While the Herald was cheap compared to its major competitors, and in the 200 series had a roomy cabin, the Friendship could carry a larger payload and both the Friendship and the Avro 748/HS.748 had better performance, resulting in superior long-term economics. By 1963, only 35 Heralds had been sold compared with over 240 Friendships.

One hope of improving sales was to develop the Herald as a military transport. The Royal Air Force had a requirement for 45 tactical transports to replace piston-engined Vickers Valettas, and Handley Page began work in 1960 on the HP.124 to meet this need. This would have a new rear fuselage with a rear loading ramp under the raised tail. The HP.124 was considered favourite to beat Avro's 748 derivative, the Avro 780, with the high wing of the Handley Page expected to give easier loading than the more expensive Avro. While short-field testing of the prototype Herald 200 at RAF Martlesham Heath in 1961 showed off the Herald's good handling and ability to operate from unprepared airstrips, other obstacles were more taxing. The Minister of Aviation, Peter Thorneycroft, refused to sign a contract for the HP.124 unless Handley Page would agree to a merger with British Aircraft Corporation or Hawker Siddeley as part of the government's policy of consolidation of the British aircraft industry. As Hawker Siddeley offered less than half the valuation that Frederick Handley Page placed on the company, the merger did not occur, and the RAF's order went to the Avro 780, which became the Andover. The Herald Series 400 was a simpler tactical transport with a strengthened cabin floor and side loading doors that could be opened in flight for dropping of supplies or paratroops. Eight were built for the Royal Malaysian Air Force.

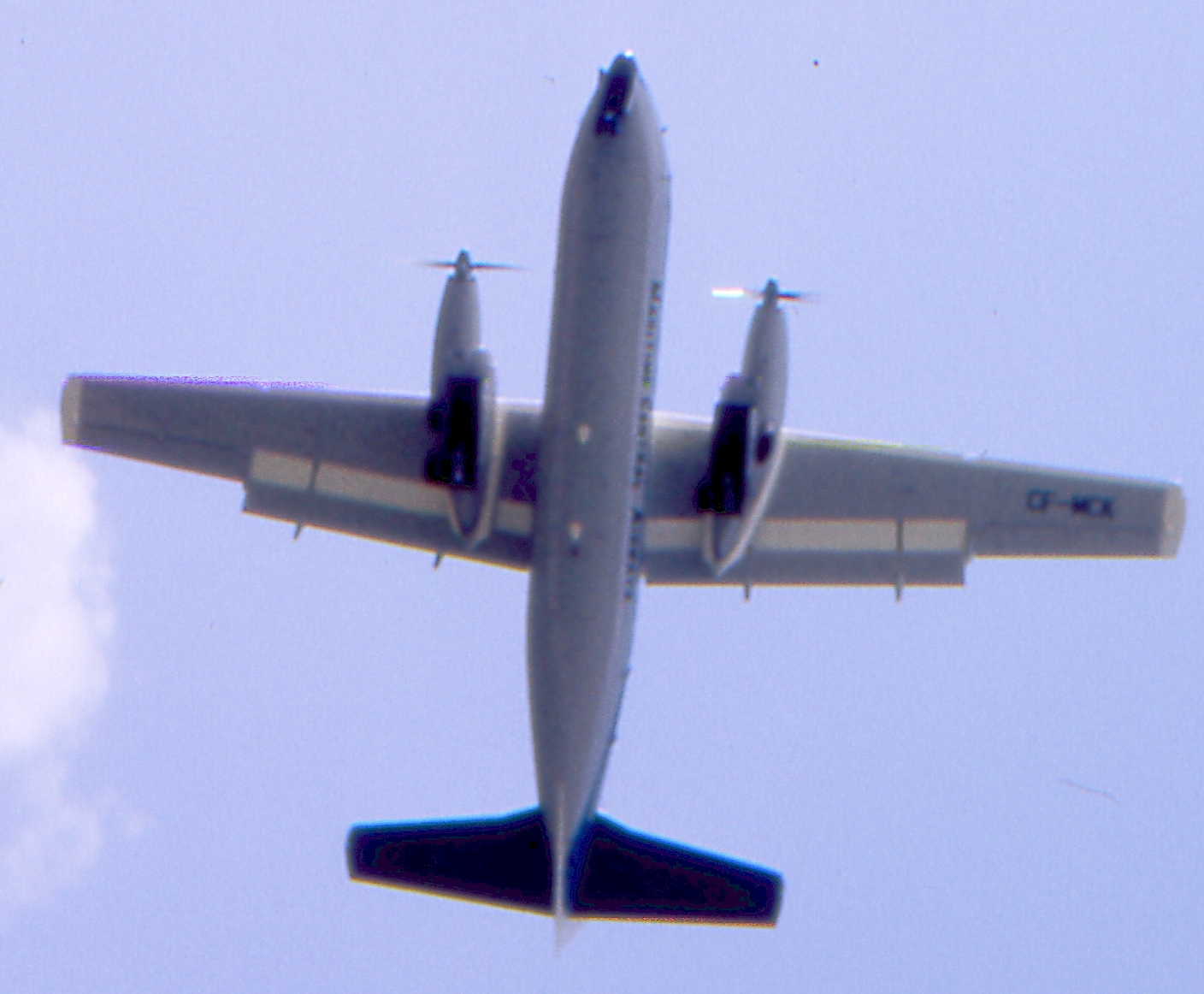
Dart Herald Srs 202

By 1965, almost all sales momentum had been lost, and Handley Page proposed the Series 700, powered by 2,320 ehp (1,730 kW) Dart 532s, with increased fuel and weights and was capable of seating up to 60 passengers. The Brazilian airline VASP placed an order for ten Series 700s, with plans made for production in Brazil, while further orders for the 700 were placed by Swiss airline Globe Air and Taiwanese Far Eastern Air Transport, and production started on the new model. VASP cancelled its order, however, when it could not obtain financing from the Brazilian government, and Handley Page stopped work on the 700, scrapping six airframes on the production line.

Production ended in 1968. Only 36 examples of the Series 200 production model were eventually built during the six years of production, together with four Series 100s and eight Series 400s. The 50th, and last, Herald (a series 200 for Israel's Arkia) was flown and delivered in August 1968, after which Herald production ceased, allowing Handley Page's attention to be fully focused on the HP.137 Jetstream.

Handley Page went into voluntary liquidation in August 1969, the spiralling cost of developing the Jetstream forcing its closure. Continuing support for the remaining Heralds in service was maintained by the setting up of a new company, Dart Herald (Support) Ltd, partly owned by Scottish Aviation.

The Herald's last ever passenger flight was operated by British Air Ferries in 1987 doing subcharters for Ryanair. The type remained in use as a freighter, but by 1999 the only one remaining in service was a series 401 G-BEYF with Channel Express; it was retired at Bournemouth after its last flight on 9 April 1999.

== Variants ==
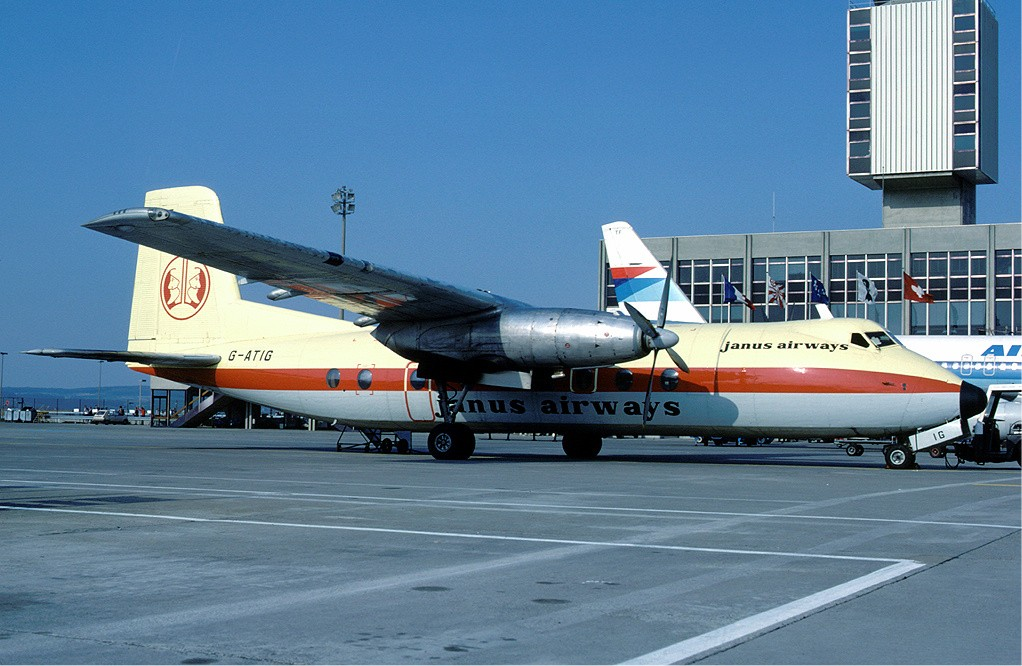
Handley Page HPR-7 Herald 214 of Janus Airways at Basle Airport, 15 April 1984

HPR-3 Herald
Prototype powered by four Alvis Leonides Major 702/1 14-cyl. radial engines – seating capacity 44
HPR-7 Dart Herald
Series 100
Initial Dart turboprop production version. Four built.
Series 200
Fuselage length increased from 71 ft 11 in to 75 ft 6 in and maximum accommodation rose from 47 to 56 seats. 36 built.
Series 300
Proposed version with modifications to meet United States Airworthiness requirements.
Series 400
Side-loading military transport derivative of the Series 200 incorporating a strengthened floor for carrying freight, 50 troops or 24 casualty stretchers and medical attendants. Eight built for the Royal Malaysian Air Force.
Series 500
Proposed more powerful version of the 400.
Series 600
Proposed version with 5 ft (1.5 m) increase in fuselage length and more powerful Dart turboprops. High-density accommodation for 64–68 passengers.
Series 700
Longer-range version similar to the Series 600 but without fuselage lengthening. Ten ordered by VASP but production not initiated.
HPR-8
Planned car-ferry derivative of Herald to meet 1959 Silver City Airways requirement. It had a new, unpressurised fuselage with clamshell doors in the nose, capable of carrying six cars or 100 passengers. It was rejected in favour of the Aviation Traders Carvair and went unbuilt.
HP.124
Proposed tactical transport with rear loading ramp for RAF. Unbuilt.
HP.125
Proposed V/STOL transport based on HP.124, with 18 Rolls-Royce RB162 lift-jets in underwing pods. Unbuilt.
HP.127 "Jet Herald"
1962 study for pure jet-powered development of Herald. Based on basic Herald design but with a stretched fuselage, accommodating up to 70 passengers, and powered by two Rolls-Royce Spey turbofan engines slung in pods under the shortened but still straight wings. Project unbuilt.
HP.129 "Mini Herald"
Design for smaller, jet-powered derivative of Herald, powered by two Speys and seating 30 passengers. Unbuilt.
HP.131
Improved HP.124 offered to Belgium in 1965 along with HP.132 and HP.133. Unbuilt.
HP.132
Variant of HP.133 with additional General Electric CF700 boost engines in wingtips. Unbuilt.
HP.133
As HP.132 but with CF700s in retractable nacelles. Unbuilt.

== Operators ==
=== Civil operators ===
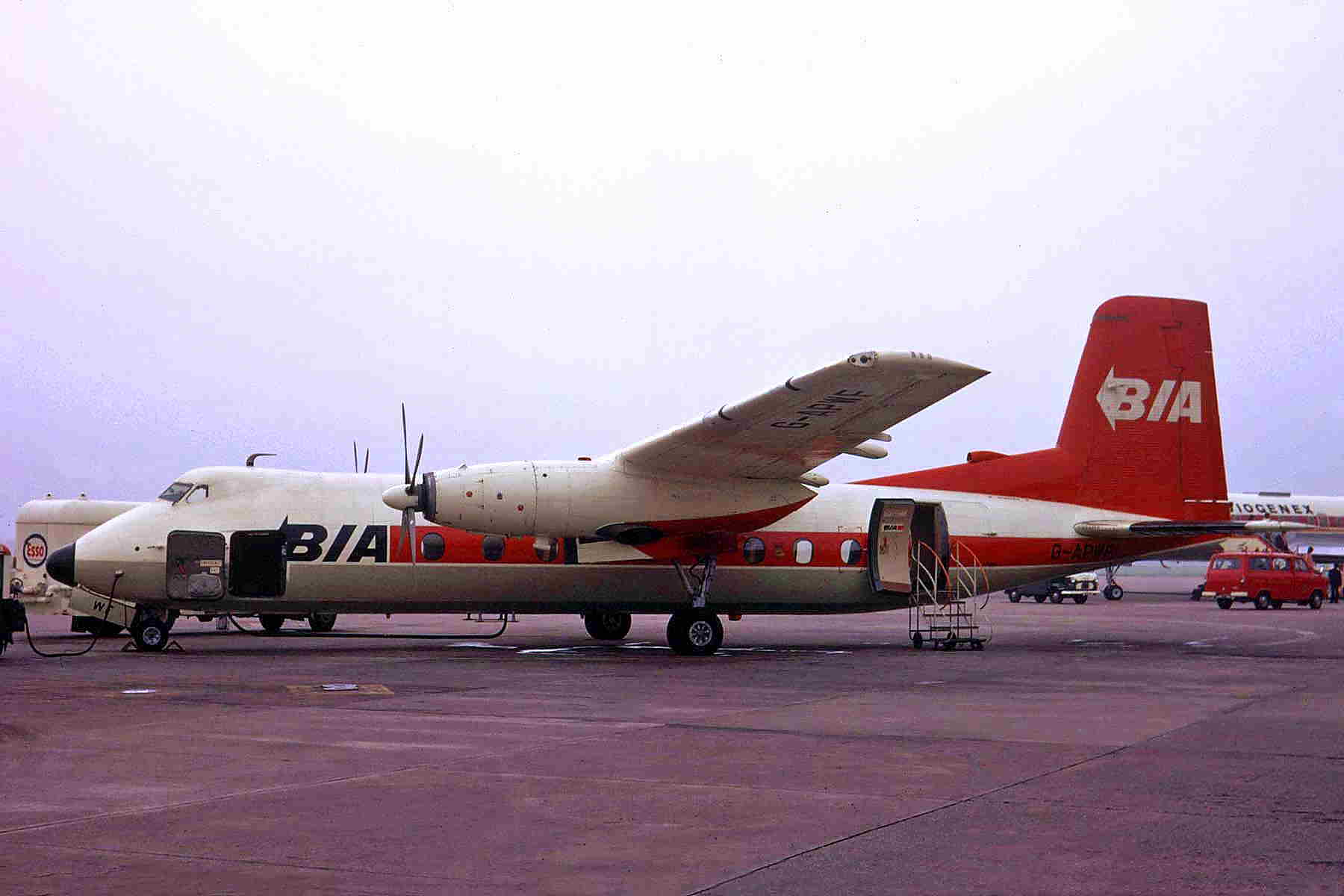
British Island Airways Dart Herald; BIA operated up to 20 examples of this type

Brazil

- SADIA SA Transportes Aéreos (Later renamed Transbrasil) – 8 as first operator
- TABA – Transportes Aéreos da Bacia Amazônica

Canada

- Eastern Provincial Airways – 4 as first operator
- Maritime Central Airways – 1 as first operator
- Nordair – 1 as first operator

Colombia

- Líneas Aéreas La Urraca

France

- Europe Aero Service

Germany

- Bavaria Fluggesellschaft – 2 as first operator

Guatemala

- Aerovías

Israel

- Arkia – 5 as first operator

Italy

- Aerolinee Itavia – 4 as first operator

Jordan

- Alia Jordanian Airlines – 1 as first (civil) operator

Philippines

- Air Manila International – 1 as first operator

Switzerland

- Globe Air – 3 as first operator

Taiwan

- Far Eastern Air Transport

United Kingdom

- Air UK
- Autair International Airlines
- BAC Charter
- BAC Express
- British Air Ferries – 7 as first (civil) operator
- British European Airways – 3 as first operator
- British Island Airways - at one point (1979) operated 20 Heralds
- British Midland Airways
- British United Airways – 6 as first operator
- British United Island Airways
- Brymon Airways
- Channel Express
- Court Line
- Janes Aviation
- Jersey Airlines – 3 as first operator
- Securicor (operated by Skyguard)
- South East Air

Zaire

- MMM Aero Service

Oman

- Oman aviation services

=== Military operators ===
Jordan

- Royal Jordanian Air Force

Malaysia

- Royal Malaysian Air Force

== Accidents and incidents ==
- On 10 August 1958, the prototype Dart Herald was due to appear at Farnborough air show but suffered an engine failure en route from Woodley. The fuel lines ruptured and a serious fire ensued. The engine bearers burned through and the aircraft was finally crash landed by the pilot, Squadron Leader Hedley Hazelden in a field. The landing was acknowledged as an astonishing feat of airmanship.
- On 17 March 1965, after a structural failure of the fuselage, Eastern Provincial Airways Flight 102 en route from Halifax to Sydney crashed near Upper Musquodoboit, Nova Scotia, killing all eight people on board. The fuselage had split lengthwise in midair along its belly owing to corrosion. After signs of corrosion were found both in a British European Airways' Herald and the Heralds operated by Alia, all Heralds in service were recalled by Handley Page for repair and corrosion-proofing.
- On 10 April 1965, JY-ACQ a Royal Jordanian Airlines Herald crashed into a hill near Damascus, Syria killing all 54 passengers and crew on board.
- On 3 November 1967, a Sadia Handley Page Dart Herald 214 registration PP-SDJ flying from São Paulo-Congonhas to Curitiba-Afonso Pena collided with a hill during the approach to Curitiba. All crew and 21 passengers died; four passengers survived.
- On 24 February 1969, Far Eastern Air Transport Flight 104 crashed on approach after engine two failed near Tainan, Taiwan killing all 36 on board.

== Aircraft on display ==
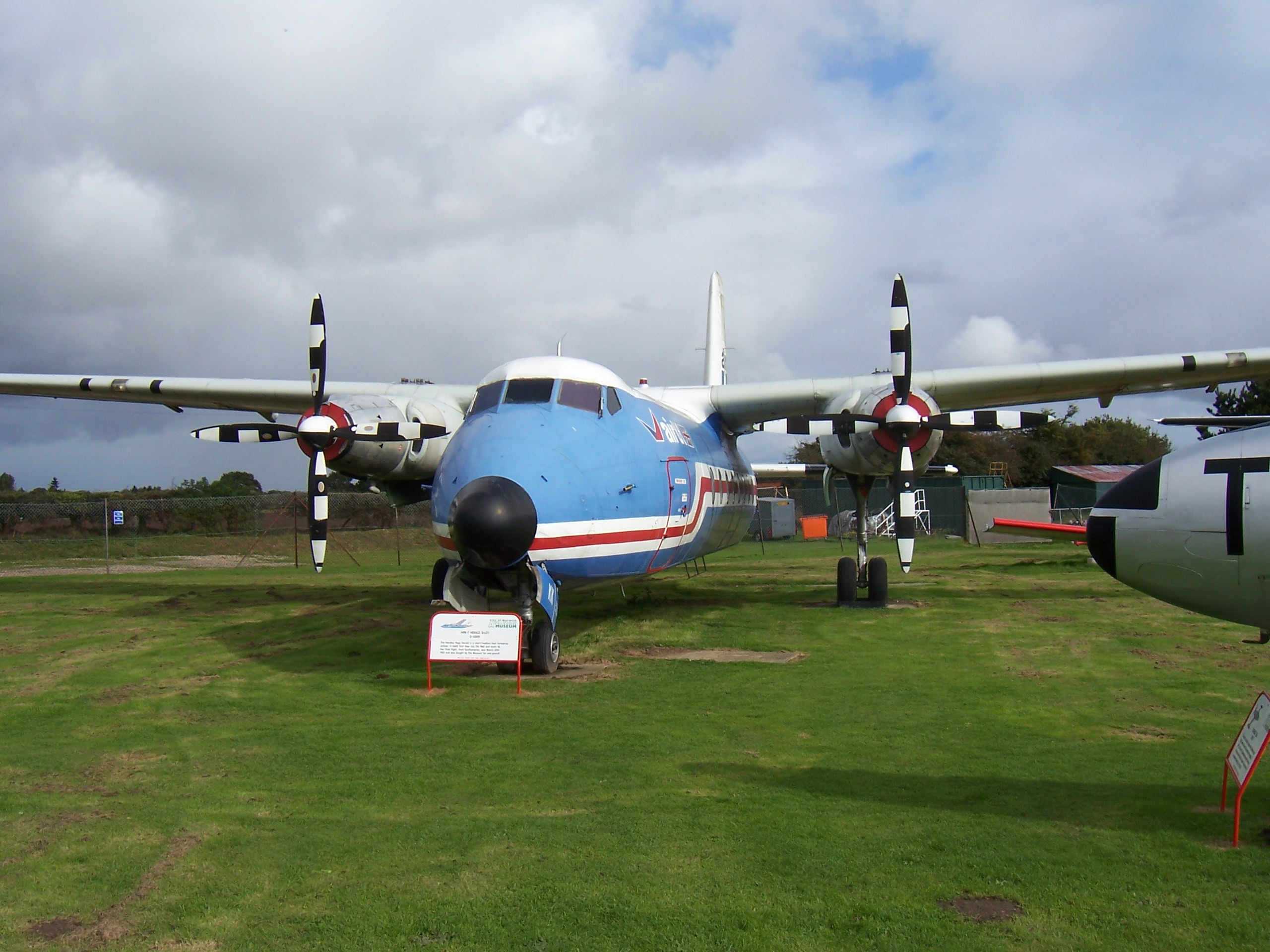
HPR.7 Herald 211 G-ASKK preserved at the City of Norwich Aviation Museum

=== United Kingdom ===
On Display

- Herald 100 G-APWA at the Museum of Berkshire Aviation, Woodley.
- Herald 201 G-APWJ at Morayvia, Kinloss, Scotland, in Air UK markings. It was formerly on display at Imperial War Museum Duxford from 1985 to 2021.
- Herald 211 G-ASKK at the City of Norwich Aviation Museum, Norwich Airport, Norfolk.

== Specifications (Dart Herald 200) ==
Data from Jane's All the World's Aircraft 1969-70

General characteristics

- Crew: 2
- Capacity: 50-56 passengers, 11,700 lb (5,300 kg) maximum payload
- Length: 75 ft 6 in (23.01 m)
- Wingspan: 94 ft 9.5 in (28.893 m)
- Height: 24 ft 1 in (7.34 m)
- Wing area: 886 sq ft (82.3 m^{2})
- Airfoil: root: NACA 23016.5; tip: NACA 4412
- Empty weight: 25,800 lb (11,703 kg) equipped
- Max takeoff weight: 43,700 lb (19,818 kg)
- Maximum zero-fuel weight: 37,500 lb (17,000 kg)
- Maximum landing weight: 39,500 lb (17,900 kg)
- Fuel capacity: 1,080 imp gal (1,297 US gal; 4,910 L) (Note: Two optional 600 imp gal (721 US gal; 2,728 L) under-wing tanks could be fitted)
- Powerplant: 2 × Rolls-Royce RDa.7 Dart Mk.527 turboprop engines, 2,105 shp (1,570 kW) each equivalent (Note: (1,910 shp (1,420 kW) + 505 lbf (2,250 N) residual thrust)
- Propellers: 4-bladed Rotol, 12 ft 6 in (3.81 m) diameter constant-speed fully-feathering propellers

Performance

- Cruise speed: 239 kn (275 mph, 443 km/h) at 15,000 ft (4,600 m) and 39,500 lb (17,900 kg) AUW
- Stall speed: 65 kn (75 mph, 120 km/h) at 30,000 lb (14,000 kg) AUW
- Never exceed speed: 304 kn (350 mph, 563 km/h)
- Range: 608 nmi (700 mi, 1,126 km) with max. payload, 87 nmi (100 mi; 161 km) diversion, 45 minutes holding (Note: 1,529 nmi (1,760 mi; 2,832 km) with max. standard fuel, no allowances)
- Service ceiling: 27,900 ft (8,500 m) at 35,000 lb (16,000 kg) AUW (Note: Service ceiling on one engine: 13,000 ft (4,000 m) at 35,000 lb (16,000 kg) AUW)
- Rate of climb: 1,805 ft/min (9.17 m/s) at 41,000 lb (19,000 kg) AUW
- Wing loading: 48.5 lb/sq ft (237 kg/m^{2})
- Power/mass: 0.098 shp/lb (0.161 kW/kg) (equivalent hp)
- Take-off distance to 35 ft (11 m): 2,700 ft (820 m) at 39,500 lb (17,900 kg) AUW
- Landing distance from 50 ft (15 m): 1,900 ft (580 m) at 39,500 lb (17,900 kg) AUW

== See also ==
Aircraft of comparable role, configuration, and era

- Antonov An-24
- Fairchild Hiller FH-227
- Fokker F27 Friendship
- Hawker Siddeley HS 748
