= 1965 Damascus Alia Handley Page Herald crash =

Aviation incident in Syria

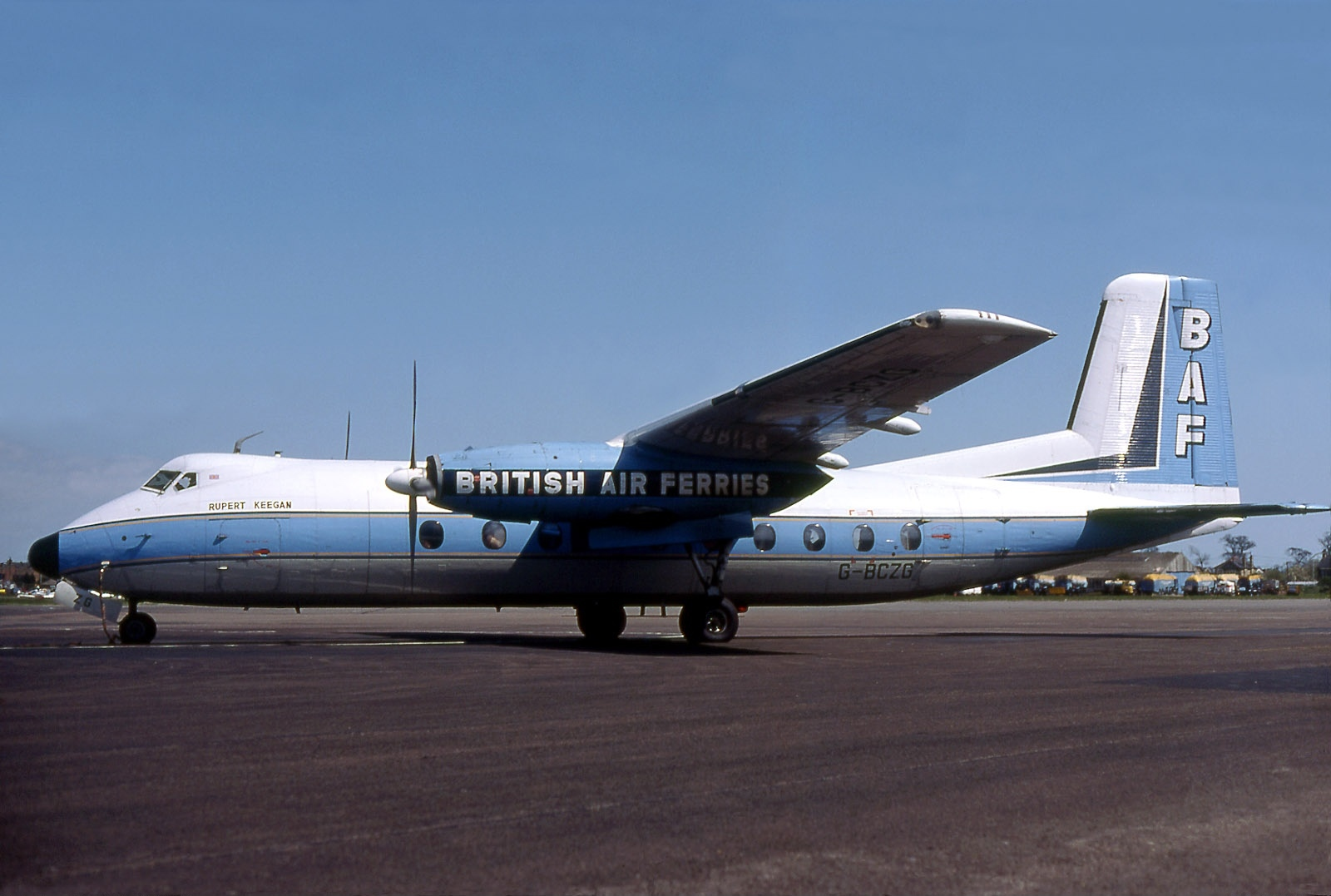
- A Handley Page Herald similar to the one involved

Accident
- Date: April 10, 1965
- Summary: In-flight breakup caused by severe corrosion
- Site: 20 km west-northwest of Damascus, Syria 33°34'32" N, 36°04'42" E.

Aircraft
- Aircraft type: Handley Page HPR-7 Herald 202
- Operator: Royal Jordanian
- Registration: JY-ACQ
- Flight origin: Beirut–Rafic Hariri International Airport, Beirut, Lebanon
- Destination: Queen Alia International Airport, Amman, Jordan
- Occupants: 54
- Passengers: 50
- Crew: 4
- Fatalities: 54

On 10 April 1965, a Handley Page HPR-7 Dart Herald 207, operating for Alia Royal Jordanian Airlines (now known as Jordanian Air) on a charter flight from Beirut, Lebanon to Amman, Jordan broke apart in flight and crashed 20 kilometers west-northwest of Damascus, Syria. All 54 people on board were killed in what was at the time the deadliest aviation accident in Syria and the deadliest aviation accident to involve the Handley Page Dart Herald.

After the crash Schiphol was heavily criticized over its charter flight policy.

== Aircraft and crew ==
The aircraft involved was a Handley Page HPR-7 Dart Herald 207 (registration JY-ACQ), built in 1963 and originally was used in the Royal Jordanian Air Force. The aircraft would later be handed over to Alia Royal Jordanian Airlines. The two-engine short-haul passenger aircraft was powered with two Rolls Royce Dart engines.

The flight crew consisted of a captain, a first officer and two flight attendants. The captain had accumulated a total of 7453 flight hours, of which 1053 were in the Handley Page Herald. The first officer had accumulated a total of 2021 flight hours, of which 1161 were on the accident aircraft type. In the past 90 days, he had accumulated an additional 155 hours.

== Accident ==
The passengers consisted of 210 European tourists on a low-cost package holiday organized by the Omar Khayyam travel organization.

On 10 April 1965, 50 tourists boarded the Herald to continue their journey from Beirut toward Jerusalem via Damascus, where they intended to celebrate Easter. The passengers included 47 Belgians, two Dutch nationals, and one Swiss.

Approximately fifteen minutes after departing Beirut, the aircraft suffered an in-flight structural failure. Witnesses on the ground reported hearing an explosion-like sound and flaming aircraft debris falling from the sky and landing on the slopes of Mount Kanisah near the Syrian–Lebanese border. The remains of eight passengers were found approximately one kilometre from the main crash site, suggesting that they had been thrown or had fallen from the aircraft before impact.

All 54 people aboard were killed. Many victims were severely burned, complicating identification and repatriation efforts. Rescue teams could reach the remote crash site only on foot.

== Investigation ==
Three days after the crash, the cause of the crash remained unknown despite intensive inquiries, and an international panel of civil aviation experts was expected to convene in Damascus to investigate the tragedy further.

The investgation was hampered by the aircraft that was severely damaged by fire.

It was established that the cause of the crash was structural failure of the fuselage during the flight That occurred before fire broke out.

== Aftermath ==
The crash caused widespread mourning and confusion in Belgium, where more than 180 Belgians had participated in the tour. Radio stations broadcast funeral music while families overwhelmed the Foreign Ministry seeking information, complicated by last-minute passenger reshuffling and incomplete victim lists from Syrian authorities.

Three days after the disaster, recovery teams had identified and repatriated 25 European victims, whose (burned) remains were flown to Brussels aboard a chartered KLM aircraft during an official ceremony attended by Belgian, Dutch, and Swiss diplomats.

The Jordanian airline operating the aircraft insured its passengers in accordance with IATA regulations and the Warsaw Convention, while the Jordanian government had established a commission to determine responsibility and oversee compensation for the victims.

=== Criticism ===
==== Omar Khayyam ====
Following the crash near Damascus, surviving passengers sharply criticized the organization of the Omar Khayyam Middle East tour, describing the trip as chaotic, deceptive, and poorly managed. Travelers reported that many tourists who had booked holidays in Egypt were unexpectedly diverted to Beirut against their wishes after last-minute itinerary changes. In Beirut, the chartered Super Constellation was grounded because it lacked valid papers, leaving passengers stranded amid confusion and protests. Omar Khayyam eventually arranged onward transport aboard a newly chartered Alia Handley Page Dart Herald which resulted into this crash. Survivors also accused the company of inadequate communication, disorganized travel arrangements, and mistreatment of passengers throughout the journey.

Travel and hotel company Omar Khayyam's European director, Mr. Tarayan, denied the company’s responsibility for the crash, arguing that the travelers had voluntarily altered their itinerary and that liability and compensation rested with the Jordanian airline and authorities under international aviation conventions.

=== Cabin pressurization ===
Due to this crash, and the Eastern Provincial Airways Flight 102 in March 1965, Handley Page advised all airlines operating its Herald aircraft to stop using cabin pressurization after corrosion was discovered in the fuselage skin of two planes.
