= Barkley-Grow Aircraft =

Barkley-Grow Aircraft Corporation
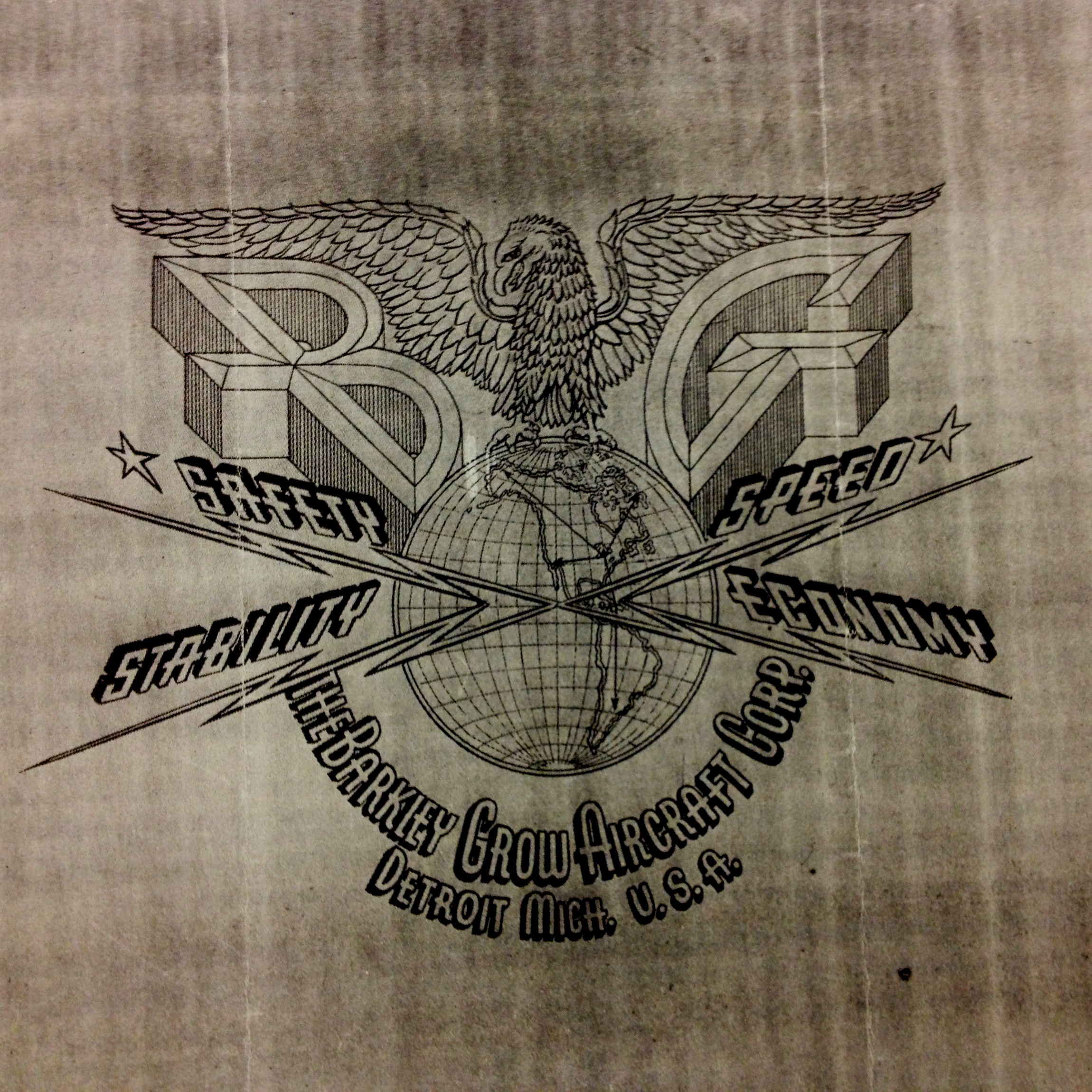
- Founded: 1936
- Founders: Archiebald St Clair Barkley; Harold Barkley Grow
- Headquarters: Detroit, Michigan, United States
- Parent: General American Transportation Corporation (1939); Aviation Corporation (1940)

The Barkley-Grow Aircraft Corporation was an American aircraft manufacturer established by Archiebald St Clair Barkley and Captain Harold Barkley Grow in Detroit in 1936 to produce a small civil transport which incorporated Barkley's patented wing design, the Barkley-Grow T8P-1.

== History ==
Initially purchased by the General American Transportation Corporation in 1939, the company was bought by AVCO only a year later in 1940. Meanwhile, Roland A. Freeman the former chief of the experimental division, founded his own company in Santa Monica, California. The Barkley-Grow factory at the Detroit City Airport was seized by the city after a short dispute with Vultee, and turned into an aviation technical high school in 1943.

A Barkley-Grow seaplane went to Antarctica in 1939 on board the USS Bear to support the United States Antarctic Service Expedition under the supervision of Rear Admiral Richard E. Byrd.

== Aircraft ==
Model name	First flight	Number built	Type
Barkley-Grow T8P-1	1937	11	Twin engine transport monoplane
