= The Hangar Flight Museum =

- Location within Alberta
- Former name: Aero Space Museum of Calgary
- Established: 1975
- Location: Calgary, Alberta
- Coordinates: 51.094167°N 114.013056°W
- Type: Aerospace museum
- Founder: Bill Watts
- Director: Brian Desjardins
- Website: thehangarmuseum.ca

The Hangar Flight Museum, formerly known as the Aero Space Museum of Calgary, is a museum located south of Calgary International Airport in Calgary, Alberta, Canada.

== History ==
The museum was founded in 1975 as the Aero Space Museum Association of Calgary by aviation enthusiasts and former World War II pilots. It built upon the history of an earlier private collection called the Air Museum of Canada. The museum moved to its current location in a former British Commonwealth Air Training Plan hangar in 1985.

Improvements to the facility since then have included wider hangar doors in 1997 and new windows in 2015.

A renovation was carried out in 2016 that included replacing the roof and installing a new HVAC system. That same year, the museum changed its name to The Hangar Flight Museum.

Following a seven-year restoration, the museum's Hawker Hurricane returned in 2019. Earlier that year, it began restoring its CF-100.

The museum's annex, a building used to store aircraft from its collection, had its fabric roof badly damaged in a windstorm in March 2023. This was the second time the building had been damaged by weather. The museum is engaged in fundraising to construct a new museum building. It opened a new, more accessible entrance in June 2025.

== Exhibits ==
The museum has an exhibit Canadian space programs as well as an archives containing documents about aeronautics.

A central War memorial stone slab and four other memorial slabs were erected by the Aircrew Association (Southern Alberta Branch) and the Aero Space Museum Association of Calgary. The plaque name the commonwealth air forces who trained in Calgary as part of the British Commonwealth Air Training Plan during the Second World War: Royal Canadian Air Force (RCAF); Royal Air Force (RAF); Royal Australian Air Force (RAAF); Royal New Zealand Air Force (RNZAF). In front of the slabs, a gravel mural of a Canadian roundel was painted.

The Aero Space Museum Association of Calgary erected a list of honour memorial dedicated to the Alberta Airmen who were killed in the Second World War.

The museum is affiliated with CMA, CHIN, and Virtual Museum of Canada.

== Aircraft on display ==
=== Airplanes ===
- AEA Silver Dart – replica
- Aeronca 7AC Champion 7AC770
- Avro Anson II Composite
- Avro Lancaster X FM136
- Avro Canada CF-100 Canuck IIID 18126
- Barkley-Grow T8P-1 8
- Beechcraft Expeditor 3NM Q/E 92-074
- Canadian Car and Foundry Harvard IV 20273
- Cessna 140 10825
- Cessna Ag Wagon 0007
- de Havilland Tiger Moth 3886
- de Havilland Vampire F.3 17069
- de Havilland Canada DHC-6 Twin Otter 2
- Douglas DC-3 13448
- Hawker Hurricane XII 5389
- McDonnell CF-101 Voodoo 101021
- North American F-86A Sabre 47-606
- QAC Quickie Q2
- Sopwith Triplane – replica
- Taylorcraft Auster VII
- Waco ECQ-6 4479

=== Gliders ===
- Hall Cherokee II

=== Helicopters ===
- Aérospatiale Alouette III
- Bell 47G
- Sikorsky S-51
- Sikorsky S-55

== See also ==
- Organization of Military Museums of Canada
- List of aerospace museums
- List of attractions and landmarks in Calgary
- Calgary
