= Eastern Provincial Airways =

Regional airline of Canada (1949–1986)

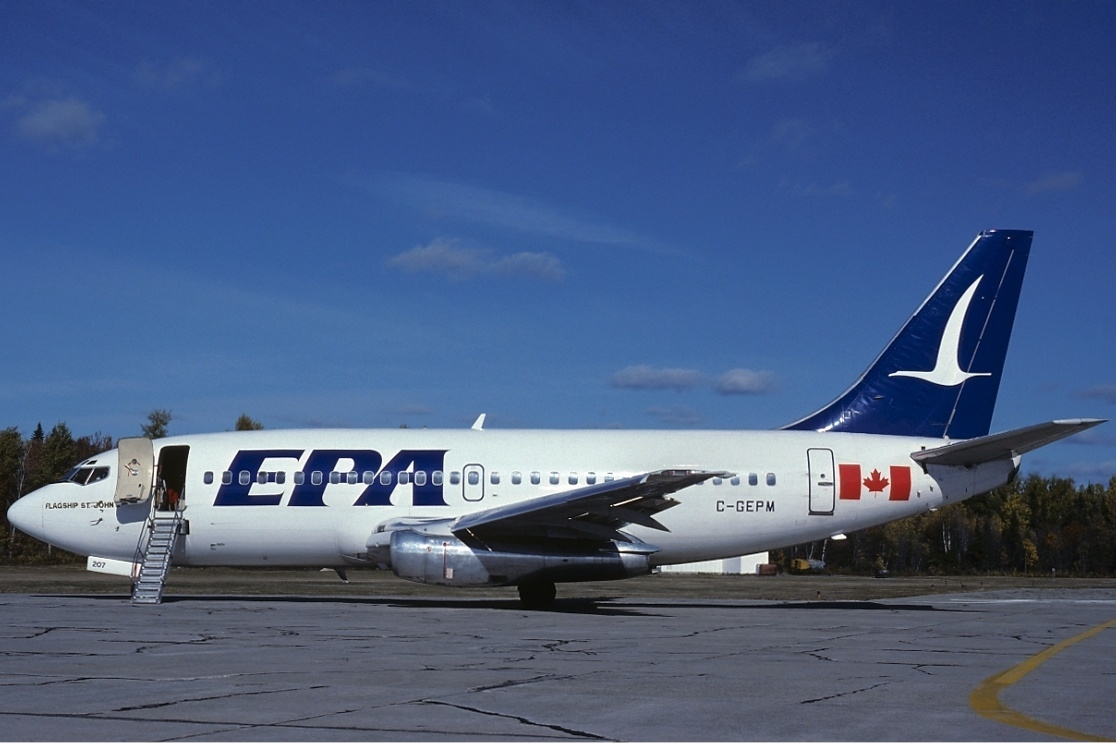
- 737-200 of Eastern Provincial Airlines at Miramichi Airport in 1985
IATA	ICAO	Call sign
PV	EPA	PROVINCIAL
- Founded: 1949
- Ceased operations: 1986 (merged into Canadian Pacific Air Lines)
- Hubs: Gander International Airport
- Secondary hubs: Halifax Stanfield International Airport
- Focus cities: St. John's International Airport
- Alliance: CP Air
- Subsidiaries: Air Maritime
- Fleet size: 7 Boeing 737-200s (when airline was purchased)
- Destinations: Atlantic Canada, Montreal, Ottawa, Toronto
- Headquarters: Gander, Newfoundland and Labrador
- Key people: Harry Steele, Chesley Crosbie, A.J. Lewington, Keith Miller

Eastern Provincial Airways (EPA) was an airline that operated in Atlantic and eastern Canada. At its peak in the 1970s, the carrier operated jet service with Boeing 737-200 aircraft connecting many communities that, in the first quarter of the 21st century, only have scheduled passenger flights provided by 18-seat commuter turboprop aircraft. The airline traces its history from Maritime Central Airways (MCA) from 1961. It merged with CP Air to form Canadian Pacific Air Lines in 1986.

== History ==
Eastern Provincial Airways began operations from St. John's, Newfoundland in 1949 acquiring and reorganizing the Newfoundland Aero Sales and Services. Early air services, like those of MCA, included a mixed bag of ambulance and mail services, cargo, charters, and forest and ice patrols, but would evolve into a modern air traffic carrier twenty years later. The company was founded with a Noorduyn Norseman aircraft by Eric Blackwood, a bush pilot and Royal Canadian Air Force veteran from World War II. Blackwood had the backing of St. John's businessman C.A. Crosbie.

The purchase of a PBY Canso amphibian aircraft in 1953 allowed EPA to take larger charter jobs, and a converted Canso allowed water-bombing flights on behalf of the government. In 1954, EPA moved its headquarters from St. John's to the now bustling international aviation hub in Gander where EPA planes mingled with the likes of Pan American and BOAC en route to or from Europe. But EPA's work still consisted mostly of a wide variety of government contracts. In Gander, EPA set up administrative offices and a maintenance hangar and with the addition of larger Douglas DC-3s and Lockheed Model 10 Electra twin prop aircraft, commenced regular passenger services between St. John's, Gander and Deer Lake in 1955–56. In addition to regional charter work, international projects were operated as well, including a contract beginning in 1958 to do extensive work in Greenland with PBY Cansos and de Havilland Canada DHC-3 Otters for Greenland Air until July 1965.

=== 1960s ===
In 1960, regular passenger services began to Wabush and Twin Falls in Labrador. Curtiss C-46s were leased for the routes with the first Handley Page Dart Herald twin turboprop aircraft being purchased in 1962. EPA was one of the few operators of the Herald in Canada and the type was never operated by any airline in the U.S. In 1963, EPA purchased Maritime Central and the two companies merged to form Eastern Provincial Airways (1963) Limited. The amalgamation allowed for a strong regional carrier to compete against government owned Trans Canada Airlines which later became Air Canada. According to the June 1, 1968 Eastern Provincial system timetable, the airline was operating all scheduled flights with 40-passenger Herald, 24-passenger Douglas DC-3 and 46-passenger Carvair aircraft with the latter being a converted version of the Douglas DC-4 which could transport either passengers or freight in an all-cargo configuration (the airline was operating both passenger and scheduled all-cargo flights with the Carvair at this time). This same timetable also includes charter information for a number of aircraft types operated by the airline in 1968, including not only the Herald, DC-3 and Carvair but also the four-passenger Beechcraft Baron, six-passenger de Havilland Canada DHC-2 Beaver, eight-passenger de Havilland Canada DHC-2T Turbo Beaver (which was a turboprop conversion of the original piston engine Beaver) and the ten-passenger de Havilland Canada DHC-3 Otter.

The mixed-bag operation continued until 1970. The 1960s saw EPA operate a varied fleet of 36 aircraft, including four Handley Page Heralds, six PBY Cansos, two Curtiss C-46s, two Sikorsky S-55 helicopters, one Douglas DC-4, five DC-3 workhorses, and the other smaller aircraft types mentioned above. The airline had a distinguished decade with work in India and Pakistan and they enjoyed the novelty of being the first Canadian airline in the new Soviet bloc Eastern Europe when EPA operated a cargo charter into Czechoslovakia.

=== 1970s ===
By 1970, EPA had started to resemble a modern airline. That year, EPA's bush operations were sold to some senior staff as a separate airline - Labrador Airways, now Air Labrador.

EPA decided to standardize with Boeing 737-200 jetliners in the 1970s. The airline acquired seven of the jets from Boeing. The same colour scheme that EPA developed in the 1960s was adopted. They were painted white with a silver belly and an orange stripe along the window line. The orange gander logo was put on the tail, and the nose cone was painted black. Inside, passengers sat in flower patterned seats of various colours of purple, orange, and yellow - fashionable colours in the 1970s.

EPA expressed an intent in the early 1970s to have an all-jet fleet as soon as practically possible. As it turned out, this was never to happen. EPA entered the decade with three Handley Page Heralds and two DC-3s. The Heralds were responsible for flights into Iles-de-la-Madeleine, Quebec and Charlo, Chatham and Fredericton, New Brunswick until 1974 when they were sold to British Air Ferries. EPA started jet service into the northern New Brunswick cities while a Hawker Siddeley HS 748 twin turboprop was acquired to replace the Heralds on the flights to Iles-de-la-Madeleine.

1972 and 1973 were good years for EPA. The number of passengers carried grew dramatically every year from 1969 until 1973. The company expanded, starting jet services into Saint John and Fredericton (New Brunswick) and Stephenville (Newfoundland). New employees were hired and EPA was successful in obtaining a Foreign Air Carrier Permit for the United States. EPA had interest in Sydney to Boston and Halifax to Portland and Bangor (Maine), but these routes never materialized. Instead, the company began to fly charters to Florida and the Caribbean in 1974.

Negotiations were begun with de Havilland Canada and the Canadian federal government for a subsidiary carrier to operate using de Havilland Canada DHC-7 Dash 7 turboprops. The Canadian federal application for the new service was rejected two years later and although the company renewed the application in 1977, Atlantic Canada wouldn't see Dash 7s until the mid-1980s when deregulation of the Canadian Aviation industry allowed for the Canadian Pacific feeder carrier Air Atlantic.

1975 was the first year EPA had a loss since entering the jet age in 1969. Over-capacity was partly dealt with by leasing 737s for six-month periods to Wien Air Alaska, Aloha Airlines, and Aer Lingus over the next couple of years. The airline's DC-3s were operated on the Gander-St. Anthony-Goose Bay and Sydney-St.Pierre routes until 1975 when the St. Anthony service was taken over by another carrier and early in 1976 the St. Pierre route was upgraded to a Hawker Siddeley 748. The DC-3 were disposed of—the last piston engined aircraft in EPA's fleet.

=== 1980s ===
In 1981 and 1982, EPA acquired three more Hawker Siddeley HS 748s from Austin Airways, Ghana Airways, and COPA of Panama. These planes were used to feed jet services on flights from Moncton, New Brunswick, Charlottetown, Îles-de-la-Madeleine and Saint-Pierre and Miquelon. In 1982 EPA set up Air Maritime as a wholly owned subsidiary to operate the 748s.

EPA's headquarters were moved from Gander, now no longer a major aviation centre, to Halifax. This allowed EPA to make Halifax a hub of operations and when schedules were coordinated with CP Air in 1983, Halifax became the main point of transit for passengers connecting from points further west to various places in the Maritimes and Newfoundland. By that time, EPA flew throughout Newfoundland, Nova Scotia, New Brunswick, and Prince Edward Island as well as far west as Montreal, Ottawa and Toronto.

EPA introduced a new colour scheme in the early eighties as well. Gone was the orange, replaced by a more up to date large navy blue "EPA" painted on the side of an all white side with the white gander on a blue background on the tail. Inside the 70s flower print seats were replaced by a more subtle beige with blue and red triangles.

The 1980s and deregulation meant dramatic changes for Canadian airlines, including EPA. By 1984, EPA had entered into a strategic alliance with CP Air of Vancouver. CP lacked a Canadian route network east of Montréal and EPA's Atlantic province network complemented CP very well with Toronto and Montréal acting as connecting hubs.

Soon afterwards, CP bought EPA and by 1986 EPA was no more as its operations were merged into CP Air. A new corporate personality soon was unveiled for CP with the resurrection of the Canadian Pacific Air Lines name and a modern blue, white and red colour scheme. Canadian Pacific later operated as Canadian Airlines International before being acquired by Air Canada.

=== Air Maritime ===
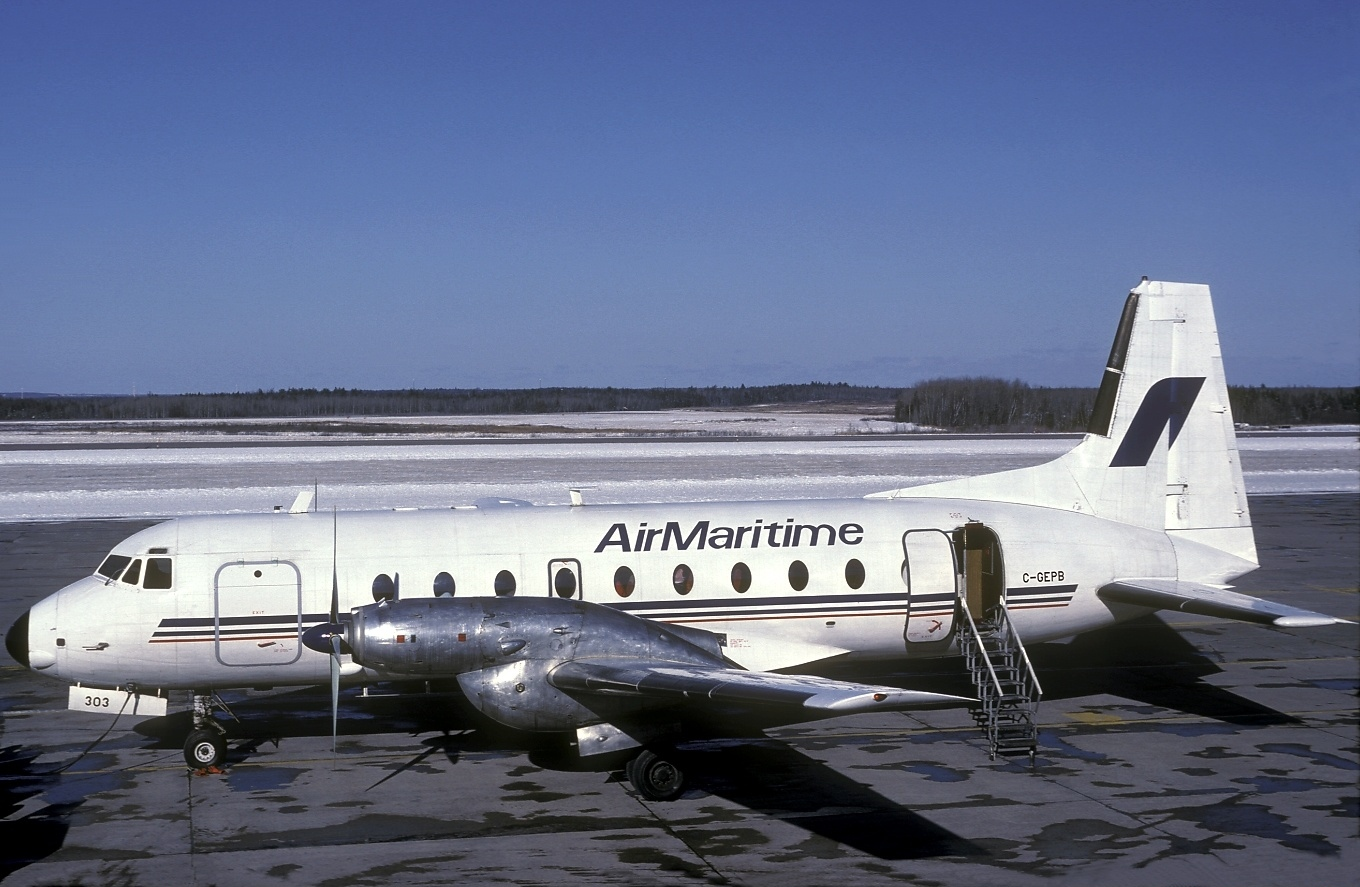
A Hawker Siddeley HS 748 of Air Maritime

Air Maritime was a Canadian airline that existed from 1982 to 1984 and was owned by Eastern Provincial Airways. The airline was short lived and used the Hawker Siddeley HS 748 to Maine from Halifax. They had to contract employees from EPA as they didn't have their own employees other than the management team. It operated a total of 4 HS 748 aircraft.

== Fleet ==
Eastern Provincial operated the following aircraft types during its existence:

Jet aircraft

- Boeing 737-200

Turboprop aircraft

- de Havilland Canada DHC-2T Turbo Beaver (turboprop conversion of the DHC-2 Beaver)
- Handley Page Dart Herald
- Hawker Siddeley HS 748

Piston aircraft

- Aviation Traders Carvair
- Beechcraft Baron
- Consolidated PBY Catalina (PBY Canso) - Amphibian aircraft
- Curtiss C-46
- de Havilland Canada DHC-2 Beaver
- de Havilland Canada DHC-3 Otter
- Douglas DC-3
- Douglas DC-4
- Lockheed Model 10 Electra
- Sikorsky S-55 - Helicopter

== Destinations in 1982 ==
According to the airline's route map dated April 5, 1982, Eastern Provincial was serving the following destinations with scheduled passenger flights primarily operated with Boeing 737-200 jetliners although some Hawker Siddeley HS 748 turboprop service was also being operated at this time:

- Charlo, New Brunswick
- Charlottetown, Prince Edward Island
- Chatham, New Brunswick
- Churchill Falls, Labrador
- Deer Lake, Newfoundland
- Fredericton, New Brunswick
- Gander, Newfoundland
- Goose Bay, Labrador
- Halifax, Nova Scotia
- Iles-de-la-Madeleine, Quebec
- Moncton, New Brunswick
- Montreal, Quebec
- Saint John, New Brunswick
- St. John's, Newfoundland
- Stephenville, Newfoundland
- Sydney, Nova Scotia
- Toronto, Ontario
- Wabush, Labrador

== Destinations in 1970 ==
According to the airline's Sept. 1, 1970 system timetable, Eastern Provincial was serving the following destinations at this time and was operating its flights with Boeing 737-200 jets, Handley Page Dart Herald turboprops and Douglas DC-3 prop aircraft:

- Charlo, New Brunswick
- Charlottetown, Prince Edward Island
- Chatham, New Brunswick
- Churchill Falls, Labrador
- Deer Lake, Newfoundland
- Gander, Newfoundland
- Goose Bay, Labrador
- Halifax, Nova Scotia
- Magdalen Islands, Quebec
- Moncton, New Brunswick
- Montreal, Quebec
- St. Anthony, Newfoundland
- St. John's, Newfoundland
- Sept Iles, Quebec
- Summerside, Prince Edward Island
- Sydney, Nova Scotia
- Wabush, Labrador

== Accidents and incidents ==
- On 1 October 1957, a Consolidated PBY-5A Catalina lost power and crashed upon returning to Goose Bay from supplying diesel fuel to the Bell Canada Tropospheric scatter site at Sona Lake.
- On 12 May 1962 - Consolidated PBY Catalina amphibian aircraft (CF-IHA) sinks at Godthab harbour, 15 passengers died.
- On 17 March 1965 - Flight 102 en route from Halifax to Sydney crashed near Upper Musquodoboit, Nova Scotia, killing all eight people on board. The Handley Page Herald fuselage had split lengthwise in midair along its belly owing to corrosion.

== See also ==
- List of defunct airlines of Canada
