= Barkley-Grow T8P-1 =

1930s airliner by Barkley-Grow

T8P-1
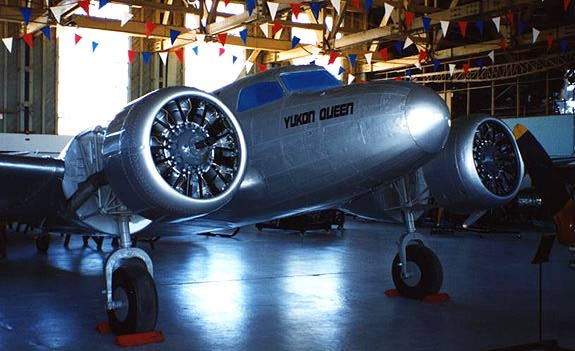
- CF-BLV while under restoration at the Aero Space Museum, Calgary, Alberta c. 2000

General information
- Type: Airliner
- Manufacturer: Barkley-Grow Aircraft
- Designer: Archibald Barkley
- Number built: 11

History
- First flight: April 1937

The Barkley-Grow T8P-1 was an airliner developed in the United States shortly before the Second World War. Although it saw limited production, the type was well-received as a bush plane in Canada.

== Design and development ==
Typical for the era, the Barkley-Grow T8P-1 was a low-wing monoplane of all-metal construction with a twin tail (an additional third tail was installed, à la Lockheed Constellation, when fitted with floats). The T8P (standing for Transport, 8 Passenger) was designed to be simple and rugged, thus the main units of the tailwheel undercarriage were not retractable, and this may have negatively impacted the type's reception in the marketplace. A novel design feature, however, was the wing structure. Barkley used what might be called a "horizontal cell" technique that has no ribs or spars. Long tapered strips of aluminium were bent to form V shapes which were then riveted tip to tip to form an "X". These "X"s are riveted inside the wing side by side to produce the long "cells". This wing structure was unique to the Barkley-Grow and according to mechanics who worked on the aircraft it was very light, very stiff, very expensive to build, and difficult to repair if damaged, but it gave no problems in service.

Like its two main competitors, the Lockheed Model 12 Electra Junior and the Beech 18, the T8P-1 was originally designed to a 1935 Bureau of Air Commerce specification (eventually won by the Lockheed entry).

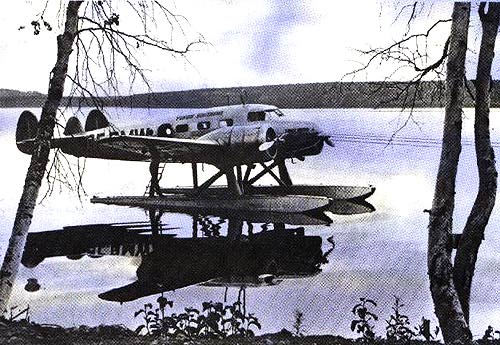
Barkley-Grow T8P-1 aircraft CF-BMW of Yukon Southern on floats on an Albertan lake in 1942

== Operational history ==
Sales in the US were disappointing, only 11 being built, and most machines (seven) were sold to Canada, where the fixed undercarriage was no obstacle to the fitting of skis or pontoons. One was selected for a record flight from Washington D.C. to Peru, and another was used in the Antarctic by the US Navy.

In 1942 A T8P-1 flown by Maritime Central Airways was used in the rescue attempt of survivors of a B-17 on the Greenland ice shelf. The aircraft was fitted with skis but force-landed on the ice on 22 December 1942 after encountering strong headwinds. The T8P-1 broke through the ice and sank leaving the pilots to be rescued by Inuit tribesmen.

== Surviving aircraft ==
- 1 – T8P-1 in storage at the Reynolds-Alberta Museum in Wetaskiwin, Alberta.
- 3 – T8P-1 on static display at the Alberta Aviation Museum in Edmonton, Alberta. It is on loan from The Hangar Flight Museum.
- 8 – T8P-1 (CF-BQM) on static display at The Hangar Flight Museum in Calgary, Alberta.

== Specifications ==
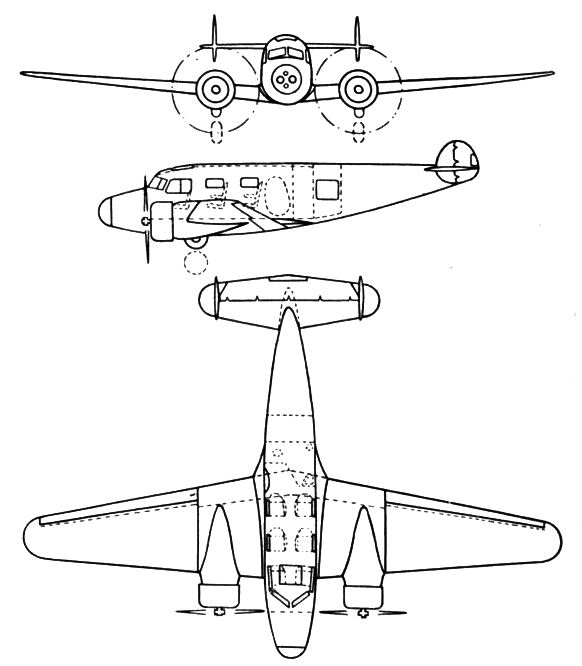
Barkley-Grow T8P 3-view drawing from L'Aerophile February 1936

Data from General Dynamics Aircraft and their Predecessors

General characteristics

- Crew: Two
- Capacity: 6 passengers
- Length: 35 ft 8 in (10.87 m)
- Wingspan: 50 ft 8 3/4 in (15.462 m)
- Height: 9 ft 7 1/2 in (2.934 m)
- Wing area: 354 sq ft (32.9 m^{2})
- Empty weight: 5,365 lb (2,434 kg)
- Gross weight: 8,750 lb (3,969 kg)
- Fuel capacity: 160 US gal (130 imp gal; 610 L) normal, 220 US gal (180 imp gal; 830 L) with optional tanks
- Powerplant: 2 × Pratt & Whitney Wasp Junior SB 9-cylinder air-cooled radial engines, 400 hp (300 kW) each

Performance

- Maximum speed: 225 mph (362 km/h, 196 kn) at 5,000 ft (1,500 m)
- Cruise speed: 204 mph (328 km/h, 177 kn) at 5,000 ft (1,500 m)
- Range: 470–630 mi (760–1,010 km, 410–550 nmi)
- Service ceiling: 24,000 ft (7,300 m)
- Rate of climb: 1,420 ft/min (7.2 m/s)

== See also ==
- Lockheed Model 10 Electra

Related lists

- List of aircraft of World War II
