= 1962 Godthab Catalina crash =

Flying boat crash in Greenland resulting in 15 casualties

1962 Goodthab Catalina crash
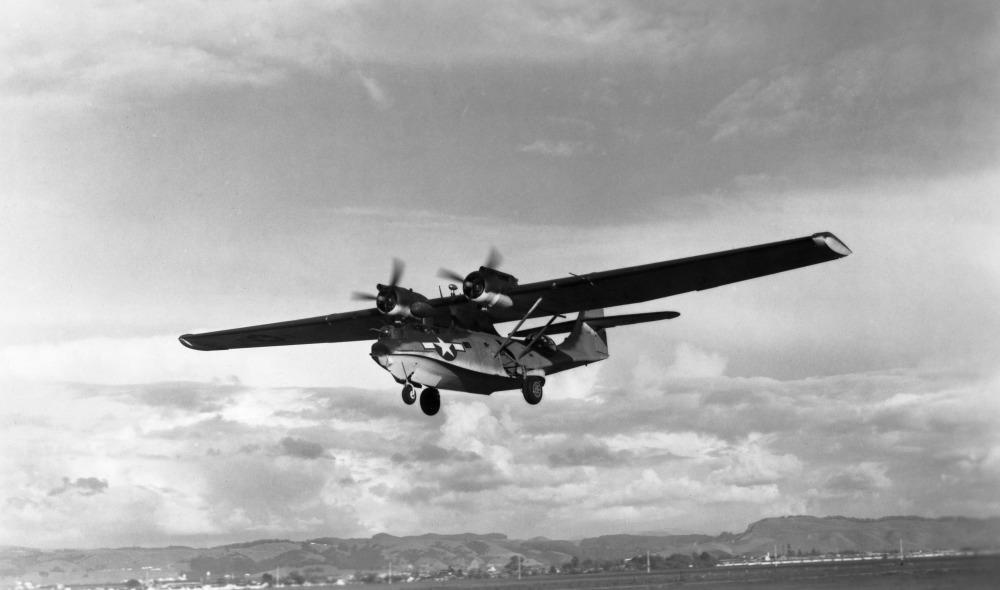
- A Consolidated PBY-5A similar to the accident aircraft

Accident
- Date: 12 May 1962
- Summary: Sank on landing
- Site: Godthab harbour

Aircraft
- Aircraft type: Canadian-Vickers PBY-5A Canso
- Operator: Eastern Provincial Airways on behalf of Greenlandair (now Air Greenland)
- Registration: CF-IHA
- Flight origin: Kangerlussuaq Airport, Greenland
- Destination: Godthåb, Greenland
- Occupants: 21
- Passengers: 18
- Crew: 3
- Fatalities: 15
- Survivors: 6

On 12 May 1962, an Eastern Provincial Airways Canso amphibian flying boat operating for Greenlandair (now Air Greenland) sank at Godthåb (now Nuuk) in Greenland, causing the death of 15 passengers.

== Accident ==
The Catalina was operating a scheduled flight from Kangerlussuaq Airport to Godthåb for Greenlandair with 21 on board, while landing on the water at Goodthab harbour it sank with 15 passengers being killed. Initial reports were that the aircraft had hit debris on the water.

== Aircraft ==
The aircraft CF-IHA was a Canadian-built variant of the Consolidated Catalina built by Canadian-Vickers in 1944. It was built for the Royal Canadian Air Force (RCAF) with serial number 11058 until it was sold in 1947.

== Investigation ==
A technical investigation concluded that the nose wheel doors had not closed properly probably due to mechanical failure. With a gap of 70mm, the doors were torn off on landing letting water into the nose wheel bay, the pressure of water caused a bulkhead to fail and the aircraft to sink.
