= Aero Zambia =

Zambian airline

IATA	ICAO	Call sign
Z9	RZL	AERO ZAMBIA
- Commenced operations: 11 April 1996
- Ceased operations: 19 January 2000
- Hubs: Kenneth Kaunda International Airport
- Headquarters: Lusaka, Zambia
- Key people: David Tokoph (Chairman); G Younger (director); Y Mengistu (deputy M.D.)

Aero Zambia was an airline based in Zambia. Aero Zambia replaced the bankrupt Zambia Airways and was admitted as a full member of IATA ( International Air Transport Association )on 11 April 1996. The airline employed 300 staff and flew from Lusaka to destinations such as Johannesburg, Ndola, Nairobi, Harare and Dar es Salaam. They offered Business and Economy Classes. Aero Zambia operated two Boeing 737-200s, 9J-AFU and 9J-AFW which was a Combi version.

== History ==
The airline was founded in 1996.

On 19 January 2000, the Zambian Government closed them down citing concerns with safety. It has been suggested that politics between Aero Zambia chairman, David Tokoph and Zambian Government officials may have also influenced the decision.
