= Trans Polar =

Norwegian charter airline

- Founded: 1970
- Ceased operations: 16 May 1971
- Operating bases: Oslo Airport, Fornebu
- Fleet size: 3
- Headquarters: Oslo, Norway
- Key people: Thor Tjøntveit (founder)

Trans Polar A/S was a Norwegian charter airline which operated between June 1970 and May 1971. The airline operated a fleet of three Boeing 720s and had a close cooperation with Aer Lingus for maintenance. Trans Polar was established by Thor Tjøntveit, although he never held any management positions. The airline was headquartered in Oslo, although most of the flights operated out of Copenhagen, Denmark, which was the base of Spies Rejser, Trans Polar's largest customer. The airline held operating permission from Norway and Denmark, but not Sweden; nevertheless, they operated several illegal flights out of Stockholm.

Trans Polar ceased operations on 16 May 1971 when Boeing Commercial Airplanes seized one of their aircraft for failing to pay installments. After the company's bankruptcy on 23 June, the police undertook a seven-year investigation of the company. The airline had operated eight months with insolvency; with a debt of 33 million Norwegian krone (NOK) it was at the time the largest bankruptcy case in Norwegian history. Tjøntveit was acquitted of charges of deceit in 1978.

== Establishment ==
Trans Polar was a continuation of Tjøntveit's United States-based Trans Polar International, a retailer of general aviation aircraft. Born in Grimstad, Tjøntveit emigrated to the US in 1961 after receiving his pilot's license and became an American citizen in 1965. Trans Polar International agreed on 25 November 1969 to purchase two Boeing 720 jetliners from Eastern Air Lines. The original plans called for transporting new general aviation aircraft to customers around the world. Tjøntveit stated that the first aircraft would be delivered in May 1970 and followed by a second in December, and that Erik Sandberg would start working as vice president in May. The airline planned to hire ten pilots and had signed an agreement with Pan Am for ground handling services. Trans Polar International stated they had made agreements to operate the aircraft transport flights for at least five years.

The plans changed dramatically and Trans Polar was instead incorporated in Norway. It took delivery of used Boeing 720 jetliners from Eastern Air Lines with registration on 4 June 1970. The airline received an operating license on 11 June to fly both cargo and passenger charter services from Norway. The original plans called for passenger flights in and around the weekends to the Mediterranean and freight and maintenance the other days, including transporting strawberries from Belgium to Norway. A maintenance contract was signed with Aer Lingus of Ireland.

== Fleet ==
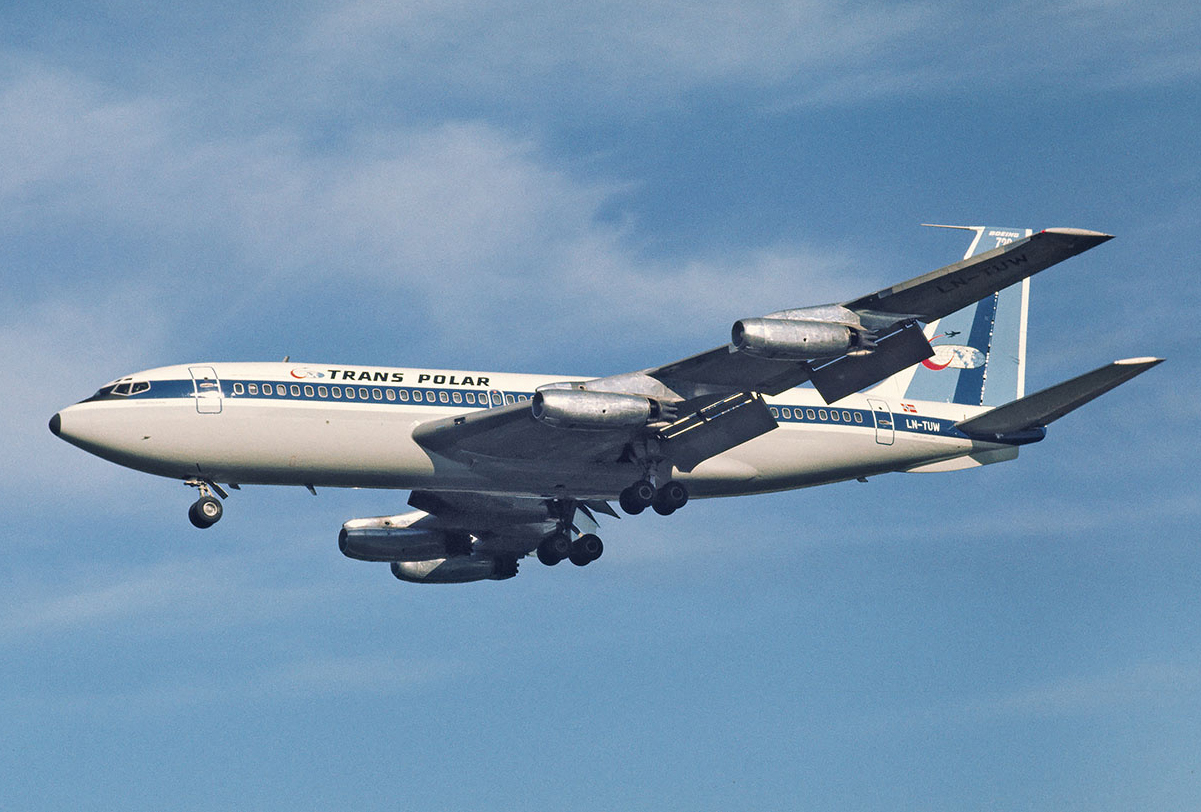
Boeing 720 landing at Stockholm-Arlanda Airport in June 1970

The airline operated a fleet of three Boeing 720s. The first aircraft was registered on 16 June 1970 and the last two on 16 October. They were named for famous aviators; the first aircraft was named Richard Evelyn Byrd and the last two Roald Amundsen and Hjalmar Riiser-Larsen. The aircraft had a seating capacity of 156 or 149.

== Operations ==
=== Securing contracts ===
Trans Polar made a demonstration trip to Stockholm on 13 June 1970—legal because it was without paying customers. The airline applied for permission to operate out of Sweden, but this was rejected by the Swedish Civil Aviation Administration (CAA) and appeals were rejected by the Ministry of Enterprise, Energy and Communications. The reason was that it lacked a permanent organization, did not have sufficient experience in large-scale charter operations and could not document that its charter operations would be based on their own resources. Despite the lack of permission, Trans Polar sub-chartered a round trip from Stockholm to London on 28 June. It then operated four flights from Stockholm to Rhodes, Palma de Mallorca and London between 4 and 6 July. Trans Polar claimed that they were flying courtesy trips and that the passengers had agreed to be compensated the part of the package trip which would have been paid to Trans Polar. The arguments were rejected by the CAA, who stated that this was a typical post-excuse and that in case of a courtesy trip the airline should not be collecting the fare in the first place. The incident was investigated by both Norwegian and Swedish police.

The airline started negotiating a charter contract agreement with the Danish tour operator Spies Rejser in July 1970. Trans Polar offered the operator the use of two Boeing 720s for 55 million Danish krone (DKK), 10 million lower than the incumbent Scanair was bidding, which would allow Spies to transport 140,000 of their annual 250,000 passengers. As the first aircraft was bound to existing operations, Trans Polar would have to procure two additional aircraft for the contract, as well as receive operating permission in Denmark. Trans Polar and Spies signed a contract in mid-August for one weekly service from Copenhagen to Gran Canaria, while another weekly contract was awarded to Maersk Air. Negotiations for the main contract started on 5 September; Scanair had stated a minimum price it could accept, largely based on the fact that Spies did not have an alternative operator. The successful negotiations with Trans Polar also included an agreement with Spantax, who each could offer Spies 70,000 seats for the season. The contract brought annual revenue of DKK 25 million to Trans Polar. To fly the operations, two ex-Aer Lingus Boeing 720s were registered on 16 October. The company later signed agreements with the Danish tour operators Karavan-rejser and Danmarks Internasjonale Studentkomite (DIS).

Trans Polar issued new shares worth NOK 825,000 on 25 November 1970. At the same time, the airline's shareholders issued guarantees to the bank for NOK 1.2 million. This was increased by NOK 300,000 in December. The company was insolvent at this time, but the creditors chose to instate a lawyer as chairman and continue operations. The airline met with its largest creditors on 25 February in an unsuccessful attempt to refinance the company's debt.

=== Demise ===
Simon Spies, owner of Spies Rejser, speculated in February 1971 that he might merge his airline Conair of Scandinavia with Trans Polar, although he also stated that once his airline received new aircraft it would no longer necessarily need to charter aircraft from other airlines. Trans Polar was subject to a lawsuit by a laid-off pilot which the airline owed NOK 26,600 in pay and compensation for him paying his own connection flights to reach Trans Polar charters. The company had issued several cheques and bills of exchange that had bounced and the pilot threatened to bankrupt the airline unless he was paid. The company responded that he would have a very difficult time bankrupting them and the press should instead write about the airline's future, which they regarded as very bright.

The airline also owed NOK 15 million in installments to Boeing Commercial Airplanes for the first Boeing 720 aircraft. Representatives from Boeing met up at Copenhagen Airport on the evening of 17 May 1971 and removed the altimeter from the aircraft and informed the airport police that they had seized the aircraft by making it not airworthy. The 170 passengers who had bought trips through Spies were only marginally delayed because Conair was able to ready one of their own aircraft in three hours. The preparedness was due to Spies' concern of the Norwegian airline's inability to perform. Trans Polar's managing director Knut Borgen called Boeing's seizure "a misunderstanding," but nevertheless Boeing took over formal ownership of the aircraft two days later, and the aircraft was re-registered on 24 May. The other two aircraft were at the time stationed at Dublin Airport where they were undergoing maintenance and could not be used as reserves.

Spies canceled their contract with Trans Polar on 21 May 1971. Simon Spies stated that they had been "endlessly generous" towards the Norwegian airline, and that they had suffered numerous delays ultimately caused by the airline's financial shortcomings. Conair had taken delivery of five equivalent aircraft and the company was therefore able to operate its own flights. Trans Polar had plans to quickly return to operations: the two remaining aircraft would be returned to Aer Lingus and three new aircraft would be purchased. This would be financed through conversion of debt to share capital and new investments from various shipping companies. Borgen emphasized that the market price for leasing aircraft had fallen and that the airline therefore could operate at a lower cost with new leasing contract. Once the airline was back on its feet, he believed Spies would return as a customer. Trans Polar informed its remaining customers on 22 May that it would terminate its flights.

The airline unsuccessfully scrambled to continue operations. A contract with Drammen-based Hercules and its Hamburg, West Germany-based subsidiary secured Trans Polar new operations, this time flying guest workers between West Germany and Turkey four times per week. Tjøntveit claimed on 2 June 1971 that he had secured new financing from British investors, who along with Norwegian shipping companies would purchase newly issued shares in the company. He also confirmed that the two Boeing 720s would return to Aer Lingus and plans for two new Boeing 707 aircraft to be purchased in time for planned operations to commence on 2 July.

== Bankruptcy ==
Boeing issued a petition for bankruptcy 22 June 1971, which was carried out by Oslo District Court the following day. The two remaining Boeing aircraft were re-registered with Aer Lingus on 10 June. By late August the debt in the company had been assessed to NOK 30 million, making it the largest bankruptcy till then in Norwegian history. The largest creditor was Boeing, which was owed NOK 7 million. The creditors and shareholders lost all of their investments in the company because the airline's limited assets were used to pay outstanding wages. Tjøntveit stated on 8 September that he intended to sue Boeing for damages from the seizure of the aircraft, but by October no writ of summons had been received by the manufacturer.

A police investigation was initiated in October 1971 to uncover any criminal action taken by the company. Tjøntveit announced in December 1971 that he had established a new airline—Norwegian Overseas Airways (NOA)—which intended to operate freight routes using the Lockheed L-100 Hercules. The police investigation quickly established that there were shortcomings in Trans Polar's bookkeeping and that there were several violations of aviation regulations. However, they police had difficulty establishing who was responsible in the company. As Tjøntveit was no longer a Norwegian citizen, he was prohibited from holding management and board positions in the airline. Still, it was obvious that he had been calling the shots. Because NOA could not obtain Scandinavian operating permits, it moved its operations to Bangladesh—hindering the police from interviewing Tjøntveit and other central managers in Trans Polar who had joined the new airline. The police also stated that the investigation took too long because they had too few investigators with expertise in financial crime.

The long investigation time span was causing problems for the prosecutors as an increasing number of the counts were meeting their statutes of limitations. The police announced in September 1973 that they were working on indictments towards Tjøntveit and two of the creditors who placed their representatives on the board after the company was insolvent. The police investigation was concluded in May 1975. By then, the statutes of limitations for the accounting issues had passed, and the police focused on the more serious charge of debt manipulation. Tjøntveit and two board members were indicted in 1976. The managing committee for the winding-up released its report in November 1977; the report concluded that although the company's books showed assets of NOK 8.6 million, in reality it only had fifty Norwegian krone. The committee further criticized the company for having too low a share capital, lack of qualified management and insufficient competence in operation and management of large aircraft.

The indictment against the two board members was dropped in 1977, and only a single issue, regarding the disappearance of NOK 1.8 million from the books though a cheque swindle, was retained against Tjøntveit. The long waiting time caused Verdens Gang to describe the case as a "justice scandal." The court case started at Oslo District Court on 13 November 1978. Only two of the seven counts were related to Trans Polar; the others regarded other business transaction undertaken by Tjøntveit, such as selling aircraft he did not own. During the court proceedings, the prosecutor withdrew all counts related to Trans Polar. Tjøntveit was acquitted on 30 November, but the court stated that the police had good reason to investigate the airline and had understanding of the long time frame, pointing to the fact that there were practically no accounts and difficulties interviewing the involved parties. The court also took into consideration that Tjøntveit was an aviator and had no education in management. Tjøntveit followed up by suing the state for NOK 2.8 million in damages, but the case was dismissed by Oslo District Court in September 1979.
