= Janus Airways =

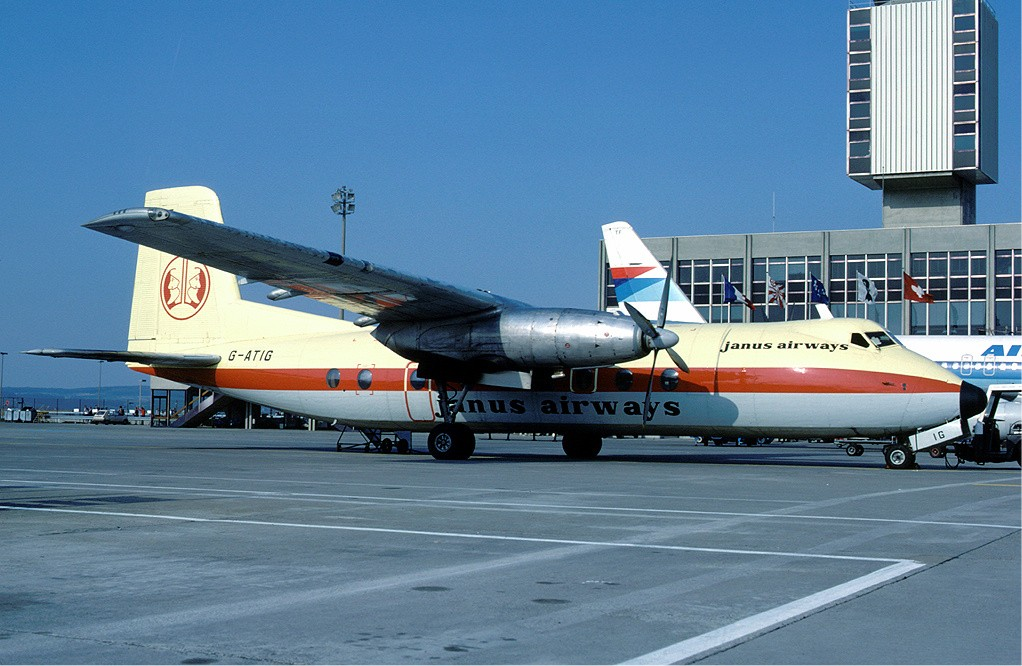
- Handley Page Dart Herald
- Founded: 1982
- Commenced operations: January 1983
- Ceased operations: March 1986 (merged operations into Euroair)
- Hubs: Lydd Airport, Coventry Airport
- Parent company: Hards Travel Service
- Headquarters: Lydd Airport - Romney Marsh (Kent)
- Key people: C.G. Hards Chairman

Janus Airways Ltd. was an airline, formed by Hards Travel Service for inclusive tours. It operated until March 1986, when all flight operations were merged into those of Euroair.

== History ==
Janus Airways came into being in mid-1982 at the initiative of Cliff Hard, principal of Solihull-based Hards Travel Service. The airline, so named after the mythical god of new ventures, was formed solely to facilitate the inclusive tour operations, for which a 50-seat Handley Page Dart Herald was purchased. Having obtained the required AOC in December, the first commercial service got underway on 2 January 1983, carrying a winter sports party to Ostend (Belgium), while regular services to Beauvais (France) began a week later. Daily operations to both cities were commenced at the beginning of May. A successful first summer season, with an average load factor of 93%, led into an enlarged winter sports programme offering flights to Basle, Saarbrücken and Dijon, which commenced in mid-December.

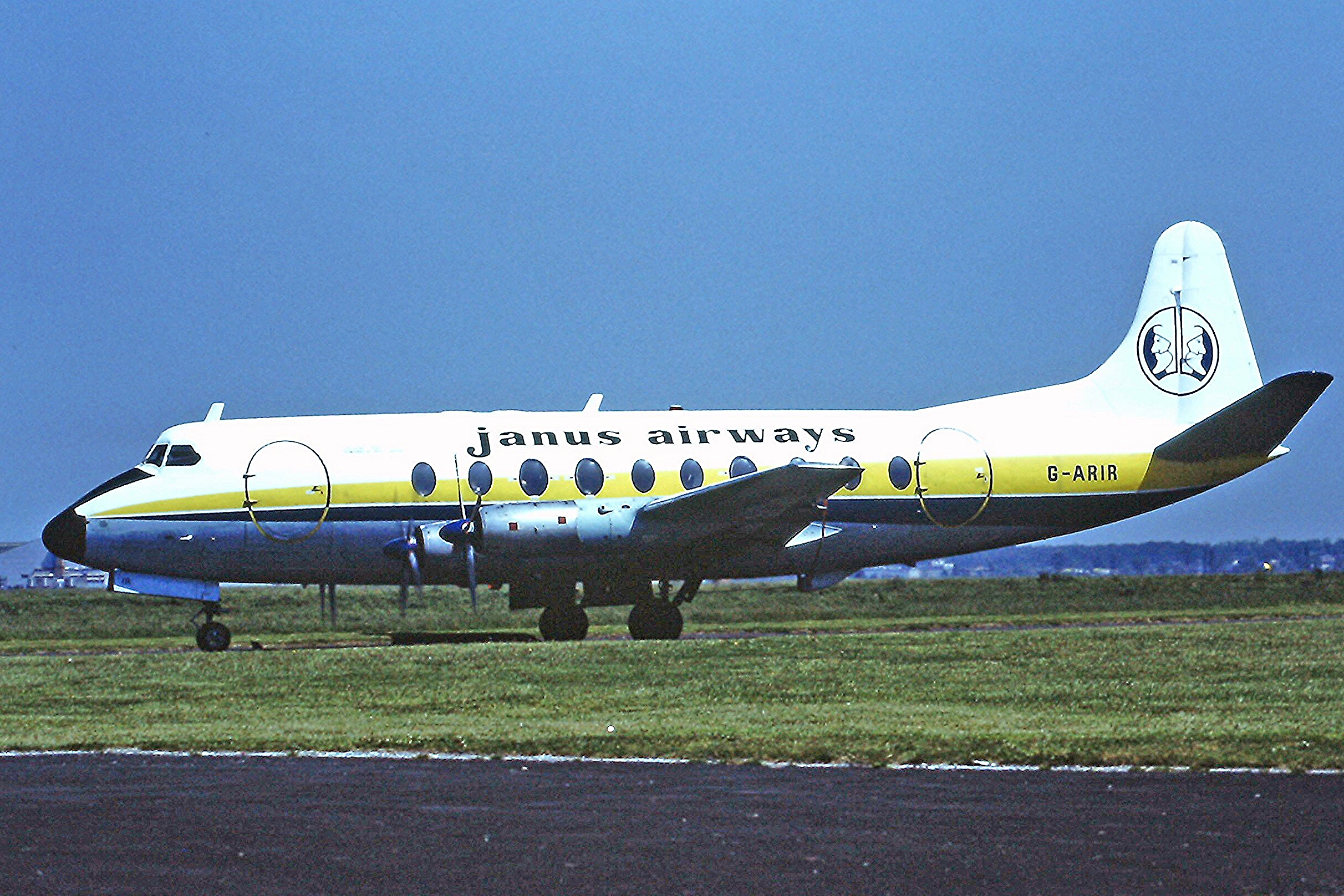
Vickers Viscount 700, 1984

Encouraged by 1983 results, Janus bought three Vickers Viscount series 700 in time for the next summer operations. In the event, only two of the Viscounts were viable. On 2 May, Janus extended its popular coach-air services to the Midlands by flying from Coventry Airport to Beauvais. However, traffic on this sector did not live up to expectations and the Viscounts were sold at the end of the season, the final commercial service being flown on 31 October 1984.

Disappointing advance bookings to Spanish resorts led to Coventry being dropped for the 1985 summer programme and thus, Janus reverted to its established coach-air services from Lydd, with a single Herald. Early in March 1986, the operation was taken over by Euroair, which maintained existing services, albeit at reduced frequency. Not entirely unexpectedly, Hards Travel was placed in liquidation early in August, signalling the cessation of the residual Janus own flights, the last of which was on the afternoon of 7 August.

== See also ==
- List of defunct airlines of the United Kingdom
