= ZAS Airline of Egypt =

Egyptian airline (1982–1995)

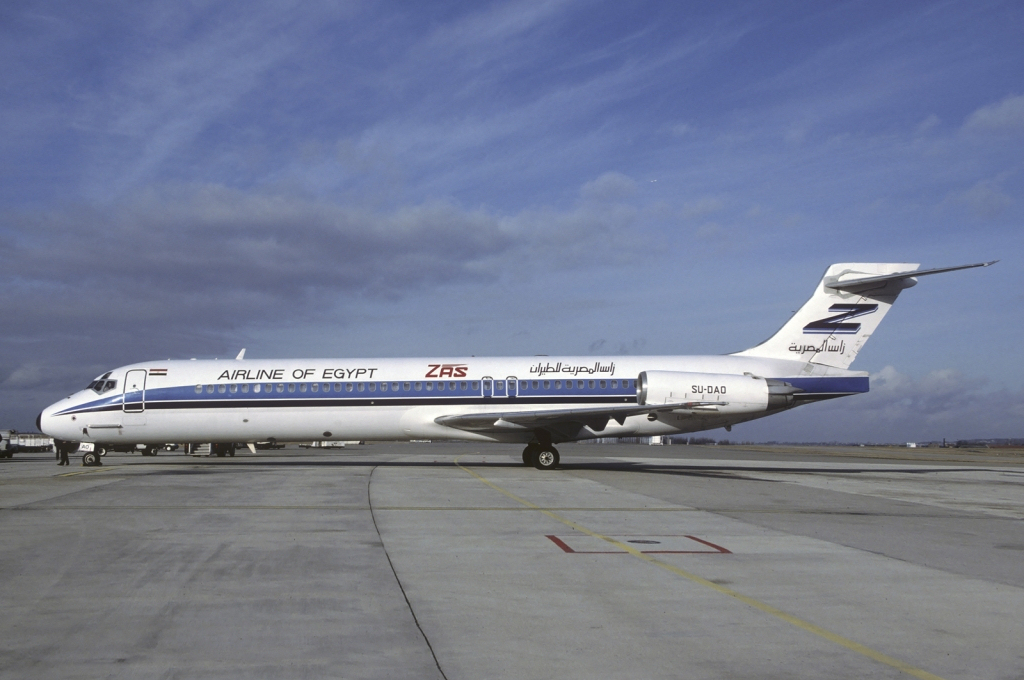
- ZAS McDonnell Douglas MD-87
IATA	ICAO	Call sign
ZA	ZAS	ZAS AIRLINES
- Founded: 1981
- Commenced operations: November 23, 1982
- Ceased operations: April 1995
- Operating bases: Cairo; Amsterdam
- Fleet size: 25 (during operations)
- Headquarters: Cairo, Egypt
- Key people: Sherif Zarkani, Emir Zarkani

ZAS Airline of Egypt (IATA: ZA, ICAO: ZAS, call sign: ZAS airlines) was an airline from Egypt that operated between 1982 and 1995.

== Company history ==
ZAS Airline of Egypt was founded by two brothers, Sherif and Emir Zarkani, as a freight airline. Operations began on November 23, 1982, with a flight from Cairo to Amsterdam to London. Their first flight was to Amsterdam, as both brothers lived in Holland for a portion of their childhood. In 1987, ZAS was granted a license to carry passenger charter operations. Flights to Jeddah for the Hajj began that year. Then, flights to Western Europe began.

ZAS operated a variety of aircraft, from old Boeing 707s to modern MD-87s and Airbus A300s. The Gulf War of 1990-91 brought a downturn in the Egyptian tourist business and ZAS was heavily affected. Sometime in the 1990s, the government wanted to nationalize the airline, but Sherif and Emir refused to, so the government greatly increased their taxes and occasionally cut the water and electricity supply to their homes. After increasing difficulties, all operations ceased in April 1995.

== Fleet details ==
- 3 - Boeing 707-328(C) original delivery to Air France
- 1 - Boeing 707-328(B) original delivery to Air France
- 2 - Boeing 707-336(C) original delivery to BOAC
- 2 - Boeing 707-338(C) original delivery to QANTAS
- 1 - Boeing 707-365(C) original delivery to British Eagle Int Airlines
- 1 - Boeing 707-366(C) original delivery to Egyptair
- 2 - Boeing 707-351(C) original delivery to Northwest Airlines
- 1 - Douglas DC-9-32 original delivery to Inex Adria
- 1 - Douglas DC-9-33(RC) original delivery to Inex Adria
- 1 - MD-83 original delivery to Aero LLoyd
- 1 - MD-87 original delivery to Midway Airlines
- 1 - MD-82 original delivery to Adria Airways
- 1 - MD-82 original delivery to ZAS
- 1 - MD-83 original delivery to Aero Lloyd
- 3 - Airbus A300B4-120 original delivery to SAS
- 2 - Airbus A300B4-203 original delivery to Air France
- 1 - Airbus A300B4-203 original delivery to South African Airways
