= Eastern Provincial Airways Flight 102 =

1965 aviation accident in Canada

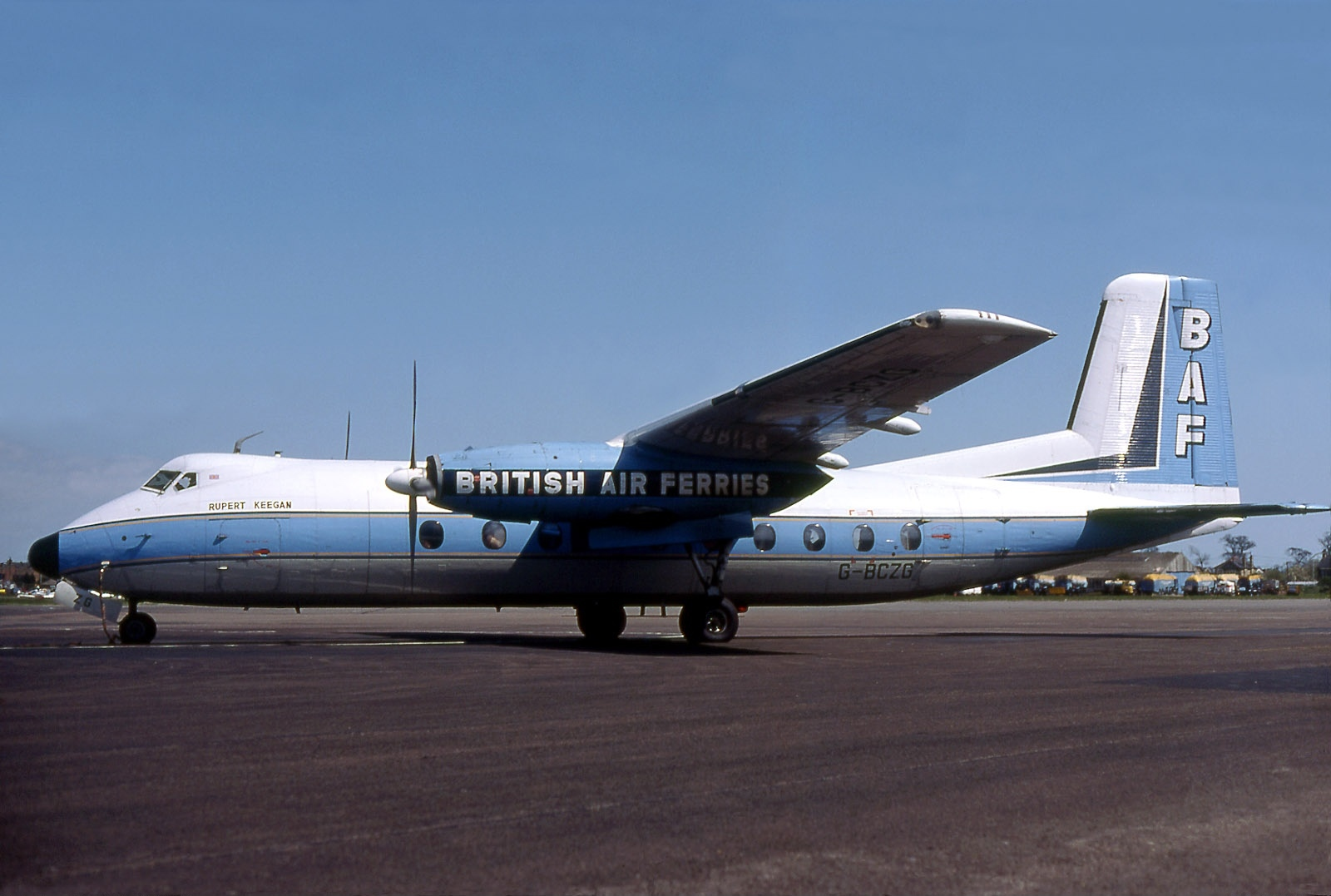
- A Handley Page Herald similar to the one involved in the accident

Accident
- Date: March 17, 1965
- Summary: In-flight breakup caused by severe corrosion
- Site: Musquodoboit, Nova Scotia, Canada

Aircraft
- Aircraft type: Handley Page HPR-7 Herald 202
- Operator: Eastern Provincial Airways
- IATA flight No.: PV102
- ICAO flight No.: EPA102
- Call sign: PROVINCIAL102
- Registration: CF-NAF
- Flight origin: Halifax Stanfield International Airport, Halifax, Nova Scotia, Canada
- Destination: JA Douglas McCurdy Sydney Airport, Reserve Mines, Nova Scotia, Canada
- Occupants: 8
- Passengers: 5
- Crew: 3
- Fatalities: 8
- Survivors: 0

On March 17, 1965, a Handley Page Dart Herald operating as Eastern Provincial Airways Flight 102 crashed into terrain during a domestic flight in Musquodoboit, Nova Scotia, Canada, killing all eight occupants. The crash was the first fatal incident involving a Handley Page Dart Herald, and the first accident of the type other than the crash of the prototype in 1958.

== Background ==
=== Aircraft ===
The aircraft involved in the accident was CF-NAF, a Handley Page HPR-7 Herald 202 manufactured in 1962 and operated by Eastern Provincial Airways. It was powered by two Rolls-Royce Dart turboprop engines. At the time of the accident, the aircraft had accumulated a total of 4,135 fight hours.

The maintenance history of the aircraft showed no evidence of structural damage or damage to the engines or flight controls. Only the occurrence of vibrations in the tail was noted.

=== Passengers and crew ===
Five passengers and three crew members were on board. The crew were the 45-year-old pilot, 42-year-old co-pilot and a flight attendant. The pilot logged 20,200 hours of flight hours, while the co-pilot logged 11,960, including over 1,000 on the Handley Page Dart Herald.

=== Weather ===
On the day of the accident, weather conditions were favorable. Visibility at Halifax Airport was 20 miles (approximately 32 kilometers). The temperature was 26 °F (approximately -3 °C), with scattered clouds at an altitude of 12,000 feet (approximately 3,660 meters). The wind was blowing from 30 degrees at 14 miles per hour (approximately 22.5 km/h). There was no significant wind shear in the region, so only minor turbulence was expected along the flight path.

== Flight and crash ==
The aircraft took off on a domestic flight from Halifax Stanfield International Airport in Goffs, Nova Scotia, Canada, en route to JA Douglas McCurdy Sydney Airport in Reserve Mines, Nova Scotia, with several intermediate stops. They were scheduled to land at Sydney Airport at around 9:59 a.m. As the aircraft climbed from 11,500 to 12,000 feet near Musquodoboit, 26 miles northeast of Halifax Stanfield International Airport, following an uneventful flight, it suddenly broke up within seconds. 19 witnesses on the ground later testified that they heard an unusual, loud noise and saw the cockpit section and then the tail section break off from an aircraft flying eastward before the wreckage crashed to the ground at 9:22 a.m. local time, within 45 to 60 seconds. The wreckage landed in a densely wooded area. All eight occupants were killed.

== Investigation ==
During the medical examination of the crash victims, traces of carbon monoxide were found, initially leading to the hypothesis that the crew might have become incapacitated in flight. This hypothesis was later rejected when clinical tests revealed that the concentration of carbon monoxide in the victims' blood was not high enough to cause incapacitation. Ultimately, a heating pipe that had been hung on the cabin door at Halifax Airport to prevent the cockpit from cooling down while the aircraft was on the ground was identified as the likely source of the carbon monoxide.

The examination of the wreckage revealed that the underside of the fuselage had been subject to progressive internal corrosion for an extended period. During flight, the underside of the fuselage ripped open along the 32nd stringer, which runs along the centerline of the fuselage underside, starting approximately at the transition from the cockpit to the cabin area and proceeding aft. The structural failure in flight progressed from front to rear. The fuselage skin deformed so severely that it was ultimately struck by one of the propellers.

The report of vibrations in the tail section was also thoroughly investigated, especially since it was discovered that the left horizontal stabilizer had broken off from the aircraft ahead of the vertical stabilizer and the fuselage, behind the rear pressure bulkhead. It was therefore initially assumed that the structural failure originated in the tail section. However, since no small pieces of wreckage from the tail area were found at the beginning of the debris field, this theory was ultimately rejected.

The exact cause and type of corrosion could ultimately not be determined.

The maximum cabin operating pressure for Herald series 200/400 aircraft was reduced from 4.2 to 3.0 psi as a precautionary measure.

== See also ==
- 1965 Royal Jordanian Handley Page Dart Herald crash
