= Air Commerz =

German charter airline, 1970–1972

IATA	ICAO	Call sign
none	DX	AIRCOMER
- Founded: June 1970
- Commenced operations: June 1970
- Ceased operations: September 1972
- Operating bases: Düsseldorf Airport
- Hubs: Hamburg Airport
- Headquarters: Hamburg, Germany

Air Commerz was a German charter airline that operated for a short time between 1970 and 1972.

== History ==
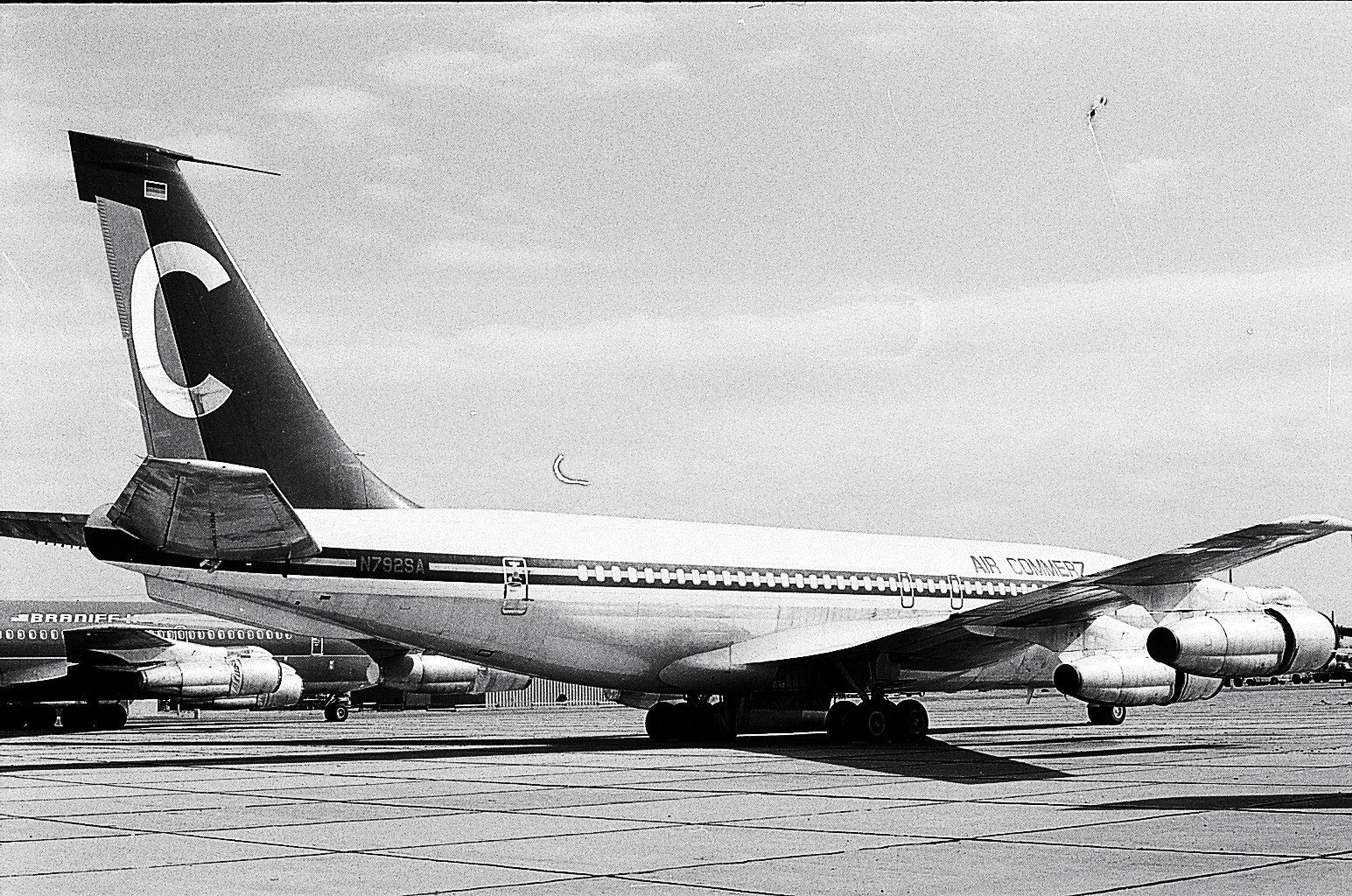
Boeing 707-138B stored at Marana in 1975

Air Commerz was set up in Hamburg in March 1970. The airline got the first of its two Vickers Viscounts from Aer Lingus in March and commenced operations in that same month. The airline's official home base was Düsseldorf Airport although most flights were flown out of Hamburg Airport. The operations were all charters.

In March and May 1971 Air Commerz received two second-hand Boeing 707. The jets were introduced into service in June 1971 on a flight from Hamburg to Reims. Due to financial problems the airline ceased operations in early September 1972. Air Commerz was dissolved in January 1973.

== Fleet ==
- 2 Vickers Viscount 800
- 2 Boeing 707-138B
