= Maritime Central Airways =

Canadian airline, 1941–1963

IATA	ICAO	Call sign
-	-	-
- Commenced operations: 1941
- Ceased operations: 1963
- Subsidiaries: Nordair
- Headquarters: Moncton, New Brunswick, Canada
- Key people: Carl Burke; Josiah Anderson

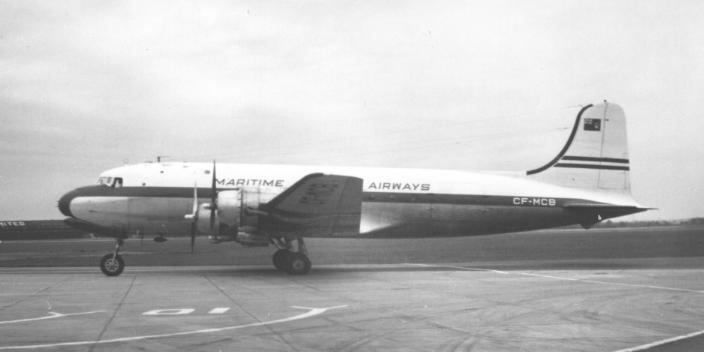
Douglas DC-4 Skymaster of Maritime Central Airways at Manchester England in 1956

Maritime Central Airways was a predecessor of Eastern Provincial Airways and was founded by Prince Edward Island native Carl Burke and Josiah Anderson in 1941 out of Moncton, New Brunswick and provided standard passenger, cargo, and charter flights throughout the Maritimes and Newfoundland and Labrador - at the time not yet part of Canada. This early fleet consisted of a Boeing 247 and a Fairchild 24.

== Wartime operations ==
MCA participated in the Second World War effort with various projects, including a search and rescue mission for the U.S. government in Greenland in 1942 that caused the loss of one Barkley-Grow T8P-1.

This charter was typical of the mixed-bag operations that most Canadian carriers, including MCA, survived on: in addition to the scheduled passenger runs we are familiar with today.

== Early postwar history ==
By 1946, the fleet had grown to include a Douglas DC-3, de Havilland Rapide, Lockheed Model 10 Electra, Cessna Crane, and PBY Canso. In addition to passenger and cargo runs in the Maritimes, MCA tasks in the late 1940s consisted of a twice weekly service to the Magdalen Islands, carrying mail, seal surveys in the Gulf of St. Lawrence and off the coast of Labrador, ice patrols, and charters from Charlottetown and Yarmouth to bring lobsters to Boston and New York. In 1948 alone, MCA carried almost two million pounds of freight and its fleet had grown to two DC-3s, 1 Canso, 4 Lockheed 10, 1 de Havilland Rapide, 2 Cranes, and 2 Stinsons.

== The 1950s and closure ==
The 1950s were another period of tremendous growth for MCA. By 1953, MCA was the third largest carrier in Canada. MCA launched the first air service to the French island of St-Pierre and won contracts to provide air transportation for seventeen of forty-two Distant Early Warning Line (DEW) Stations being built in the Canadian north. By the time the DEW projects were finished, MCA had added a Vickers Viscount, Bristol Freighter, Avro York, Douglas DC-4 and Douglas DC-6 to its fleet. Post-DEW line work included such far-flung charter jobs as a four-year contract transporting Hungarian refugees and several trips shipping monkeys from India and Pakistan.

On August 11, 1957, tragedy struck when Maritime Central Airways Flight 315, a DC-4 loaded with members of the Imperial Veterans of Toronto who were returning from vacations in the UK, crashed near Issoudun, Quebec. All 79 people aboard were killed. Also in 1957, MCA set-up Nordair as a subsidiary with operations based at Dorval in Montreal. Nordair, soon on its own from MCA, would go on to become a major Canadian regional carrier in its own right before being absorbed by Canadian Pacific Air Lines in the mid-1980s.

== See also ==
- List of defunct airlines of Canada
