= Invicta International Airlines =

UK charter airline

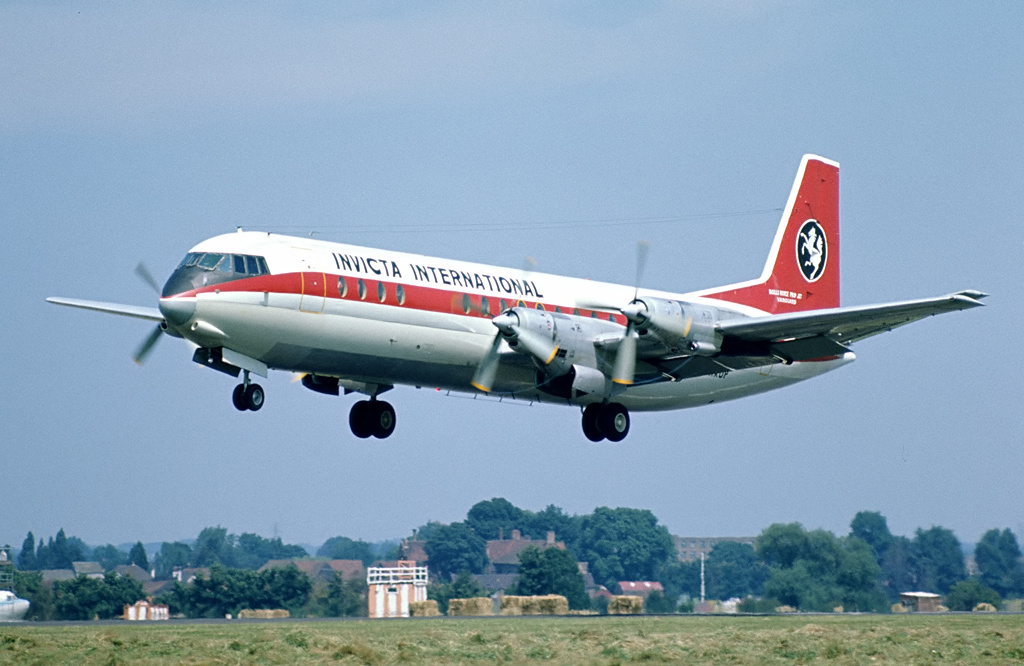
- Vickers 952 Vanguard
IATA	ICAO	Call sign
IM	-	INVICTA
- Founded: November 1964 (as Invicta Airways)
- Commenced operations: 20 March 1965 (as Invicta Airways)
- Ceased operations: 8 April 1982 (as Invicta International)
- Operating bases: Manston Airport, Kent
- Key people: Hugh Kennard, Audrey Kennard

Invicta International Airlines Ltd was a charter airline with its head office on the grounds of Manston Airport in the United Kingdom. It operated non-scheduled passenger and freight services between 1965 and 1982.

== History ==
=== Invicta Airways (1964–69) ===
Invicta Airways Limited was founded in November 1964 by Hugh Kennard following a takeover of his previous company, Air Ferry. A provisional base was established at Ramsgate Airport. Two Vickers Viking aircraft were purchased from Autair International Airways (later Court Line) on 12 February 1965, G-AHPL and G-AHOY. Two Douglas DC-4 aircraft were purchased from British Eagle International Airlines, G-ASPM on 18 February and G-ASPN on 20 February.

Crew training took place from 3 March and the first revenue earning flight took place on 20 March when one of the Vikings flew a charter flight to Basle, Switzerland. On 30 March, one of the DC-4s operated the first revenue earning freight, carrying 8 tons (8,100 kg) of lamb carcasses to Metz Airport for the Royal Canadian Air Force.

A former employee of Invicta, Cornelius Donovan, sued them for £1,500 damages claiming that Invicta had wanted him to fly aircraft in "illegal and dangerous" circumstances. Donovan had been employed in 1965 and the aircraft in question were Vikings G-AHPL and G-AHOY. Invicta counter-sued for £2,151 in lost flights and charters, denying Donovan's allegations. The case was found in favour of Invicta.

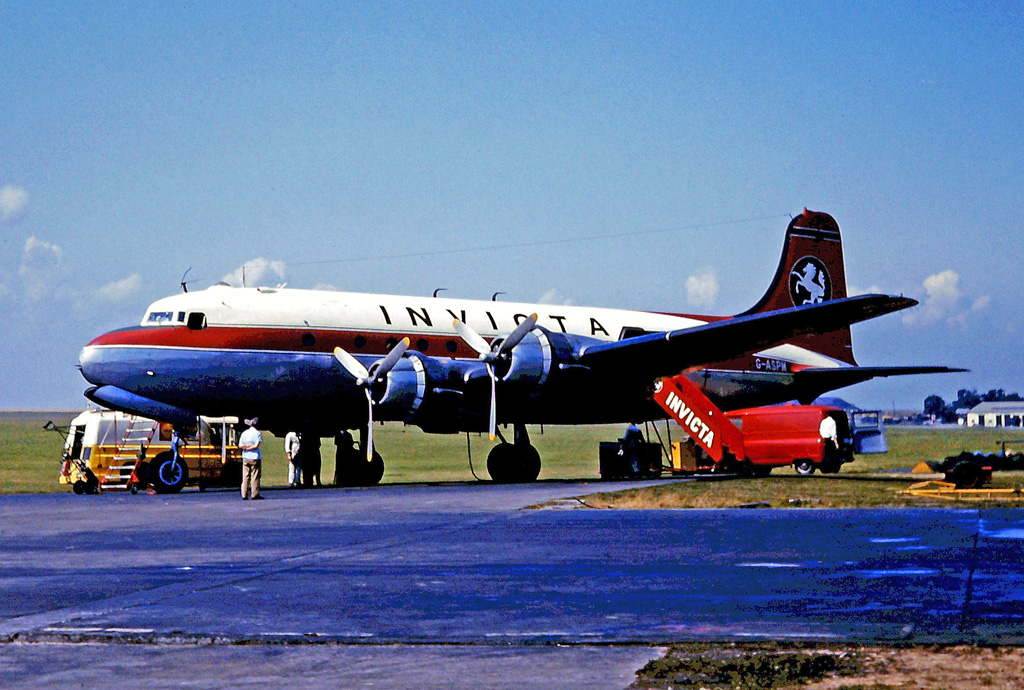
Douglas DC-4 at Manston Airport in 1965

Air Ferry ceased using the Viking in January 1966, and the purchase of three of their aircraft was negotiated, G-AIVD, G-AIVF and G-AOCH being acquired. G-AIVD never flew for Invicta, having been purchased solely as a spares source. In April, DC-4s G-APID, G-ASEN and G-ASZT were leased, all three joining the fleet by 7 April. Following the accident to G-APID on 20 June, DC-4 G-ARWK was dry-leased from Lloyd International Airways between 29 June and 31 August.

In 1967, DC-4 G-APID was sold, leaving Invicta on 28 February and joining Spantax. It suffered a collapsed nosewheel in March 1967 and was subsequently withdrawn from use. By December 1976, G-APID was in use as the "Aerolandia" snack bar at Seville, Spain. Viking G-AHOW was withdrawn from use after Easter, being scrapped later in the year. It was still in existence in September, parked in a corner of the car park at Manston where people were able to view the interior on payment of a small fee. DC-4 G-ASZT was returned to Autair on 29 September.

On 1 February 1968, Vickers Viscount G-AOCC was delivered to Manston, followed by G-AOCB on 26 March. Viking G-AIVF was officially withdrawn from use on 3 February, and scrapped in September. Viking G-AOCH was also officially withdrawn from use on this date. The aircraft was scrapped by the end of the year.

It was announced on 3 January 1969 that Invicta Airways was to merge with British Midland, effective 18 March. British Midland was to operate passenger flights using a fleet of 12 Viscounts. Invicta was to operate a cargo service under the name "British Midland - Invicta Cargo" using a fleet of three DC-4s.

=== Invicta International Airlines 1969-82 ===
Within weeks of the merger with British Midland, Kennard had decided that the merger was not working, and in June the air cargo operation was sold back to Kennard. He formed Invicta Airways (1969) Ltd., based around the three DC-4s, G-ASPM, G-ASPN and G-ASEN; the Viscounts having gone to British Midland as part of the merger.

By 1970, the DC-4 was ageing and other aircraft types available had much greater capacity. Plans were made to replace the DC-4s. During July and August, dockworkers across the United Kingdom were on strike, leading to increased air freight business. On 10 October, Vickers Vanguard G-AXNT was leased from Air Holdings, with this aircraft, and the three DC-4s, painted with the logo Invicta Air Cargo, a ltd. company name which had been registered in June.

DC-4 G-ASEN was sold to Wenela on 3 February 1971, arriving at Johannesburg on 4 February. On 1 March, Vanguard G-AXOO was acquired, followed by G-AXOP on 8 May. These aircraft were leased from Air Holdings, and marked up as Invicta International (Invicta International Airlines Ltd. had been established in December 1970), as were all aircraft acquired after this date.

Vanguard G-AZRE was leased from Air Holdings on 27 March 1972. DC-4 G-ASPN was sold to Africair on 18 April, and delivered to Johannesburg. On 2 May, Vanguard G-AXOY was leased from Air Holdings. On 5 September, DC-4 G-ASPM was sold to Africair. This was the last DC-4 on the United Kingdom civil register at the time.

Early in 1973, Invicta's financial situation was critical. Suppliers refused them credit for goods and services. On 15 January, Air Holdings repossessed their five Vanguards, which were all flown to Lydd Airport for storage. In February 1973, European Ferries Group acquired a 76% shareholding in Invicta and reached an agreement with Air Holdings to purchase the Vanguards on a deferred term basis. The aircraft were returned to Manston, but the Certificate of Airworthiness for Vanguard G-AXOO expired on 28 February and was not renewed. The plane was used as a spares source until scrapped later that year.

On 10 April, Vanguard G-AXOP was lost at Solothurn, Switzerland, with 108 fatalities and 37 survivors. Vanguard G-AYFN was leased as a replacement for G-AXOO on 16 April, and purchased on 16 October. Air Canada Vanguards CF-TKA, CF-TKM and CF-TKS were purchased in Canada and broken up there to provide a spares source, the parts being shipped to the United Kingdom. On 3 November, Boeing 720B G-BCBA was delivered to Manston. Middle East Airlines not having taken up an option on the aircraft, which was leased by European Ferries.

On 10 May 1974, Boeing 720 G-BCBA was purchased by European Ferries. During the year, the aircraft was sent to the United States for extra seats and windows to be fitted. The process took two months. On 5 June Vanguard G-BAFK was leased from Air Holdings. On 13 December, Bristol Britannia G-AOVT was leased from Monarch Airlines.

=== 1975 ===
Britannia G-AOVT came off lease on 10 March 1975, and was retired by Monarch. It was preserved at the Imperial War Museum, Duxford. In May, European Ferries announced that they had decided to withdraw from the aviation business by the end of October. Vanguard G-AYRN was sold to Europe Air Service and delivered to Perpignan on 29 August. This was followed by the sale of Vanguards G-AXNT, G-AXOY and G-AZRE. G-AXOY made the last passenger flight of a Vanguard in the United Kingdom on 26 October 1975, a one-hour pleasure flight from Luton. The goodwill and assets of Invicta were purchased in December 1975 by Universal Air Transport Sales Ltd, whose chairman was Hugh Kennard. An agreement was made with IAS Cargo Airlines for Invicta to lease two Britannias.

On 1 January 1976, Britannia G-AOVS was leased from IAS, followed by G-AOVF on 22 January. The lease was on an ACMI (aircraft, crew, maintenance and insurance) basis, with the aircraft operating under IAS callsigns and flight numbers. On 13 June, G-AOVS came off lease and was returned to IAS. On 14 June 1976, Britannia 5Y-AZP was wet-leased from Monarch.

On 7 January 1977, Britannia 308F, 5Y-AZP, was purchased by Invicta, and re-registered G-ANCF three days later. G-AOVF was returned to IAS at the end of September. Britannia G-ANCF operated all Invicta's flights until November 1978. On 2 November, G-AOVF was purchased by Invicta from IAS.

In January 1979, both Britannias were repainted. During the summer, the Broadstairs Water Gala was held, which included an airshow. Invicta was invited to take part, with the result that G-AOVF made a low flypast on three engines and the port side covered in oil. Photographs show that the starboard side was presented to the crowd.

=== 1980s ===
Early in 1980, Invicta was sold to Kenyan businessman Horatio De Gama Rose. Kennard left the company and established a business at Canterbury renovating classic cars. Britannia G-ANCF was withdrawn from use on 30 October 1980, leaving just G-AOVF flying. In December, it was agreed that G-AOVF would be leased out to IAC Cargo Airlines of Zaire. The aircraft was repainted between 30 December 1980 and 2 January 1981, re registered 9Q-CAZ.

Britannia G-AOVF returned off lease on 16 June 1981. De Gama Rose was in talks with Redcoat Air Cargo about selling Invicta to them. This came to nothing as Redcoat collapsed in December 1981. On 8 April 1982, De Gama Rose declared that Invicta was insolvent, and the receivers were called in. The remaining Britannia, G-AOVF, was undergoing a maintenance check as Invicta collapsed was eventually stripped of parts instead.

On 28 August, the aircraft became the property of the Official Receiver. The assets of Invicta were sold to Seabourne Aviation. G-AOVF was later made fit for a ferry flight to Southend, as noted in February 1983. In 1984, it was flown to Cosford and is now preserved at the Aerospace Museum. G-ANCF was dismantled in 1984. it was stored at Kemble and in 2007 it was set to be restored at Liverpool John Lennon Airport.

== Aircraft details ==
=== Vickers Viking ===
G-AHOW

Vickers 498 Viking 1A. c/n 124. First flight 4 October 1946. To British European Airways on 11 October 1946 as G-AHOW, named Vanessa. To Ministry of Civil Aviation on 2 February 1948. Later sold to James Stewart Travel and then passed to G S Sale. Sold on 4 August 1950 to Trans World Charter. Sold on 3 December 1951 to Crewsair, named African Trader. Sold in December 1952 to Eagle Aviation. On 11 January 1953 it was leased to Airwork. Re-registered with military serial XD636 on 10 March, used for trooping duties. Sold on 5 November 1954 to Trek Airways, South Africa. Re-registered ZS-DKI and named Louis Trichardt. On 2 April 1955, the aircraft lost some fabric from a wing. An emergency landing was made at an airstrip near Messina. Sold on 31 July 1958 to African Air Safaris, re-registered G-AHOW and named Skukuza. On 26 November 1959, the airline changed its name to Air Safaris Ltd. Leased on 4 May 1962 to Eros Airline (UK) Ltd. Sold on 6 April 1964 to Air Ferry Ltd. Sold on 28 October 1966 to Invicta. Withdrawn from service in September 1967 at Manston. Officially withdrawn from use on 3 February 1969. Scrapped later that year.

G-AHOY

Vickers 614 Viking Mark 1, c/n 128. First flight on 26 October 1946, then to Ministry of Supply. To British European Airways on 5 November 1946 as G-AHOY, named Vanity. To Ministry of Civil Aviation on 21 July 1947 and stored. Sold on 17 January 1949 to Hunting Air Travel. Sold on 26 February 1958 to Pegasus Airlines, which ceased trading on 25 October 1961. Leased on 10 May 1963 to Autair. On 6 April 1964 it suffered substantial damage in a ground loop at Stansted. Sold on 12 February 1965 to Invicta. Certificate of Airworthiness expired on 15 March 1968. Officially withdrawn from use on 3 February 1969.

G-AHPL

Vickers 610 Viking Mark 1B, c/n 149. First flight on 9 April 1947. To British European Airways on 14 April 1947 as G-AHPL, named Verdant. extensively damaged on 28 August 1949 in a wheels-up landing at Le Bourget. Renamed Lord Anson in 1951. Sold on 10 April 1953 to Eagle Aviation, then on 28 April to Central African Airways Corporation. Re-registered VP-YKK and named Lundi. Sold on 22 December 1958 to Pegasus Airlines, which ceased trading on 25 October 1961. Leased on 14 March 1963 to Autair. Sold on 12 February 1965 to Invicta. Withdrawn from service in May 1967. Certificate of Airworthiness expired on 15 March 1968.

G-AIVF

Vickers 610 Viking Mark 1b. c/n 219. First flight on 16 May 1947. To British European Airways on 30 May as G-AIVF, named Vibrant. Renamed Sir James Somerville on 3 February 1953. Sold on 28 March 1956 to Deutsche Flugdienst and re-registered D-AGIL. Re-registered D-BARI on 2 April 1958. Sold on 15 April 1958 to Balair and re-registered HB-AAN. During 1958 it was leased to the United Nations. On 3 September 1960, the starboard undercarriage failed to retract on take-off from Southend. The aircraft was substantially damaged in the subsequent emergency landing at Basle. Sold on 12 April 1963 to Air Ferry and re-registered G-AIVF. Sold on 23 March 1966 to Invicta. Withdrawn from service in May 1968. Officially withdrawn from use on 3 February 1969 and scrapped in September that year.

G-AOCH

Vickers 610 Viking Mark 1B, c/n 150. First flight on 19 August 1947. To Ministry of Supply on 5 September 1947 as VL231 in Royal Air Force markings. To Royal Australian Air Force on 3 December 1947 as A 82–1. Used as a transport aircraft at the Long Range Weapons Establishment, Woomera. Nose damaged on 17 December 1947. To 34 Squadron, RAAF in May 1948. Returned to the RAF on 29 October 1951, allocated to the Empire Test Pilots' School on 28 December. Damaged on 15 August 1952 when it tipped on its nose again after landing at RAF Chilbolton. Sold on 13 May 1955 to Field Aircraft Services and re-registered G-AOCH. Sold on 6 June 1956 to Dragon Airways. Sold on 13 February 1957 to LTU and re-registered D-AMOR. Re-registered D-BABY on 15 March 1958. Substantially damaged on 19 October 1961 when the port undercarriage collapsed on landing at Rhein-Main Air Base, Frankfurt. Sold on 14 August 1963 to Air Ferry and re-registered G-AOCH. Sold on 23 March 1966 to Invicta. Certificate of Airworthiness expired on 7 July 1968. Officially withdrawn from use on 3 February 1969 and scrapped later that year.

=== Douglas DC-4 ===
G-APID

Douglas C-54A-15-DC, c/n 10408. Delivered on 20 September 1944 to the United States Army Air Forces as 42–72303. Sold in 1947 to California Eastern Airways and re-registered NC54305. Leased in 1952 to Avensa, re-registered YV-V-EVB. Re-registered NC54305 on return to California Eastern Airways. Leased to Transocean Air Lines from 3 July to 2 September 1957. Sold on 24 November 1957 to Independent Air Travel and re-registered G-APID. On 21 December 1957, the aircraft infringed Albanian airspace and was forced to land at Valona Air Base by the Albanian Air Force. Independent Air Travel became Blue Air in April 1959 but was declared bankrupt in October. Sold in November 1959 to Continental Air Services, which became Continental Air Transport in December. Noted in Air Condor colours in November 1960 but not delivered as the airline went bankrupt. Sold to Trans World Leasing. Leased to World Wide, British United Airways, Starways and then Lloyd International Airways, returning to Trans World in March 1962. On 18 October 1962 the aircraft made a wheels-up landing at Speke Airport. Leased to Trans Meridian between July 1963 and January 1965. Leased to Dan-Air between 10 March 1965 and 15 February 1966. Sold on 25 April 1966 to Dunkersloom Ltd. To Invicta on 6 April 1966. Sold to Spantax on 14 August 1967. Withdrawn from use by April 1968. By December 1976 it was in use as the "Aerolandia Snack Bar" at Sevilla. In late 1978 the aircraft was damaged in a gale, and was later broken up.

G-ARWK

Douglas C-54G-1-DO, c/n 35936 Delivered on 12 June 1945 to the United States Army Air Forces as 45-483. Sold in 1954 to United States Steel Corporation and re-registered N904. Leased in December 1956 by Trans American Airways for use during an airlift due to the Hungarian Revolution of 1956. Sold on 16 June 1958 to Charlotte Aircraft Leasing and leased the same day to Seaboard & Western. Returned to Charlotte on 15 September 1958 then leased to Resort Airlines. Leased on 15 October 1958 to Riddle Airlines. Sold in January 1962 to Alaska Airlines. Sold on 3 May 1962 to Lloyd International and re-registered G-ARWK. Sold on 31 December 1965 to IPEC Aviation but not imported to Australia. Leased on 29 June 1966 to Invicta. Off lease on 31 August 1966, to Autair. Sold on 13 November 1967 to All-Air and re-registered D-ADAD. All-air merged on 31 March 1969 with Transportflug, aircraft subsequently named Inn. Sold in August 1969 to Aeroflete, re-registered EC-BSK. Withdrawn from use in 197e. Sold in 1975 to AMAZ, re-registered 9Q-COC. Withdrawn from use in April 1981 at N'Dolo Airport, Kinshasa, Zaire and later scrapped.

G-ASEN

Douglas C-54A-15-DC, c/n 10412 Delivered on 24 September 1944 to the United States Army Air Forces as 42–72307. Returned to Douglas Aircraft Company on 13 June 1946 for conversion to DC-4 standards. To Pan American World Airways on 8 February 1947, re-registered NC88936 and named Clipper Meteor. Sold in 1950 to Canadian Pacific Air Lines, re-registered CF-CPD. Later sold to Cathay Pacific and re-registered VR-HFF. Sold on 22 January 1963 to Starways. Sold in January 1964 to Aviation Overhauls. Leased in May 1964 to Icelandair and re-registered TF-FIM, re-registered G-ASEN when returned to Aviation Overhauls. Leased on 5 November 1964 to ACE Freighters and operated on behalf of Ford Motor Company. Sold on 7 April 1966 to Invicta. Sold on 4 February 1971 to Wenela and re-registered ZS-IJT. Scrapped in 1972 at Bulawayo Airport, Rhodesia.

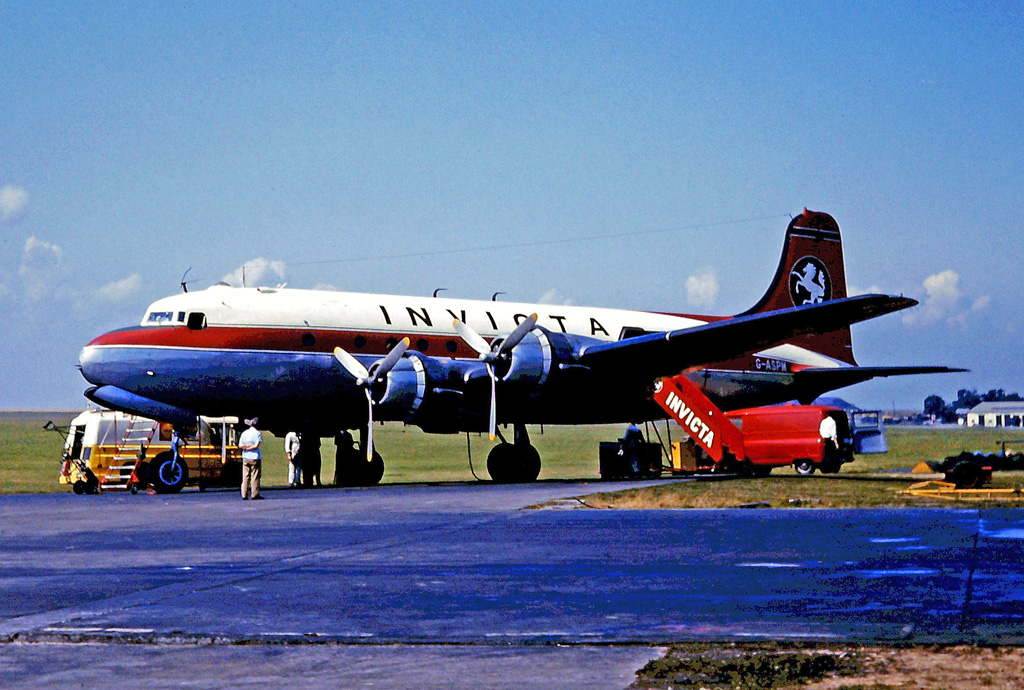
G-ASPM at Manston, 1965

G-ASPM

Douglas C-54B-1-DC, c/n 10543 Delivered on 27 January 1945 to United States Army Air Forces as 42–72438. Sold in March 1946 to Transocean Air Lines, re-registered NC66644. Re-registered N66644 in 1949. Sold in June 1952 to Saudi Arabian Airlines and re-registered HZ-AAI. Sold on 16 February 1964 to British Eagle International Airlines and re-registered G-ASPM. Sold on 18 February 1965 to Invicta. Sold on 5 September 1972 to Africair, re-registered ZS-IRK. Sold later that year to Wenela and withdrawn from use until 1974. Re-registered A2-AAD in 1975. Sold in 1976 to Société Générale d'Alimentation, re-registered 9Q-CWQ. Reported stored at Kinshasa, Democratic Republic of the Congo in 2004.

G-ASPN

Douglas C-54A-10-DC, c/n 10337. Originally destined to be 42-72232 for the United States Army Air Forces but not taken up. Transferred on 1 July 1944 to the United States Navy as R5D-1 Bu39175. Sold in 1948 to Transocean Air Lines, re-registered NC49288. Leased in September 1948 to Pakair, re-registered AP-ADL. Returned to Transocean late in 1949 and re-registered NC49288, named Taloa Tokyo. Sold in June 1952 to Saudi Arabian Airlines and re-registered HZ-AAG. Sold on 6 February 1964 to British Eagle International Airlines and re-registered G-ASPN. Sold on 20 February 1965 to Invicta. Damaged in a gale at Manston on 26 January 1971. Sold on 18 April 1972 to Africair Ltd and re-registered ZS-IRE. Sold in June 1972 to Wenela and re-registered A2-ZGU. Impounded at Blantyre, Malawi. To Société Générale d'Alimentation as 9Q-CBP, later re-registered 9Q-CWP. In 1991, the aircraft suffered an uncontained engine failure at N'djili Airport, Kinshasa, Democratic Republic of the Congo and was withdrawn from use by July of that year.

G-ASZT

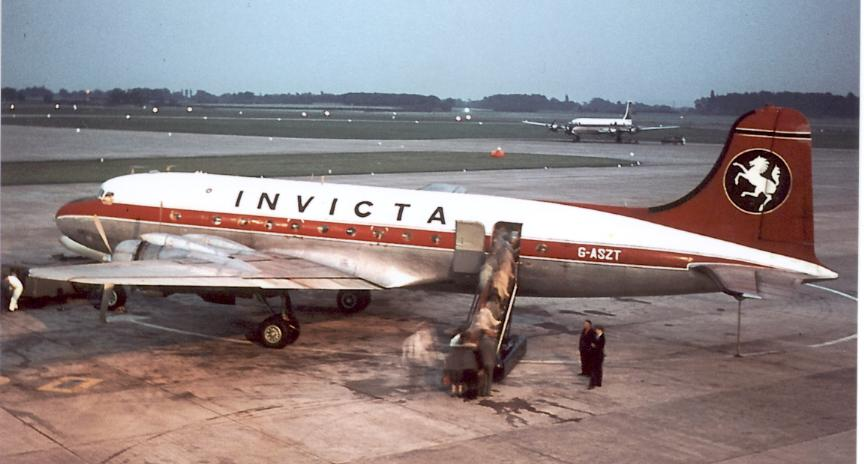
G-ASZT at Manchester Airport, 1966

Douglas C-54D-1-DC, c/n 10640 Originally intended for delivery to the United States Army Air Forces as 42-72535 but transferred to the United States Navy on 26 March 1945 as Bu91997, designated R5D-3. Sold in 1958 to Americada Corporation, re-registered N40434A. Sold later that year to Golden State Airlines. Leased on 1 July 1959 to Slick Airways, returned to Golden State in June 1960. Sold on 9 April 1962 to Seefahrt-u-Transportinteressen GmbH and re-registered D-AMAX. Sold on 22 April 1963 to Flugzeug Handels. Sold in June 1963 to Malta Metropolitan and re-registered VP-MAA. Sold in January 1965 to Autair and re-registered G-ASZT. Sold in August 1965 to Rhodesian Air Services and re-registered VP-YYR. To Air Trans Africa in January 1966 and re-registered 9J-RBL. Sold to Autair on 9 March 1966, then leased to Invicta on 1 April 1966. Returned to Autair on 29 September 1967. Sold on 15 May 1968 to Aero Service Africa and re-registered TN-ABC. Sold on 23 October 1968 to Lina Congo. Sold in September 1974 to SOACO and re-registered TR-LTJ. Sold in 1980 to INCO International and then sold to Air Affaires Gabon in July that year.

=== Vickers Viscount ===
G-AOCB

Vickers 755D Viscount, c/n 92. First flight on 24 May 1956. Intended for delivery to Airwork as G-AOCB but this was not taken up by them. Sold on 5 June 1956 to Cubana de Aviación, re-registered CU-T604. Sold in April 1961 to Eagle Airways (Bermuda) Ltd, re-registered VR-BBL. Sold on 19 September 1962 to Cunard Eagle Airways, re-registered G-AOCB and named City of Edinburgh. Cunard Eagle was renamed British Eagle in September 1963. Aircraft later named City of Belfast. Sold on 26 March 1968 to Invicta. To British Midland Airways on 13 January 1969 due to merger. Withdrawn from use in October 1969 at East Midlands Airport, scrapped in May 1970.

G-AOCC

Vickers 755D Viscount, c/n 93. First flight on 16 June 1956. Intended for delivery to Airwork as G-AOICC but this was not taken up by them. Sold on 20 June 1956 to Cubana de Aviación, re-registered CU-T605. Sold in April 1961 to Eagle Airways (Bermuda) Ltd, re-registered VR-BBM. Sold on 3 September 1962 to Cunard Eagle Airways, re-registered G-AOCC and named City of Belfast. Cunard Eagle was renamed British Eagle in September 1963. Aircraft later named City of Edinburgh. Sold on 1 February 1968 to Invicta, named Sylt. To British Midland Airways on 13 January 1969 due to merger. Withdrawn from use in April 1969 at East Midlands Airport, scrapped in August 1969.

=== Vickers Vanguard ===
G-AXNT

Vickers V952 Vanguard, c/n 737. First flight on 19 April 1961. Delivered on 2 May 1961 to Trans-Canada Air Lines as CF-TKN. Airline changed name to Air Canada on 1 June 1964. Sold on 28 August 1969 to Air Holdings, re-registered G-AXNT. Overhauled by British European Airways in November/December 1969. Leased to Lebanese Air Transport on 5 May 1970, off lease on 8 September. Leased to Invicta on 10 October 1970. Purchased by Invicta on 1 March 1971. Sold on 28 October 1975 to Europe Aero Service, re-registered F-BXOO. Used as a spares source at Perpignan

G-AXOO

Vickers V952 Vanguard, c/n 733. First flight on 19 April 1961. Delivered on 5 May 1961 to Trans-Canada Air Lines as CF-TKJ. Airline changed name to Air Canada on 1 June 1964. Sold on 1 June 1969 to Air Holdings, re-registered G-AXOO. Delivered to Stansted Airport on 17 December, then to Cambridge Airport the next day for storage. Leased in February 1970 to Angkasa Civil Air Transport, re-registered PK-ICC. Off lease in May 1970. Sold to Invicta on 1 March 1971. Certificate of Airworthiness expired on 28 February 1973. Scrapped at Manston in 1977.

G-AXOP

Vickers V952 Vanguard, c/n 745. First flight on 1 May 1962. Delivered on 7 July 1962 to Trans-Canada Air Lines as CF-TKV. Airline changed name to Air Canada on 1 June 1964. Sold on 5 May 1969 to Air Holdings, re-registered G-AXOP and stored at Stansted Airport. Leased on 8 May 1971 to Invicta. Off lease on 1 March 1973 and purchased by Invicta on 5 March. Crashed on 10 April 1973 at Hochwald, Switzerland with the loss of 108 lives.

G-AXOY

Vickers V952 Vanguard, c/n 727. First flight on 24 October 1960. Delivered on 7 December 1960 to Trans-Canada Air Lines as CF-TKD. Airline changed name to Air Canada on 1 June 1964. Sold on 12 August 1969 to Air Holdings, re-registered G-AXOY and stored at Stansted Airport. Leased on 2 June 1970 to Air Viking, re-registered TF-AVA. Off lease on 2 December. Leased on 13 February 1971 to Thor Air Cargo, re-registered TF-JEJ. Off lease on 13 June. Leased on 2 May 1972 to Invicta, re-registered G-AXOY. Intended lease to Silver City Airways from 31 March 1973 was not proceeded with and Invicta bought the aircraft on 1 March. Sold on 5 November 1976 to Europe Aero Service, re-registered F-BXOH. Used as a spares source at Perpignan.

G-AYFN

Vickers V952 Vanguard, c/n 725. First flight on 25 July 1960. Delivered on 7 December 1960 to Trans-Canada Air Lines as CF-TKB. Airline changed name to Air Canada on 1 June 1964. Sold on 12 August 1969 to Air Holdings, re-registered G-AYFN and stored at Cambridge Airport. Leased on 29 March 1971 to Thor Air Cargo, re-registered TF-JES. Off lease on 16 June 1971 then returned to store. Re-registered under Class B markings G-41-172 on 16 May 1972 for test flights at Stansted Airport. Leased on 21 July 1972 to Airtrader, re-registered SE-FTK. Off lease on 8 March 1973. Leased on 14 April 1973 to Invicta and purchased on 16 October 1973. Sold on 29 August 1975 to Europe Aero Service, re-registered F-BXAJ. Withdrawn from use on 17 July 1979 at Perpignan and later scrapped.

G-AZRE

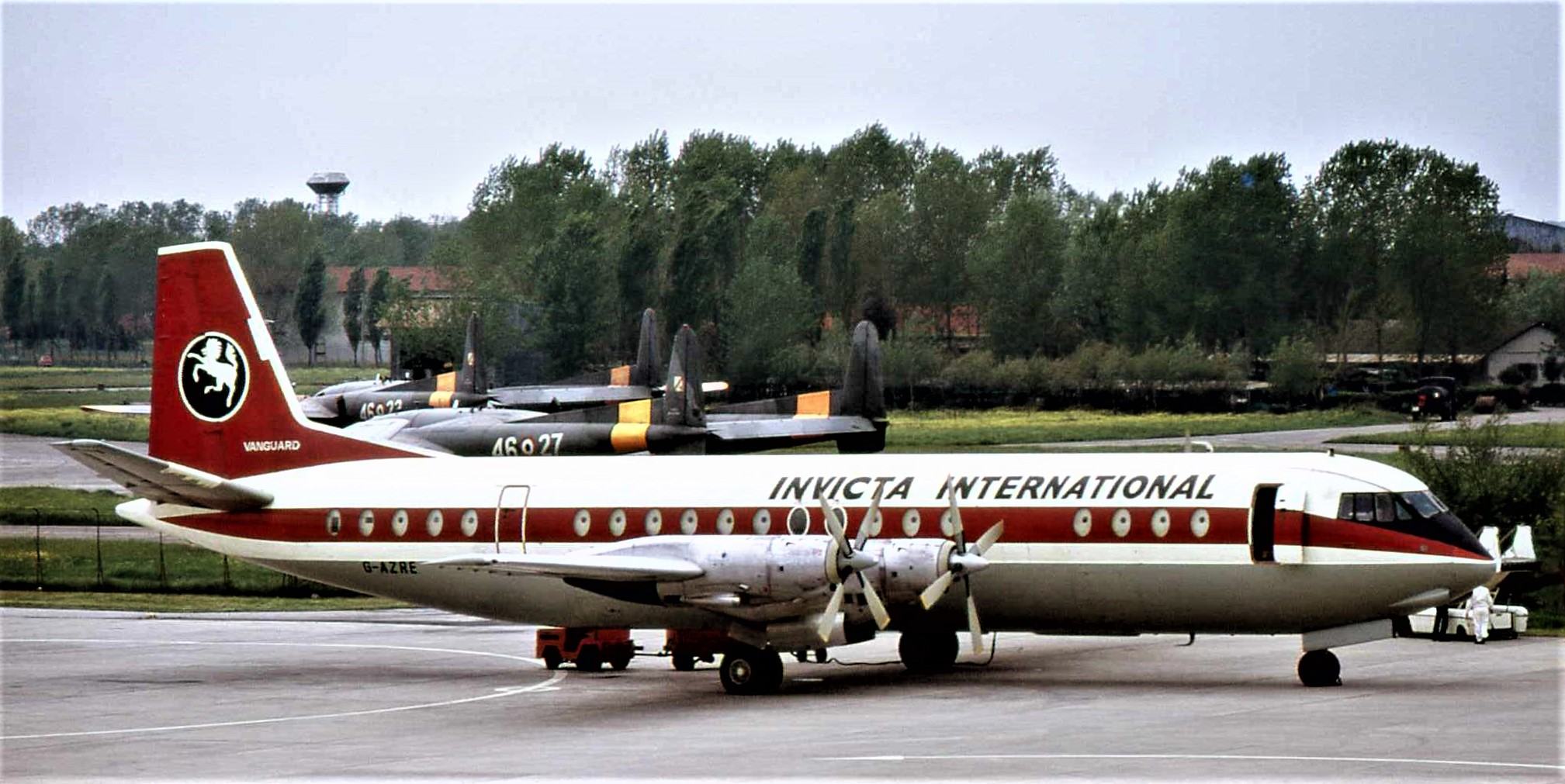
G-AZRE at Pisa Airport in 1974.

Vickers V952 Vanguard, c/n 729. First flight on 19 November 1960. Delivered on 7 January 1961 to Trans Canada Air Lines as CF-TKF. Airline changed name to Air Canada on 1 June 1964. Sold on 18 March 1972 to Air Holdings, re-registered G-AZRE. Leased to Invicta on 27 March 1972 and purchased by them on 1 March 1973. Sold on 11 September 1976 to Europe Aero Service, re-registered F-BXOF. Used as a spares source at Perpignan.

G-BAFK

Vickers V952 Vanguard, c/n739. First flight on 30 May 1961. Delivered on 7 January 1961 to Trans Canada Air Lines as CF-TKP. Airline changed name to Air Canada on 1 June 1964. Sold on 9 December 1969 to Lockheed and stored at Cambridge Airport. Sold on 30 August 1972 to Air Holdings, re-registered G-BAFK. Leased to Templewood Aviation and sub-leased on 23 November 1972 to Merpati Nusantara Airlines, re-registered PK-MVR. Off lease on 28 February 1973. Sold on 5 June 1974 to Invicta, re-registered G-BAFK. Sold on 21 October 1975 to Europe Aero Service, re-registered F-BXOG. Withdrawn from use on 21 December 1975 at Perpignan.

=== Boeing 720B ===
G-BCBA

Boeing 720-023, c/n 18014 First flight on 24 June 1960. Delivered on 24 July 1960 to American Airlines as N7528A Flagship Connecticut. Returned to Boeing on 31 July 1961 for conversion to Boeing 720-023B. On 1 July 1964 substantially damaged by an undercarriage collapse landing at John F Kennedy International Airport, New York. Withdrawn from service in August 1971. Stored at Tulsa and then Beirut waiting to be sold to Middle Eastern Airlines. Leased on 3 November 1971 to European Ferries, re-registered G-BCBA. Operated by Invicta. Purchased on 10 May 1974 by European Ferries. Leased in October 1975 to Tempair and stored at Luton. Sub-leased on 6 February 1976 to Air Niugini, re-registered P2-ANG. Off lease on 2 February 1977 and stored at Luton. Leased on 26 March 1977 to Monarch Airlines and sold to them on 1 September. Leased from 31 January 1978 until May to Cyprus Airways. Leased from 21 September 1979 until January 1980 to Royal Air Maroc. Leased on 20 June 1980 to Air Malta. Sold on 23 October 1981 to Maof Airlines, re-registered 4X-BMA. Operated by Maof for El Al between September 1982 and October 1984, then stored at Tel Aviv. Maof ceased operations on 2 November 1984. Sold in November 1985 to Israel Aerospace Industries. Sold on 26 January 1986 to Omega Air and then sold two days later to Boeing MAC for use as a spares source for United States Air Force KC-135Es, re-registered N341A. Scrapped at Tucson, Arizona in June 1991.

=== Bristol Britannia ===
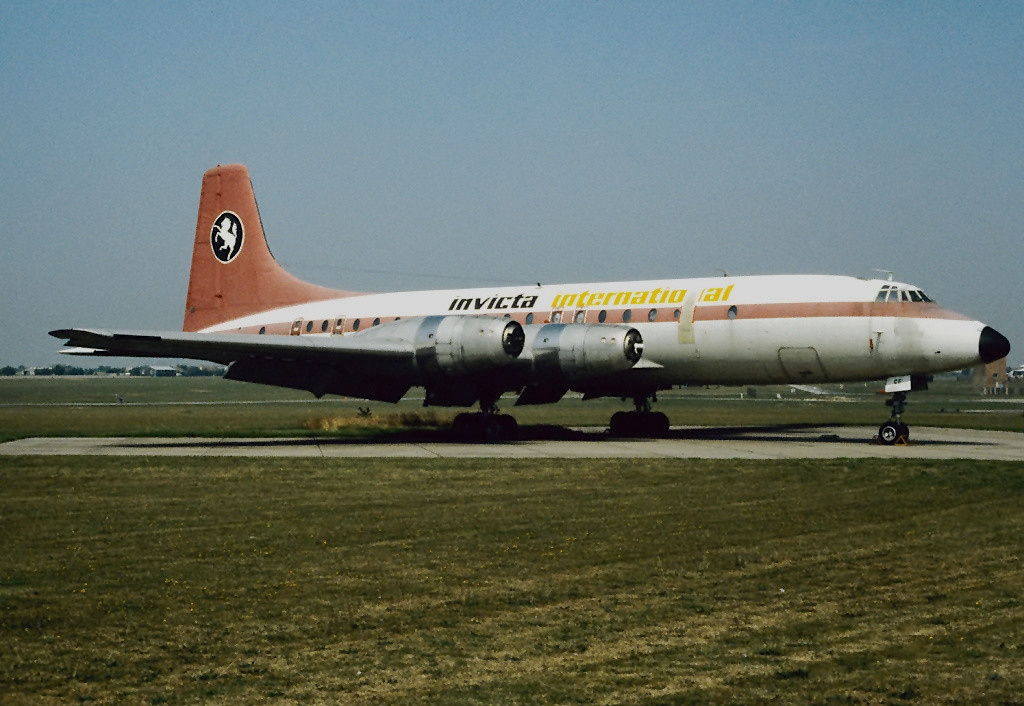
Bristol B-175-308F Britannia

G-ANCF

Bristol 305 Britannia, c/n 12922. First flight on 19 November 1958. Originally destined for British Overseas Airways Corporation but not taken up. Capital Airlines also did not take up an option to purchase and was sold to Northeast Airlines as N6597C, but this too was not taken up. To Bristol as G-ANCF. Later flown under Class B markings G-18-4 and G-14-1. Converted in October 1958 to type 308. Sold on 24 August 1959 to Transcontinental SA, registered LV-PPJ, delivered on 16 December. Re-registered LV-GJB in 1960 and withdrawn from use in November 1961 at Buenos Aires. Sold in January 1962 to British Eagle International Airlines, re-registered G-ANCF. Named New Frontier and later renamed Resolution. Converted in July 1964 to type 308F freighter. Sold on 6 December 1968 to Monarch Airlines. Leased on 9 February 1976 to African Cargo Airways, re-registered 5Y-AZP. Sub-leased on 14 June 1976 to Invicta. Purchased by Invicta on 14 January 1977 and re-registered G-ANCF. Withdrawn from service on 30 October 1980. In 1984 it became part of the Bristol Aero Collection at Kemble. The collection was forced to sell due to loss of accommodation at Kemble in December 2005. In January 2007, it was moved to Speke Airport. The plane is in British Eagle colours.

G-AOVF

Bristol 312 Britannia, c/n 13237 First flight on 18 December 1957. Delivered on 2 January 1958 to British Overseas Airways Corporation as G-AOVF. Sold on 4 March 1964 to British Eagle International Airlines and named Friendship. Converted in 1968 to type 312F freighter. Repossessed on 27 November 1968 by BOAC. Sold on 22 January 1970 to Monarch Airlines. Leased on 21 April 1970 to Donaldson International Airways, named Nike. Purchased by Donaldson on 24 April 1972. Sold on 31 October 1972 to IAS Cargo Airlines, named African Queen. Leased on 1 November 1972 to African Safari Airways, returned to IAS on 19 December. Leased between April 1976 and September 1977 to Invicta then returned to IAS. Purchased on 2 November 1978 by Invicta. Leased on 3 August 1979 to Redcoat Air Cargo. Leased on 6 January 1981 to IAC Cargo Airlines, re-registered 9Q-CAZ. Off lease on 4 June 1981, re-registered G-AOVF and withdrawn from service. Sold on 21 February 1983 to Merchant Air. Donated in May 1984 for preservation at Cosford.

G-AOVS

Bristol 312 Britannia, c/n 13430. First flight on 5 September 1958. Delivered on 29 October 1958 to British Overseas Airways Corporation as G-AOVS. Leased on 4 July 1965 to Lloyd International Airways. Sub-leased on 17 August 1965 to British Eagle International Airlines. Purchased by them on 16 November. converted in June 1966 to type 312F freighter. Sold in January 1973 to IAS Cargo Airlines. Sold on 28 December 1973 to Aviex Holding Ltd, then sold on 14 October 1975 to Westwings Aviation Services Ltd and leased to IAS Cargo Airlines that same day. Sold on 21 March 1977 to Redcoat Air Cargo, named Christian in May 1977. Withdrawn from service in October 1979 at Luton and scrapped. Fuselage still on fire dump at LTN 01/09/21

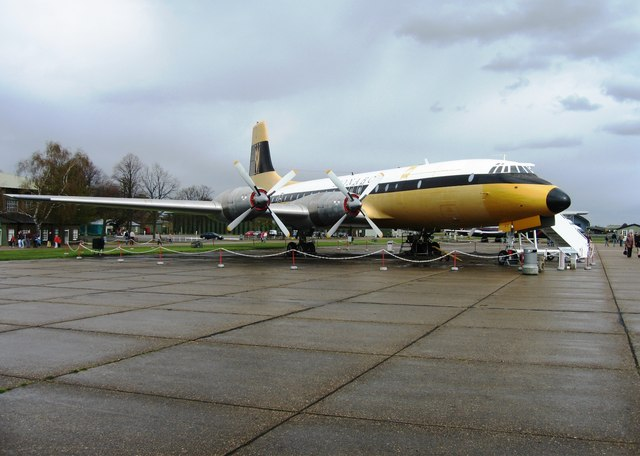
G-AOVT as preserved at Duxford

G-AOVT

Bristol 312 Britannia, c/n 13427 First flight on 17 December 1958. Delivered on 1 January 1959 to British Overseas Airways Corporation. Leased by British European Airways in April and May 1961. Leased on 13 September 1963 to British Eagle International Airlines. Named Enterprise and later renamed Ajax. Purchased by Monarch on 18 August 1968. Leased on 13 December 1974 to Invicta. Off lease on 10 March 1975, returned to Monarch and withdrawn from service. Arrived at Duxford for preservation on 29 June 1975.

== Accidents and incidents ==
- 15 April 1965, Viking G-AHOY tipped on its nose at Manston damaging its propellers and then its tailwheel and the surrounding structure when it fell back. It was later found necessary to change an engine.
- 2 August 1965, Viking G-AHPL tipped onto its nose during a rejected take-off at Manston. Repairs took a month to complete.
- 20 June 1966, DC-4 G-APID suffered the collapse of its nosewheel when taxiing for take-off from Manston.
- 10 April 1973 - Invicta International Airlines Flight 435, a Vickers Vanguard 952 from Bristol Lulsgate to Basle-Mulhouse, ploughed into a snowy, forested hillside near Hochwald, Solothurn, Switzerland. It somersaulted and broke up, killing 108 with 37 survivors. Many of the passengers were women from the Somerset, England villages of Axbridge, Cheddar, Wrington, Winscombe and Congresbury.
- 3 May 1975, During a flight from Luton Airport to Exeter Airport, the control column of Vanguard G-BAFK became detached from the instrument panel. The co-pilot made a safe landing.
- 5 April 1980, the starboard undercarriage of Britannia G-AOVF failed to retract on take-off from Ponta Delgada Airport, Portugal. A safe landing was made at Manston, where it was discovered that there was a 2 feet (610 mm) crack in the bogie beam.
