= Invicta International Airlines Flight 435 =

1973 crash near Hochwald, Switzerland

Invicta International Airlines Flight 435 Basel air crash
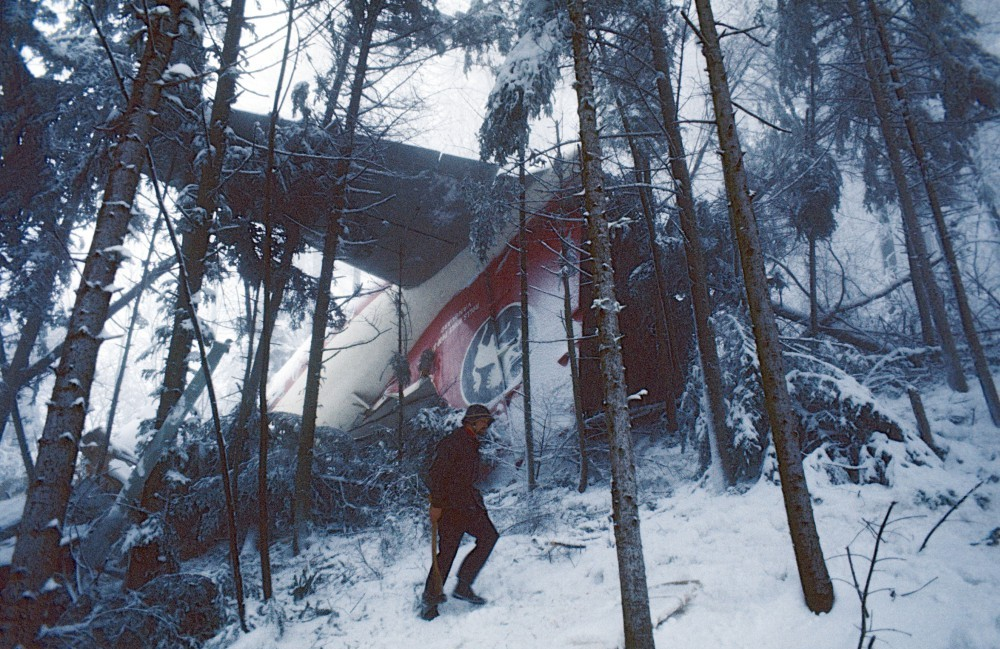
- Wreckage at the crash site

Accident
- Date: 10 April 1973
- Summary: Controlled flight into terrain
- Site: 300 m south of the Herrenmatt hamlet, Hochwald, Switzerland; 47°27′15″N 7°37′24″E

Aircraft
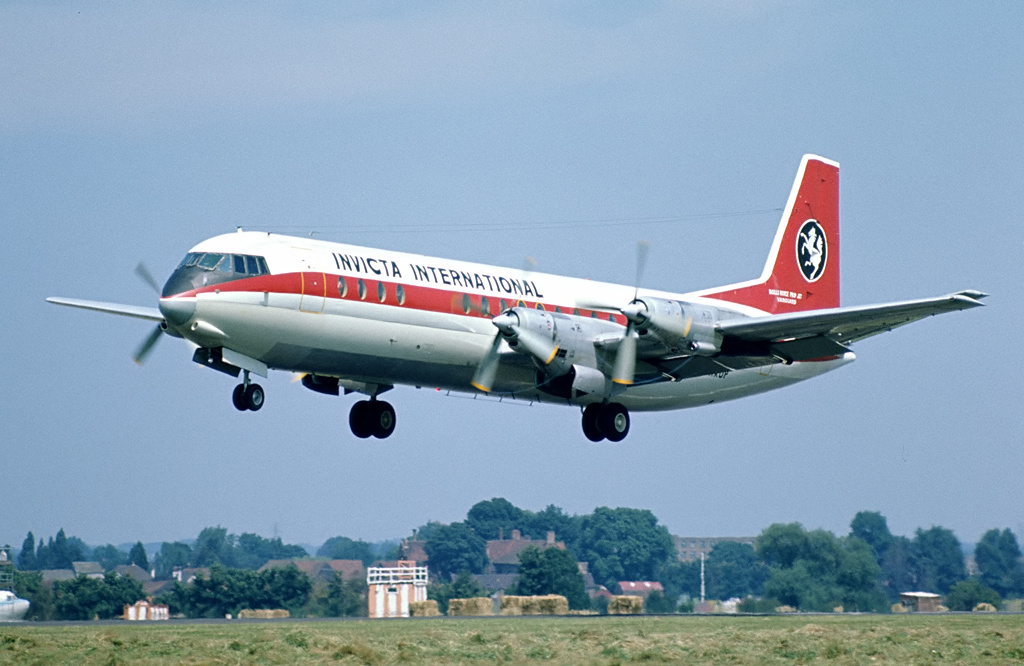
- G-AXOP, the aircraft involved in the accident, seen in 1971 at London Southend Airport
- Aircraft type: Vickers Vanguard
- Operator: Invicta International Airlines
- IATA flight No.: IM435
- Call sign: INVICTA 435
- Registration: G-AXOP
- Flight origin: Bristol Lulsgate Airport, England
- Destination: Basel-Mulhouse, France (airport is for Basel, Switzerland)
- Occupants: 145
- Passengers: 139
- Crew: 6
- Fatalities: 108
- Injuries: 36
- Survivors: 37

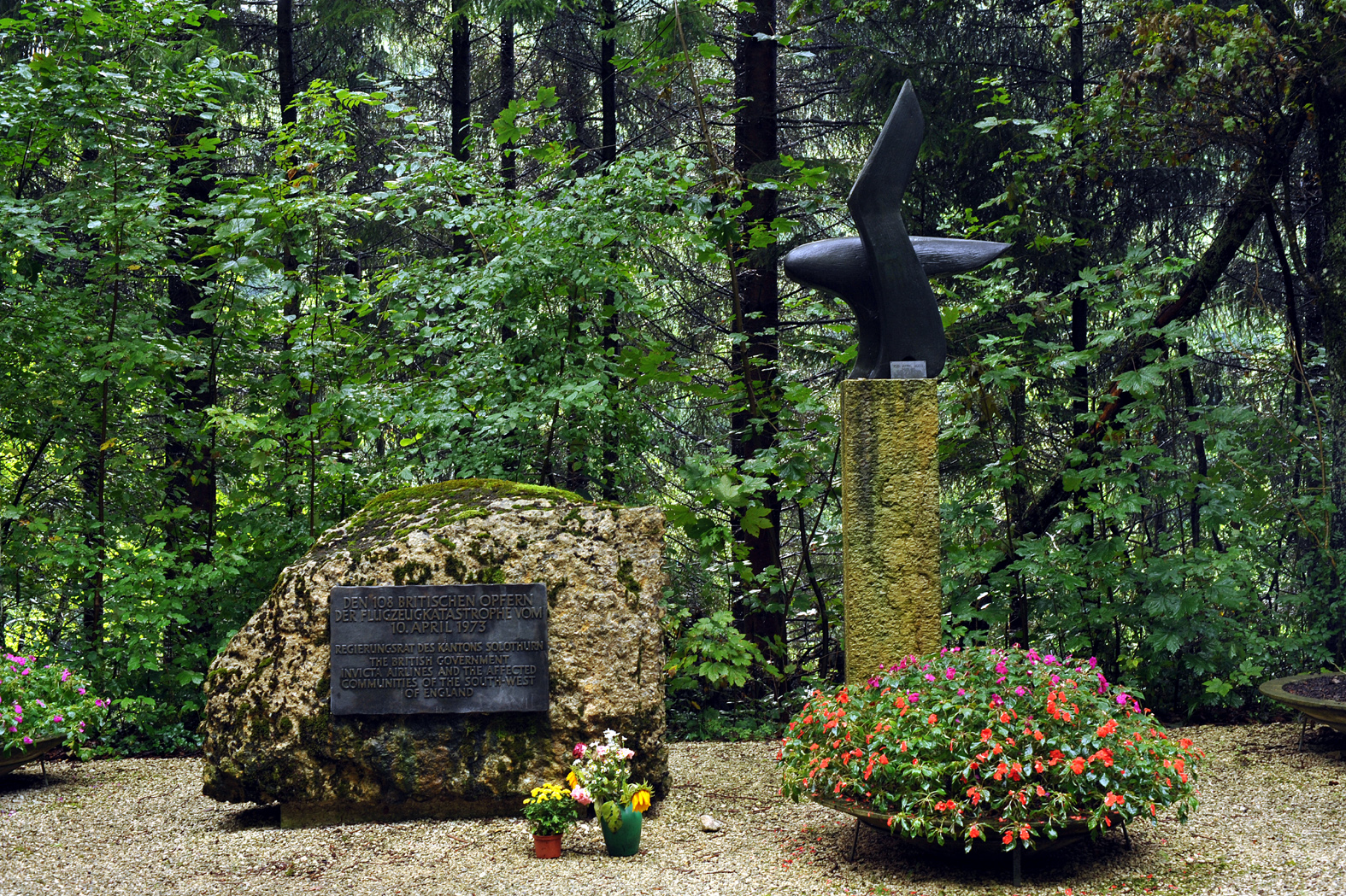
Memorial near Herrenmatt/Hochwald

Invicta International Airlines Flight 435 (IM435) was a Vickers Vanguard 952, flying from Bristol Lulsgate to Basel-Mulhouse, which crashed into a forested hillside near Hochwald, Switzerland on 10 April 1973. The aircraft somersaulted and broke up, killing 108 people, with 37 survivors. To date, this is the deadliest accident involving a Vickers Vanguard and the deadliest aviation accident to occur on Swiss soil. Many of the 139 passengers on the charter flight were women, members of the Axbridge Ladies Guild, from the Somerset towns and villages of Axbridge, Cheddar, Winscombe and Congresbury. The accident left 55 children motherless and became known in the British media as the Basle air crash (now more commonly reported as the Basel air crash).

Pilot Anthony Dorman became disorientated, misidentifying two radio beacons and missing another. When co-pilot Ivor Terry took over, his final approach was based on the wrong beacon and the aircraft crashed into the hillside. Dorman had previously been suspended from the Royal Canadian Air Force for lack of ability, and had failed his United Kingdom instrument flight rating test eight times. As a result of the crash, tougher regulations were introduced in the UK.

== Flight ==
The aircraft was a Vickers Vanguard 952, registered as G-AXOP, and was chartered by a tour company based in Britain. Flight 435 took off from Bristol (Lulsgate) Airport, Lulsgate Bottom, North Somerset, United Kingdom for EuroAirport Basel Mulhouse Freiburg International Airport in Saint-Louis, France. The airport is located just miles from the border of Switzerland and Germany. Early on the day of the crash flight, the aircraft departed from London's Luton International Airport and made a short positioning flight to Bristol where 139 passengers boarded.

At 07:19 UTC, Flight 435 took off from Bristol. Captain Anthony Dorman flew the plane, while his co-pilot Captain Ivor Terry was handling communication. The flight was uneventful until its first approach. It was daylight at the time, so visual references could be easily obtained by the crew. However, a heavy snowstorm was reported in Basel, thus reducing the visibility there.

While approaching Basel, Flight 435 passed two approach beacons, named as beacons MN and BN, the latter of which was the outer marker of the Instrument Landing System at the airport. However, the aircraft overshot. Captain Dorman then initiated a go-around.

At 09:08 UTC, while Flight 435 was maneuvering for its second approach, Basel Control Tower received a telephone call from a meteorologist and former aircraft commander reporting that barely two minutes previously, Flight 435 had flown above the Binningen Observatory (approximately eight kilometers southeast of the airport) at a height of around fifty meters while heading south; he urged the crews of Flight 435 to climb immediately. During the approach, several passengers briefly saw several houses on the ground. While the meteorologist was still on the phone, the crew reported that they had passed the first beacon, named as MN. They were instructed to pass the second beacon, BN. In reality, when the crew reported over MN, they were actually in the vicinity of a third beacon, BS, and had already overflown the airport, heading south.

At 09:11 UTC, Zurich Area Control Centre asked Basel Control whether they had an aircraft which was flying outbound from the airport towards Hochwald, as they had observed an unidentified echo on their radar screen, a few miles south of Basel. Basel Control Tower denied this, but when the controller checked his radar screen, he saw an unidentified echo moving to the south, a few miles from the airport. Notwithstanding this, Flight 435, having reported that it had passed beacon BN, was given a landing clearance.

After finishing his telephone call with Zurich, the Basel controller asked if Flight 435 was sure that they had passed beacon BN. Flight 435 replied that they had a "spurious indication" and that they were joining the localiser, an electronic signal marking the extended centerline of the runway. The crew then confirmed that they were established on the glide path and localiser, while the controller stated that he could not see them on his radar screen. The controller then informed the crew: "I think you are not on the...you are on the south of the airfield." Flight 435 did not respond. After this message, all calls to Flight 435 went unanswered.

At 09:13 UTC, the aircraft brushed the wooded area of a range of hills in Jura and crashed in the hamlet of Herrenmatt, in the parish of Hochwald, some ten miles (16 km) south of the airport and while flying away from it. The aircraft somersaulted and exploded, several parts of it catching fire. 108 passengers and crew were killed, while 37 others survived the crash; 36 of these were injured, while one air hostess was unhurt.

On hitting the ground, the aircraft snapped into several sections. While the front parts were "destroyed into bits", a section of the tail was left substantially intact. This was the area where most survivors were found. Everyone seated in the front part of the aircraft was killed.

In the aftermath of the crash, survivors began helping each other. It was snowing at the time, and hypothermia could easily occur. While pulling bodies from the wreckage, they began chanting hymns to keep their spirits high. Shortly afterwards, a boy from a nearby farm found the survivors, and led them to his house, where his family sheltered and took care of them while waiting for rescue services to arrive.

== Passengers and crew ==
Most of the passengers and crew were British citizens, among them a group of women from Axbridge in Somerset, United Kingdom.

The pilot who handled the aircraft was Captain Anthony Noel Dorman, a Canadian citizen, born in 1938, with a valid British pilot's license and type ratings for a Vickers Vanguard, Britten-Norman BN2 Islander, Douglas DC-3 and Douglas DC-4. Captain Dorman had begun his flight training with the Royal Canadian Air Force in 1963, but it was soon discontinued owing to his insufficient aptitude for flying. Following his discharge from the Air Force, he obtained a Canadian private pilot's license. He later obtained a commercial pilot's license and finally a senior commercial pilot's license, and then a Nigerian pilot's license.

Captain Dorman had tried at least nine times in the United Kingdom to obtain an instrument rating license for light aircraft and successfully obtained it in January 1971; he had failed the test several times owing to inadequate handling of the controls and lack of theoretical knowledge. He later obtained type ratings to fly the DC-3, DC-4, and Vickers Vanguard types of aircraft, although only after failing his flight test at least once on each occasion. Also in January 1971, he obtained a British airline pilot's license, and later joined Invicta International Airlines. In the first year he was employed by Invicta as a co-pilot on a Douglas DC-4, and later on a Vickers Vanguard. In October 1972, he was promoted to captain.

Captain Dorman was believed to have a total flying experience of 1,205 hours, with approximately 1,088 hours on the Vickers Vanguard, although discrepancies in the contents of his pilot's logbook made it impossible to tell how many hours he had flown. He had previous experience of Basel, having made 33 previous landings there, nine of which were instrument approach. He had flown seventeen times before with the co-pilot Captain Terry.

The co-pilot, Captain Ivor William Francis Terry, was born in 1926. He was a British citizen and held a British airline pilot's license. He had begun his flight training with the Royal Air Force in October 1944 and had been a military pilot since 1947, with experience flying Lancaster, Shackleton, Varsity and Valetta aircraft. Captain Terry was promoted to captain in October 1968 on a DC-4, and obtained a Vickers Vanguard type rating in 1971. He had a total flying experience of 9,172 hours, of which 3,144 were on the type. He had landed 61 times in Basel, with fourteen of them following instrument approaches.

== Investigation ==
The aircraft was equipped with a Flight Data Recorder. It lacked a Cockpit Voice Recorder, which was not required in all aircraft by United Kingdom aviation regulations at the time of the accident.

Meteorological agencies reported that snowstorms were present during Flight 435's approach, which would limit visibility. As Basel was located in a mountainous area, this limited visibility could be dangerous as the aircraft, like most airliners of its era, was not equipped with a Ground Proximity Warning System (GPWS).

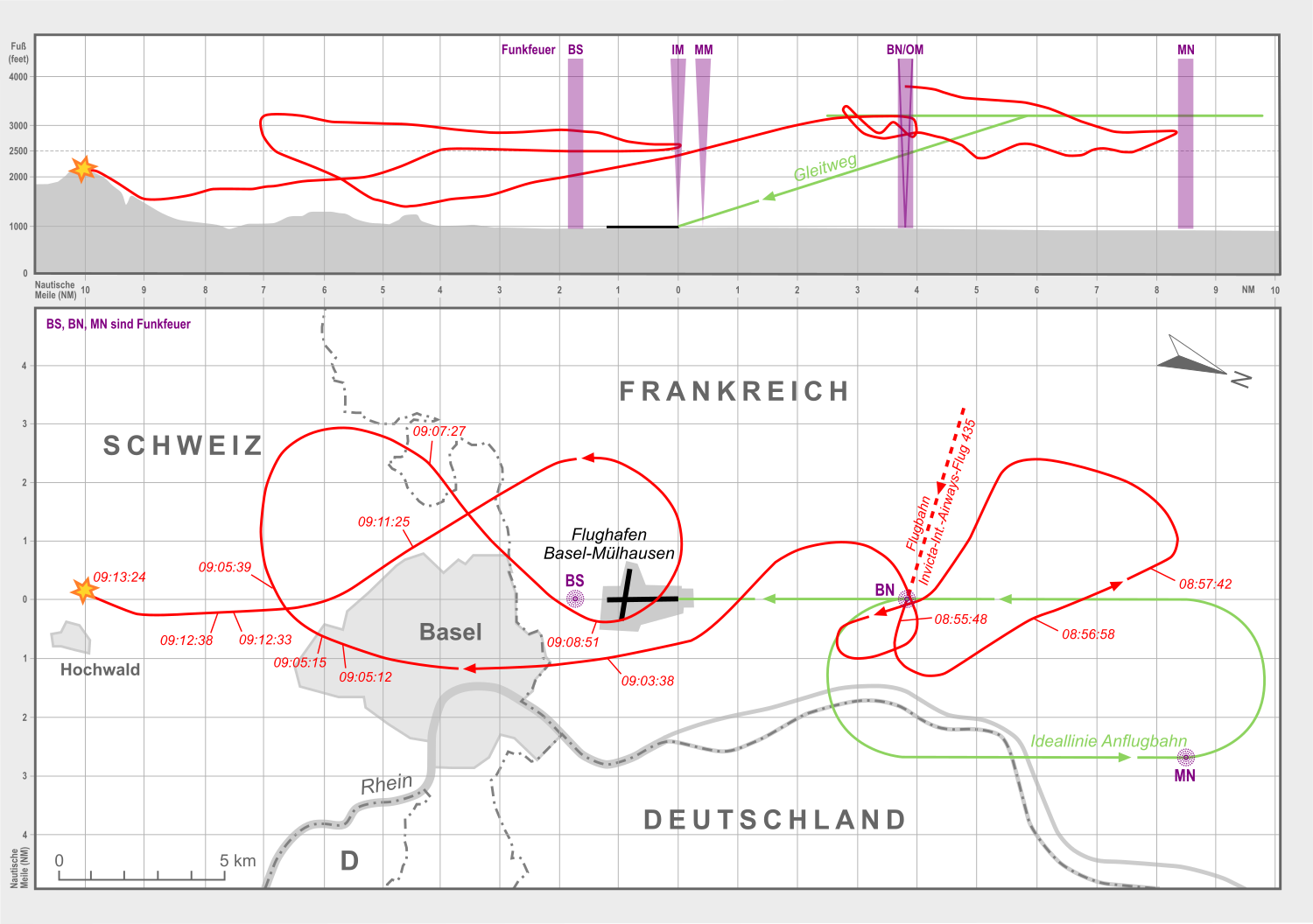
Flight path of Invicta Airlines Flight 435 according to the flight data recorder recording

Based on Air Traffic Control recordings, the Basel Air Controller stated that Flight 435 was not homing to the selected beacon during its last approach, while the crew of the flight stated that they were on the beacon. This could indicate a faulty signal or faulty navigational equipment. If the fault was in the navigation system, this could explain why the plane went astray from its selected path. However, Swiss accident investigators considered it was more likely that the flight crew made a navigational error and failed to detect it by neglecting to use other radio aids to navigation to monitor their progress.

Investigation on the Vanguard's ADF revealed that the ADF had poorly soldered joints in its loop servo amplifier in system No 1. These poorly soldered joints might have led to intermittent interruptions of the individual electrical connections in the amplifier. This fault was not noticed by the crew. The investigation could not determine the cause of the fault.

Both of the flight crew, Captain Dorman and Captain Terry, held a Captain rating. However, Captain Terry was far senior in experience to Captain Dorman. Captain Terry handled the first route segment, from Luton to Bristol, while Captain Dorman handled the Bristol to Basel route. The pilot in the right seat, Captain Terry, had insufficient co-pilot experience. Because he was a senior Captain, he acted and thought as such rather than as a co-pilot.

The inclement weather conditions, and the fact that the modulation of beacons MN and BN did not comply with ICAO requirements, caused every crew on every flight approaching Basel at the time to have some difficulties. The ADF indication was usable, but it was not reliable enough. Because it was not reliable, it was essential to monitor the aircraft's position by additional static-free navigational aids, or by radar from the ground. It was clear, accident investigators concluded, that the crew had failed to do so.

Despite the conclusions of the official Swiss report, one commentator, ex-KLM pilot Jan Bartelski, has argued that the pilots may not have been entirely to blame and that there is a possibility that they were led off course by "ghost" beacon transmissions caused by electric power lines.

== Legacy ==
On the 50th anniversary of the disaster, services of remembrance were held at churches in Congresbury, Wrington, Axbridge and Cheddar. In Congresbury, a memorial garden has been established.

== See also ==
- Alitalia Flight 404, a 1990 plane crash near Zurich in which the pilot lost orientation owing to faulty beacon receiver
- Pan Am Flight 812
- Intercontinental de Aviación Flight 256
