= Ramsgate Airport =

Defunct civil airport in Ramsgate, Kent, United Kingdom

Ramsgate Airport RAF Ramsgate
- IATA: none; ICAO: X2RT

Summary
- Airport type: Closed
- Serves: Ramsgate
- Elevation AMSL: 163 ft / 50 m
- Coordinates: 51°21′14.67″N 1°24′27.52″E

Map
- Location in Kent

Runways
Direction	Length		Surface
Direction	ft	m	Surface
	3,000	914	Grass

Ramsgate Airport was a civil airfield at Ramsgate, Kent, United Kingdom which opened in July 1935. It was briefly taken over by the Royal Air Force in the Second World War, becoming RAF Ramsgate. The airfield was then closed and obstructed to prevent its use. It reopened in 1953 and served until final closure in 1968. The site has now been redeveloped as an industrial estate.

== History ==
=== 1935–40 ===
Ramsgate was selected to be the site of a Landing Ground during the First World War, but no work was carried out. Built at a cost of £26,000, Ramsgate Airport opened on 1 July 1935, on a 90-acre (36 ha) site. With the opening of the airport, Hillman's Airways inaugurated a service to Belgium. As Ostend Airport was not then ready, services were initially to Le Zoute Airfield, Knokke. Four services per day were operated.

The airport was operated for the local council by Ramsgate Airport Ltd, which was registered as a private limited company on 20 July 1935 with capital of £5,000 in £1 shares. The directors were a Mr F Gwatkin, Richard Seaman and Whitney Straight. Ramsgate Airport Ltd was a subsidiary of Whitney Straight's Straight Corporation as the first of what would become a chain of 12 airports.

The official opening ceremony was performed by the Mayor of Ramsgate, who was then flown to Belgium in a de Havilland Dragon by Neville Stack. A representative from Crilly Airways also attended the dinner to celebrate the opening of the airport. Customs facilities were provided within a month of the airport opening. In October 1935, plans were made to extend the airport, with a control tower and a hangar amongst the facilities to be provided.

In February 1936, the site measured 850 by 860 yd (780 by 790 m). Fuel and customs facilities had been provided and a temporary hangar erected. By March 1936, the Thanet Aero Club had been formed as the Straight Corporation's replacement for Ramsgate Flying Club which had started in August 1934. The new club operated a de Havilland Hornet Moth. Mignet HM.14 "Flying Flea" aircraft had been grounded following a crash at Penshurst in May 1936, The ban had been lifted following wind tunnel tests which resulted in modifications to the wings. A race was held on 3 August in which seven aircraft took part, with a £100 prize at stake. An eighth aircraft was flown by Henri Mignet, who performed various aerobatics. The aircraft bore the inscription "Flying Flea flies in England. I thank the Air Ministry". Following the race, Short Scion aircraft flew pleasure flights. From 29 August – 26 September, an Aviation Camp was held at Ramsgate. It was sponsored by the National League of Airmen.

A tented holiday camp with its own clubhouse was set up on the airfield. For the 1936 and 1937 summer seasons it was called the Ramsgate Aviation Holiday Camp, and it was renamed the Ramsgate Flying Centre for the following two years. It offered guests free pleasure flights and a free flying lesson.

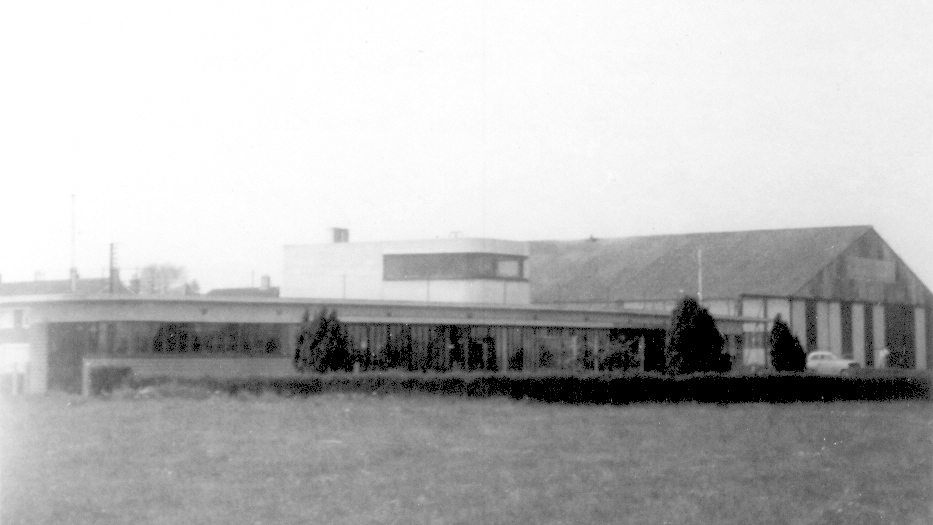
The clubhouse with the main hangar behind. Summer 1968.

On 3 July 1937, the official opening of Ramsgate Airport was performed by Director-General of Civil Aviation Sir Francis Shelmerdine. The airport terminal/clubhouse was designed by art deco architect David Playdell-Bouverie and incorporated the control tower at its centre. From 17 to 31 July, 611 (West Lancashire) (Bomber) Squadron, Royal Air Force held a camp at Ramsgate. In August, an air race was held at Ramsgate. The race was won by Paul Elwell in Taylor Cub G-AESK. Alex Henshaw was third in Percival Mew Gull G-AEXF and Geoffrey de Havilland was seventh in De Havilland T.K.2 G-ADNO. Sixteen aircraft participated in the race. Thirteen of them were British, with two German and one Latvian entry.

At Easter 1938, a week-long aviation camp was held at Ramsgate. This was followed by another held from 4 June – 17 September. In July, Southern Airways Ltd, another Straight Corporation company, started a twice-daily service between Ilford, Essex and Ramsgate.

In April 1939, the annual aviation camp was organised by the Civil Air Guard. An intensive two-week course enabled pilots to obtain their "A" licence at a cost of £10 3s. In previous years it would have cost £25 13s to obtain an A licence.

In 1940, Ramsgate was used as a satellite of RAF Manston during the Battle of Britain. In August, during one of the many raids on Manston, Ramsgate was also attacked and the field cratered. With the need for Ramsgate as a satellite airfield diminishing following the end of the battle, the airfield was closed and obstructions placed on it to prevent its use. Post-war, the site was used for agricultural purposes.

=== 1952–68 ===
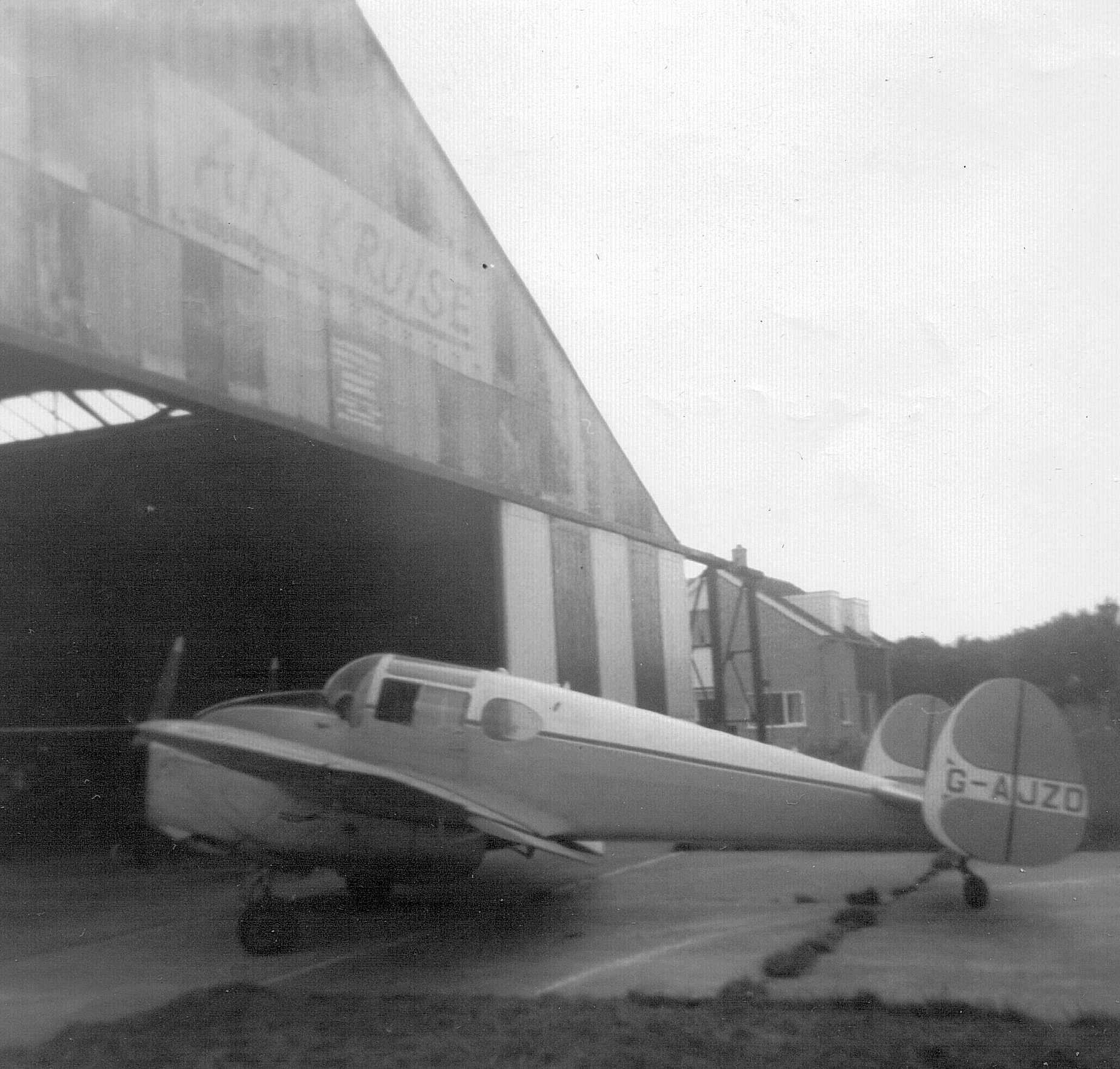
The main hangar with the Air Kruise logo. The aircraft was owned by the president of Thanet Flying Club.

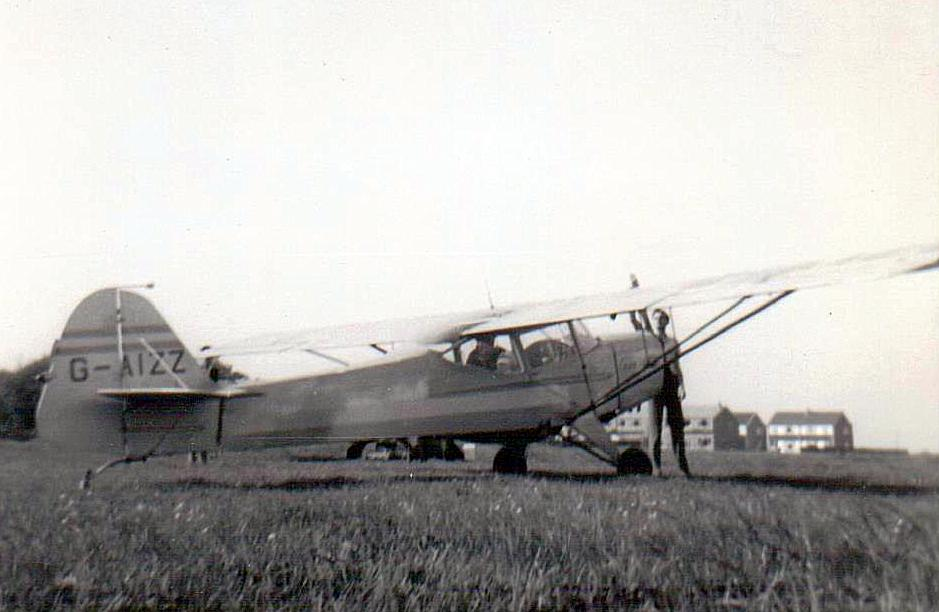
Auster 5-J1 G-AIZZ at Ramsgate Airport in 1966

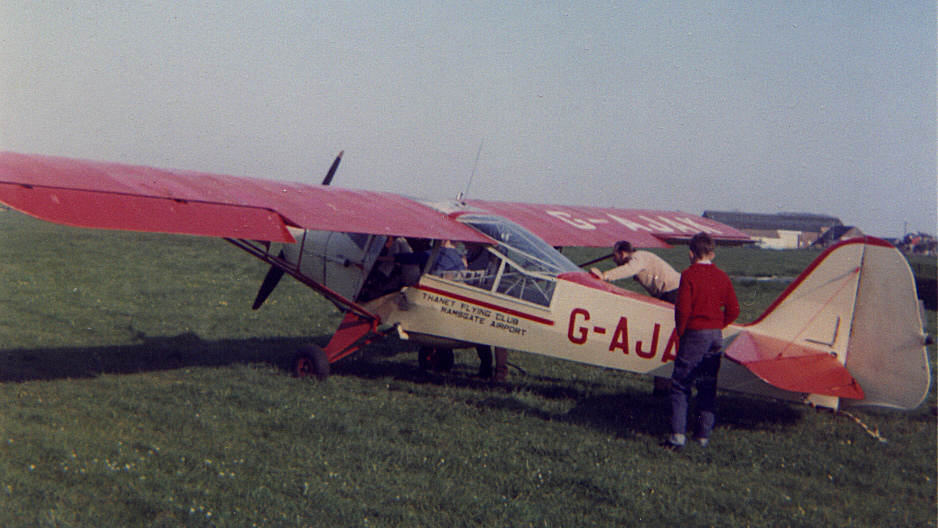
Thanet Flying Club Auster 5 G-AJAK.

On 1 June 1952, Ramsgate Airport reopened and became known as Ramsgate Municipal Airport. Air Kruise (Kent) Ltd had taken a 21-year lease on the land. They extended their Le Touquet – Lympne service to Ramsgate. The war-damaged buildings and hangars were repaired, and the main hangar was extended by doubling its length. Fire and rescue were provided by a red painted ex army Willys Jeep equipped with a huge foam generating extinguisher, asbestos suits and various axes and tools. A 1,000 yards (910 m) grass runway running 04/22 was available marked out with parallel concrete slabs set into the grass which were sometimes painted white, suitable to operate Avro Anson, de Havilland Dragon Rapide and de Havilland Heron aircraft. The first aircraft to land at Ramsgate was Auster J/1 Autocrat G-AIZZ. owned by Hugh Kennard. Early services from Ramsgate were operated by Dragon Rapides.

Ramsgate Airport was officially reopened on 27 June 1953 by Minister for Civil Aviation Alan Lennox-Boyd. The prototype Heron was amongst the aircraft that gave displays at the opening ceremony. A new flying club was formed, the Ramsgate Flying Club, staffed by instructor Ron Pullinger, a friend of Kennard Air Kruise moved its operations from Lympne to Ramsgate later that year. Air Kruise traded as Trans-Channel Airways. It carried 22,500 passengers in 1953.

On 1 May 1954, Air Kruise was taken over by Britavia, which also owned Aquila Airways and Silver City Airways, but kept its separate identity. Between 1954 and 1957, summer seasons, pleasure flights were provided in various De Havilland Dragon Rapides including G-AGUF and subsequently G-AKIF (still carrying the logo of Manx Airlines) and often piloted by Ron Pullinger. Ron's wife worked in the airport office. Ron later flew for another of Hugh Kennard's companies Air Ferry and died 1967 in a DC4, G-APYK crash at Perpignan after carbon monoxide leaked into the flight deck. The Rapide carried 8 passengers as well as the pilot. Punters were rounded up from kiosks at Ramsgate Harbour and Margate seafront near Dreamland and conveyed to the airport in a Morris J-type minibus and a Dormobile. The airport provided teas and snacks for waiting passengers. The average flight lasted 8 minutes flying along the coast via Ramsgate, Broadstairs and Margate, reversed dependant on wind direction. The fare was 7/6d (37½p). Rollasons stationed an engineer, Jim Bowyer, at the airport to service and maintain the Rapides. Off season, Jim assembled and refurbished Ex RAF Tiger Moths of which Rollasons had purchased a considerable number for conversion to civilian use. The wing rib jigs for the first Rollason built Druine Turbulent were constructed at Ramsgate for Norman Jones.

In 1958, Air Kruise was absorbed into Silver City. Hugh Kennard, joint managing director of Silver City, formed Aircraft Engineering and Maintenance Ltd (AEM) at Ramsgate.The company overhauled aircraft engine gearboxes, hydraulic systems and instruments.

In March of 1959, Jock Maitland, recently retired from RAF and later to become Commandant of Biggin Hill, began offering pleasure flights in his Percival Proctor G-AKYB while his wife rounded up passengers from Ramsgate harbour. As the summer season approached he registered as Maitland Air Charter and bought 2 Percival Prentice aircraft from Freddy Laker's Aviation Traders at Southend, G-APIY and G-AOKF. £1250 each in colour of your choice with 12 channel radio. The kiosks were revived and the minibuses brought back into use with additional pilots including John Page. Later that summer he bought another Prentice G-APJE which was a 7 seater. The aircraft were rotated to Southend for service and maintenance.

In 1962 Cormorant Aviation began offering pleasure flights in a Piper PA22 Tri-Pacer G-ARCB often piloted by Paul Horsting who later became Cathay Pacific's international operations manager, piloting the record-breaking inaugural trans polar flight non stop from New York to Hong Kong in 1998.

As of 2011, AEM is known as Aviation Engineering & Maintenance Ltd and is a part of Rio Tinto Zinc. By 1960, AEM assembled the first Champion Tri-Traveller aircraft in the UK, G-APYT, at Ramsgate. Further Tri-Travellers were also assembled at Ramsgate.

In 1963, Chrisair were operating de Havilland Dragon G-ADDI from Ramsgate for pleasure flights. In March 1965, Kennard formed Invicta International Airlines, based at Manston Airport, but with a head office based at Ramsgate.

Aircraft stored at Ramsgate included Hugh Kennard's personal Miles Messenger G-AHZS and Wing Commander Presland's Auster Autocrat G-AGXV "Pamela".

Ramsgate Airport closed in 1968.

== Current use ==
The area has turned to housing and an industrial estate, and nothing remains of the airfield except the hangar along Hopes lane. Originally steel framed, the building was clad with asbestos sheeting and Henderson sliding wooden doors at the front. The building is now used as commercial premises. Until the early 1980s the delineation between the pre war hangar and the post war addition could be seen by comparing the weathered rear roof cladding and the newer, paler front panels. Several new roads in the area have been given aircraft names to commemorate the airport's existence, including Anson Close, Blenheim Close, Hornet Close, Lysander Close and Vincent Close.

== Accidents and incidents ==
- On 5 August 1935, an aircraft operating a pleasure flight from Ramsgate suffered a broken oil pipe. A forced landing was made at Northwood, Thanet. The aircraft tipped on its nose when it ran through a fence but the five passengers were uninjured. The aircraft sustained minor damage.
- on 24 August 1937, BAC Drone de Luxe G-AEEN stalled and crashed on approach to the airport, killing the sole occupant, David Holliday Jorge.
- On 17 July 1938, a light aircraft belonging to Thanet Aero Club crashed into the sea off Cliftonville, killing both occupants. The pilot had been performing aerobatics over HMS Revenge when it entered a spin.
- On 29 June 1957, de Havilland Dragon Rapide G-AGUF of Island Air Services, based at Ramsgate, crashed on take-off, when a tyre burst, whilst operating a local pleasure flight. The aircraft was written off, but all on board escaped uninjured.
- On 16 February 1967, Auster 5 G-AJAK of Thanet Flying Club failed to clear trees to the east of the runway, and was wrecked. There were no injuries.
- On 6 April 1969 Miles Gemini 1A G-AJZO, on a pleasure flight from Ramsgate, suffered an engine failure and made an emergency landing on the beach at Minnis Bay, about 5 miles (8.0 km) away. The aircraft was written off when the undercarriage collapsed on hitting rocks. There were no injuries. The owner and pilot was Mr Ted Brace, president of Thanet Flying Club.

== Sources ==
- Collyer, David G (1992). Lympne Airport in old photographs. Stroud: Alan Sutton Publishing Ltd. ISBN 0-7509-0169-1.
- Delve, Ken (2005). The Military Airfields of Britain. Southern England: Kent, Hampshire, Surrey and Sussex. Ramsbury: The Crowood Press Ltd. ISBN 1-86126-729-0.
- Finnis, Malcolm (2007). Twilight of the Pistons. Air Ferry, a Manston Airline. Ramgate: Michael's Bookshop. ISBN 978-1-905477-93-7.
- Humphreys, Roy (2001). Kent Aviation, A Century of Flight. Stroud: Sutton Publishing. ISBN 0-7509-2790-9.
- Moor, Anthony John (2019). Ramsgate Airport a pictorial history. UK: Fonthill Media. ISBN 978-1-78155-694-8.
