= Hugh Kennard =

RAF pilot and civil aviation entrepreneur (1918–1995)

Hugh Charles Kennard
- Born: 24 June 1918
- Died: 2 June 1995 (aged 76)
- Military career
- Allegiance: United Kingdom
- Branch: Royal Air Force
- Service years: 1937–1949
- Rank: Wing Commander
- Unit: No. 66 Squadron RAF
- Conflicts: World War II: Battle of Britain
- Awards: Distinguished Flying Cross
- Other work: Civilian aviator

Wing Commander Hugh Charles Kennard, DFC (24 June 1918 – 2 June 1995) was a Royal Air Force pilot during World War II and later an entrepreneur in civil aviation.

== Personal life ==
Kennard was born on 24 June 1918 at Coxheath, Kent, United Kingdom, the son of Charles W Kennard and his wife. He was educated at Cranbrook School in Kent. Kennard's first wife was Jean Muriel Crossley. His second wife was Audrey, whom he married in November 1940. Kennard subsequently married Jane Neville in 1969. Hugh Kennard died in 1995. Kennard had one son, Jeremy, by his first wife, and a further son, Julian, by his third wife.

== Career ==
=== RAF career ===
Kennard joined the Royal Air Force on a short-service commission in January 1938 as an acting pilot officer. His commission was confirmed in October 1938. During 1938, he bought the prototype Jaguar SS 90 roadster, registered ARW395. He served with No. 66 Squadron RAF and 610 Squadron between until 1940. In early 1940, he flew missions over Dunkirk during the evacuation and, in mid-1940, was engaged in combat missions over southern England. In July 1940, Kennard was promoted to flying officer and assigned to No. 306 Polish Fighter Squadron as a flight commander in the Hawker Hurricane squadron formed by the Polish government at RAF Church Fenton in Yorkshire. The squadron became active towards the end of the Battle of Britain. Kennard sold the SS 90 some time after his marriage in November 1940.

In 1941, Kennard was promoted to flight lieutenant and assisted in the formation of No. 121 Squadron RAF, a Hurricane squadron composed of American volunteer pilots, based at RAF Kirton in Lindsey in Lincolnshire. The squadron became operational in two months. After converting from Hurricanes to Supermarine Spitfires, Kennard led the American squadron on missions across the English Channel. The station commander at the time purchased a five-gallon tin of peanut butter from Harrods in order to make the American personnel feel more at home.

After the attack on Pearl Harbor and the declaration of war by the United States, Kennard is reputed to have proposed a toast with the words "You're all in it now, Yanks!" He was made squadron commander in early 1942 and was shot down and wounded in July while participating in a bomber-escort mission. Having flown 58 missions since taking command, he was awarded the Distinguished Flying Cross for a combat operation in May 1942 in which he engaged eight enemy aircraft, shooting down two, with a third claimed as probable and a fourth damaged.

Later that month Kennard led his flight in a successful attack on a minesweeper and later still attacked and sank an armed trawler off the Dutch coast. Kennard relinquished command of the squadron in September 1942. In October 1942, Kennard was wounded in action. He was promoted to acting squadron leader in 1943.

=== Later career ===
After relinquishing command of 121 Squadron, Kennard was assigned to the Directorate of Fighter Operations in the Air Ministry and then to a role overseeing troop movements. He returned to operations in May 1945, having been confirmed as a squadron leader, and took command of a Spitfire squadron – No. 74 Squadron RAF. He commanded a station until he left the RAF in 1946 and then served with the Royal Auxiliary Air Force from 1949 to 1952, commanding No. 500 Squadron RAF and flying Gloster Meteors. He was granted the rank of wing commander in April 1949. He took Anthony Eden, the squadron's honorary air commodore, for a ride in a Meteor.

In 1949, Kennard was to have taken part in a Royal Auxiliary Air Force Race based at RAF Elmdon. He was due to fly a Meteor 3, but the aircraft was unable to participate in the race because of the weather at its base, RAF West Malling. He retired from active service and was appointed to the reserve in 1952 and relinquished his commission in 1959.

=== Civilian aviation ===
After he left the Royal Air Force, Kennard became an entrepreneur in civilian aviation. He founded or became director of, several airlines and aviation-related companies, including Air Kruise, which ran Ramsgate Airport, and Silver City Airways. In 1946, Kennard formed Air Kruise at Lympne Airport. In August of that year, Kennard took delivery of the first civilian Miles Messenger, G-AHZS, from Miles Aircraft Ltd. The handover was made at Heston Aerodrome. Air Kruise operated Airspeed Consuls, Auster Autocrats, Miles Messengers, Miles Geminis and Percival Proctors. They also operated de Havilland Dragon Rapides.

Kennard and his wife came second in the 1946 Folkestone Trophy Air Race, the first to be held at Lympne after the war. In 1948 Kennard formed Skyfotos, which specialised in the commercial aerial photography of shipping passing through the English Channel and was based at Lympne and Ramsgate. In October the same year, Kennard formed the Kent Coast Flying Club, which was based at Lympne and replaced the Cinque Ports Flying Club, which had folded on 1 October. Amongst the aircraft operated was Miles Magister G-AKJX. In 1953, Air Kruise moved from Lydd to Ramsgate.

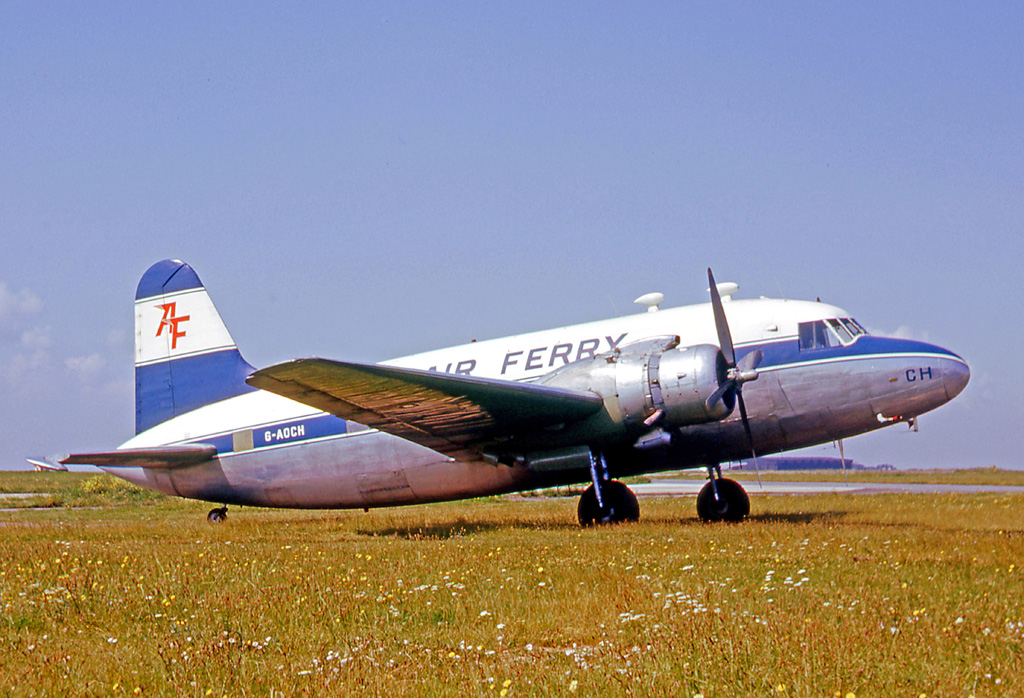
Air Ferry Vickers Viking G-AOCH, at Manston, 1965

In 1958, Kennard formed Aircraft Engineering and Maintenance Ltd at Ramsgate. The company overhauled aircraft engine gearboxes, hydraulic systems and instruments. As of 2011, AEM is known as Aviation Engineering & Maintenance Ltd and is a part of Rio Tinto Zinc.

Kennard was joint managing director of Silver City Airways until his resignation in November 1960. In May 1961, Kennard formed a new airline, which was to be based at Rochester Airport. This airline was Air Ferry. For operational reasons, Manston Airport was chosen as the base. Air Ferry commenced operations on 30 March 1963.

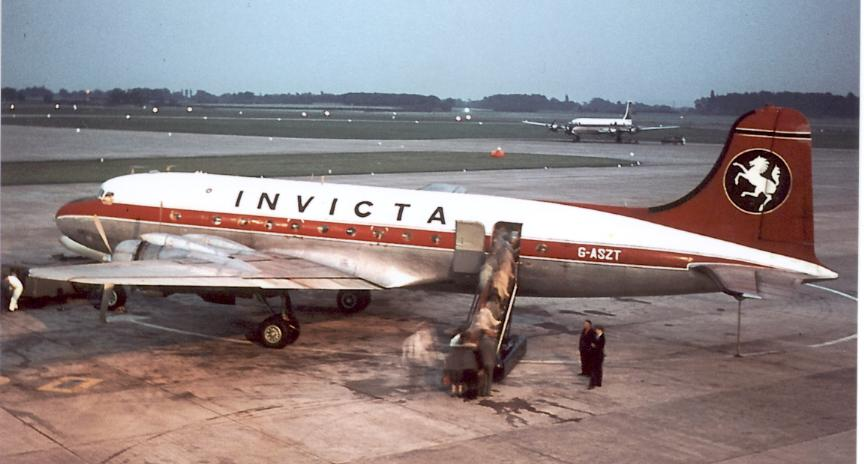
Invicta Airways Ltd, DC-4 G-ASZT at Manchester Airport 1966

In November 1964, Kennard formed Invicta Airways Limited at Manston, following a takeover of Air Ferry by Air Holdings Ltd. Although based at Manston, the head office was at Ramsgate. On 3 January 1969, Invicta was merged with British Midland, creating "British Midland – Invicta Cargo".

The merger was forced by London merchant bank Minster Trust. In July, the air cargo operation was sold back to Kennard, who formed a new company, Invicta Airways (1969) Ltd. In February 1973, European Ferries Group acquired a 76% holding of Invicta, by now trading as Invicta International Airlines. On 30 September 1975, Invicta ceased operations as a result of European Ferries decision to cease airline operations.

In February 1976, the assets of Invicta were bought by Universal Air Transport Sales, which Kennard had set up. Invicta was sold in 1980, Kennard left the company and established a business at Canterbury restoring classic cars.

== Sources ==
- Collyer, David G (1992). Lympne Airport in old photographs. Stroud: Alan Sutton Publishing Ltd. ISBN 0-7509-0169-1.
- Finnis, Malcolm (2006). Take-off to Touchdown, the Invicta Airlines story. Langney: Malcolm Finnis. ISBN 9780951729526.
