= Air Ferry Limited =

Independent British airline 1963–1968

Air Ferry Ltd.
- Founded: 1962
- Ceased operations: 1968
- Hubs: Manston Airport
- Fleet size: 6 aircraft (2 turboprop and 4 piston airliners) (2 Vickers Viscount 812s, 2 Douglas DC-6As, 2 Douglas DC-4s [as of April 1968])
- Destinations: British Isles, Continental Europe
- Parent company: Leroy Tours (May 1961-October 1964); Air Holdings (October 1964- October 1968)
- Headquarters: Manston Airport
- Key people: Capt. K.J. Sheppardson, P.R. Lockwood, Capt. D. Brooker, C.E. Carroll, R.F. Sanders, R.H. Illsley, M. Austin, L.R. Rickards, P. Dalton

Air Ferry Limited was a private, independent British airline operating charter, scheduled and all-cargo flights from 1963 to 1968.

== History ==
Wing Commander Hugh Kennard, the Air Kruise founder and a former Silver City Airways director, and Leroy Tours founder Lewis Leroy formed Air Ferry Ltd in July 1962 as a subsidiary of Leroy Tours to operate general charter and inclusive tour (IT) flights.

Air Ferry started operations on 1 April 1963, providing IT charters from Manston Airport near Ramsgate, Kent, in south east England. It initially operated two 40-seat Vickers Viking and two 80-seat Douglas DC-4/C-54s piston airliners. Before the start of operations, the Air Transport Licensing Board (ATLB) had awarded Air Ferry three A-type licences to operate scheduled services from Manston to Le Touquet, Ostend and Verona. Services to Le Touquet and Ostend were due to begin in mid-April 1963 and to Verona on 1 April 1964. (Scheduled vehicle ferry and all-cargo services did eventually start in 1965. These operated between Manston and Le Touquet, Calais, Ostend as well as Rotterdam.)

Air Ferry added a third DC-4, more Vikings, a Bristol Freighter, and a pair of Douglas DC-6As to its fleet over the coming years. The latter were the airline's first pressurised aircraft.

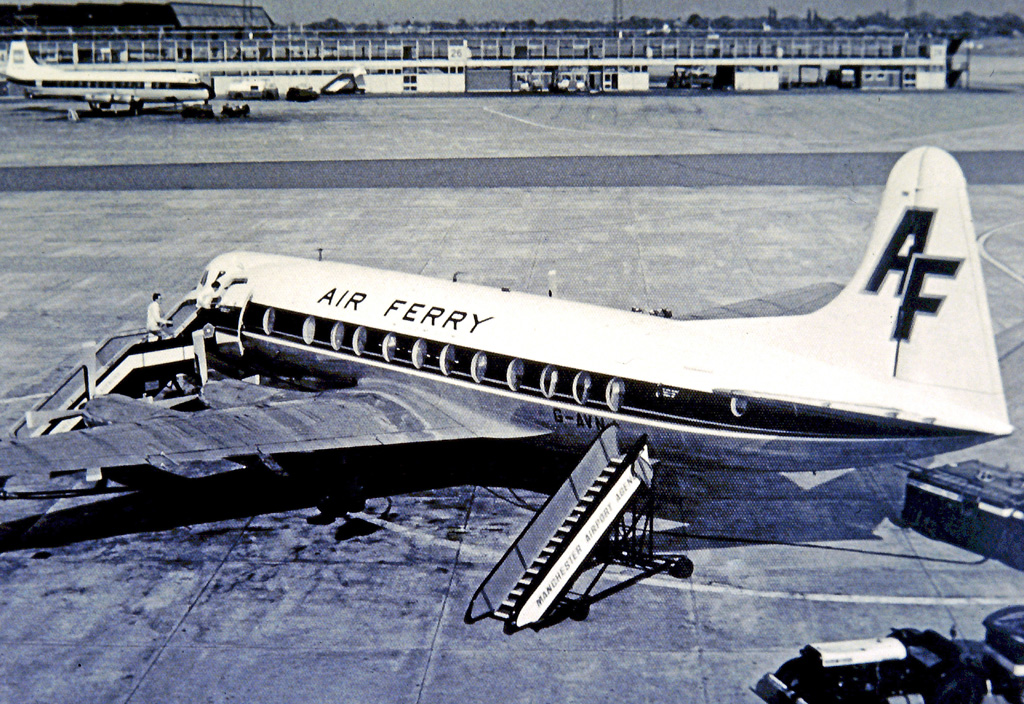
Vickers Viscount 812 of Air Ferry at Manchester Airport in July 1968

In October 1964 Air Ferry's ownership passed to Air Holdings as a consequence of the latter's acquisition of Leroy Tours. At the time, Air Holdings was the parent company of British United Airways (BUA), Britain's largest contemporary independent airline and leading private sector scheduled carrier. This made Air Ferry an associate of BUA. Air Holdings' takeover of Air Ferry restored the cross-Channel vehicle ferry services monopoly of British United Air Ferries, a sister airline of BUA.

In 1968 Air Ferry leased a pair of Vickers Viscount 800s. By that time, it operated scheduled and non-scheduled services carrying passengers and their cars as well as cargo from Manchester, Bristol and London in addition to Manston. Summer 1968 was Air Ferry's last season of operations, and the airline ceased trading on 31 October 1968.Assets were integrated into the BUA Group.

== Fleet ==
Air Ferry fleet consisted the following aircraft types:

- 2 x Aviation Traders ATL-98 Carvair leased 1965-1966
- 2 x Bristol 170 Freighter leased 1964-1965
- 4 x Douglas DC-4/Douglas C-54 Skymaster 1963-1968
- 2 x Douglas DC-6 1965-1968
- 5 x Vickers Viking 1963-1966
- 2 x Vickers Viscount leased in 1968

=== Fleet in 1965 ===
In April 1965 the fleet comprised 9 aircraft.

| Aircraft | Total |
|---|---|
| Douglas DC-4 | 3 |
| Vickers Viking | 5 |
| Bristol 170 Freighter | 1 |
| Total | 9 |

=== Fleet in 1968 ===
In April 1968 the fleet comprised 6 aircraft.

| Aircraft | Total |
|---|---|
| Vickers Viscount 812 | 2 |
| Douglas DC-6A | 2 |
| Douglas DC-4 | 2 |
| Total | 6 |

== Gallery ==
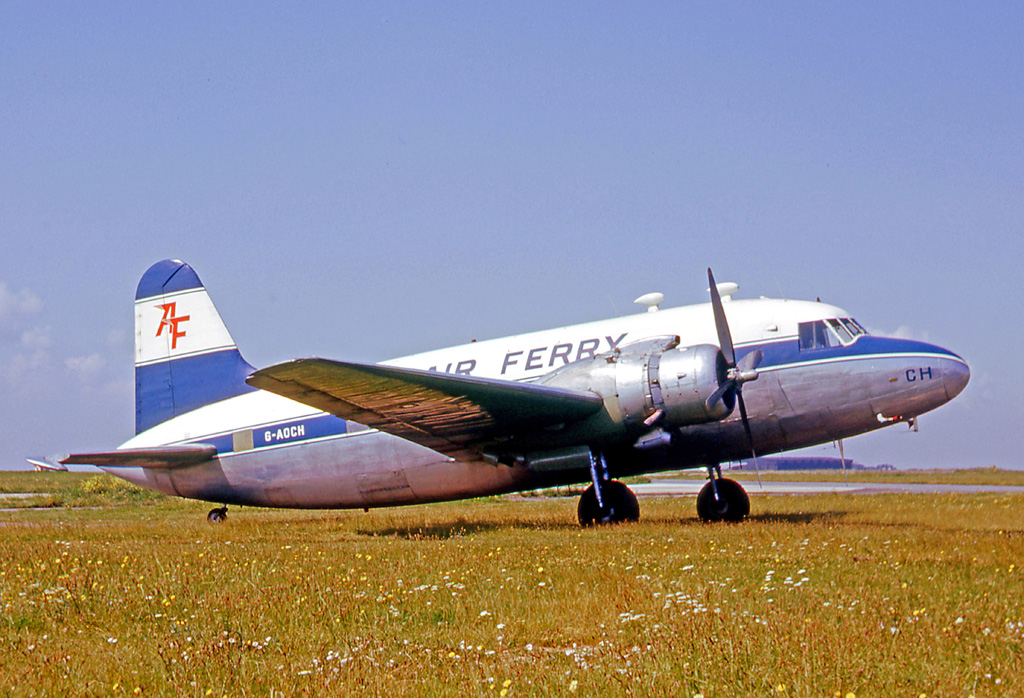
Vickers Viking

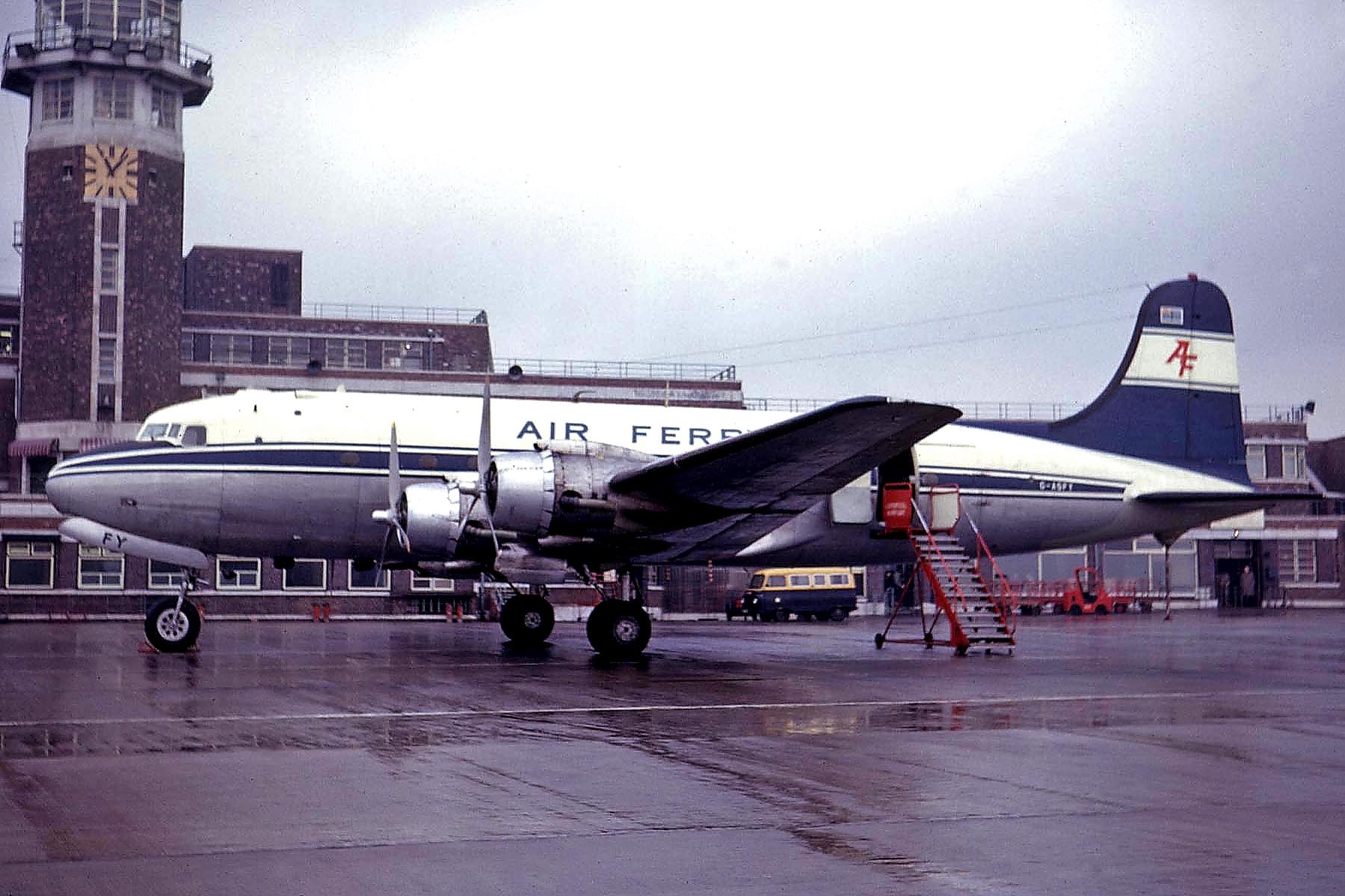
Douglas DC-4

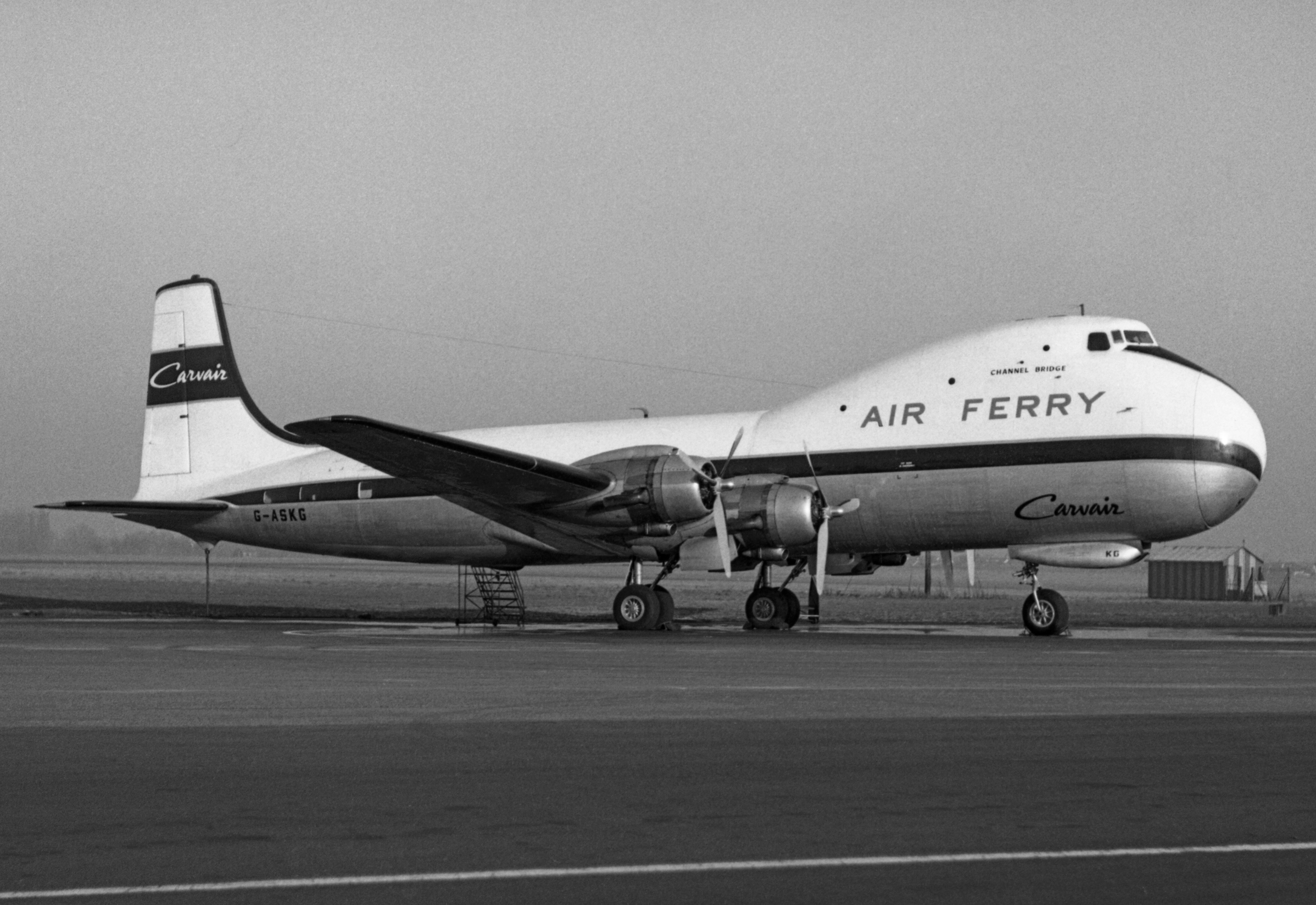
Aviation Traders ATL-98 Carvair

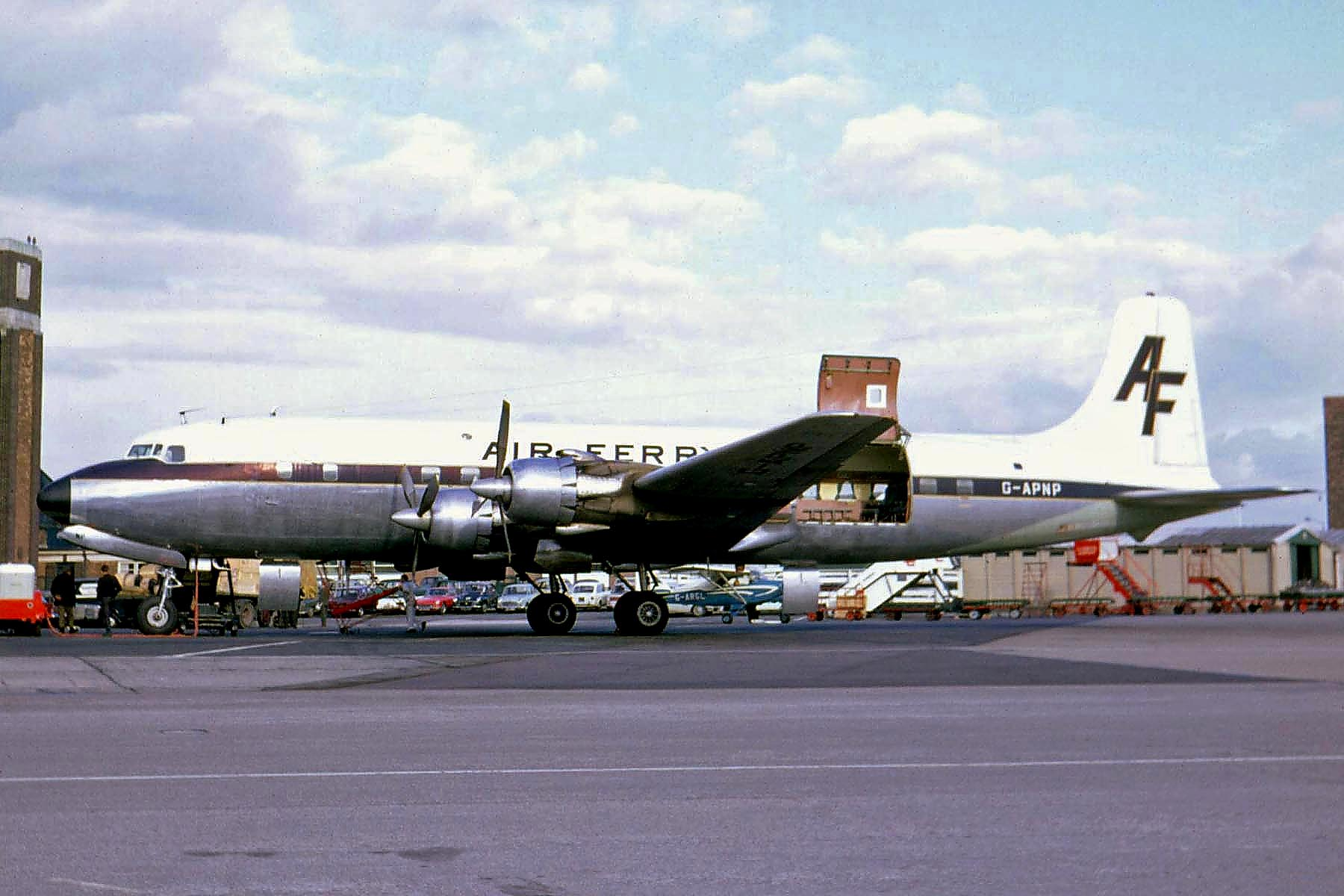
Douglas DC-6A

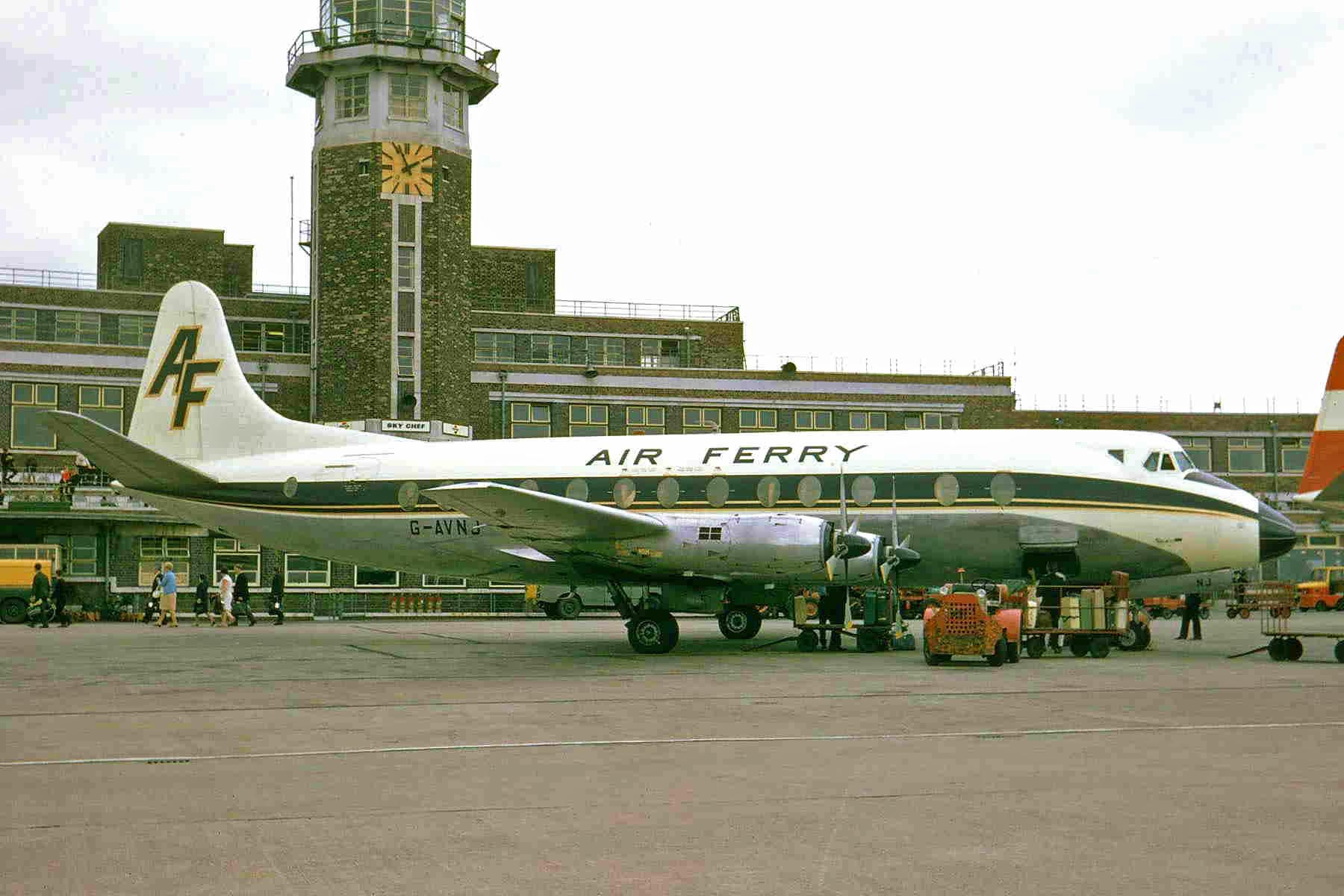
Vickers Viscount 812

== Incidents and accidents ==
1. 21 January 1967: a Douglas C-54 Skymaster registered G-ASOG operating a cargo flight from Manchester to Frankfurt in Germany struck trees while executing a night-time approach, resulting in the death of both crew members.
2. 3 June 1967: a Douglas C-54A Skymaster registered G-APYK operating a charter passenger flight from Manston to Perpignan in France struck the Canigou mountain at 4,000 feet while in the descent, killing all 88 occupants (five crew and 83 passengers). Cause of the accident was determined to be carbon monoxide poisoning of the flight crew due to a faulty cabin heater.1967 Air Ferry DC-4 accident

== See also ==
- List of defunct airlines of the United Kingdom
