= 1967 Air Ferry DC-4 accident =

1967 aviation disaster

Coordinates: 42°31′42.2″N 2°23′57.0″E

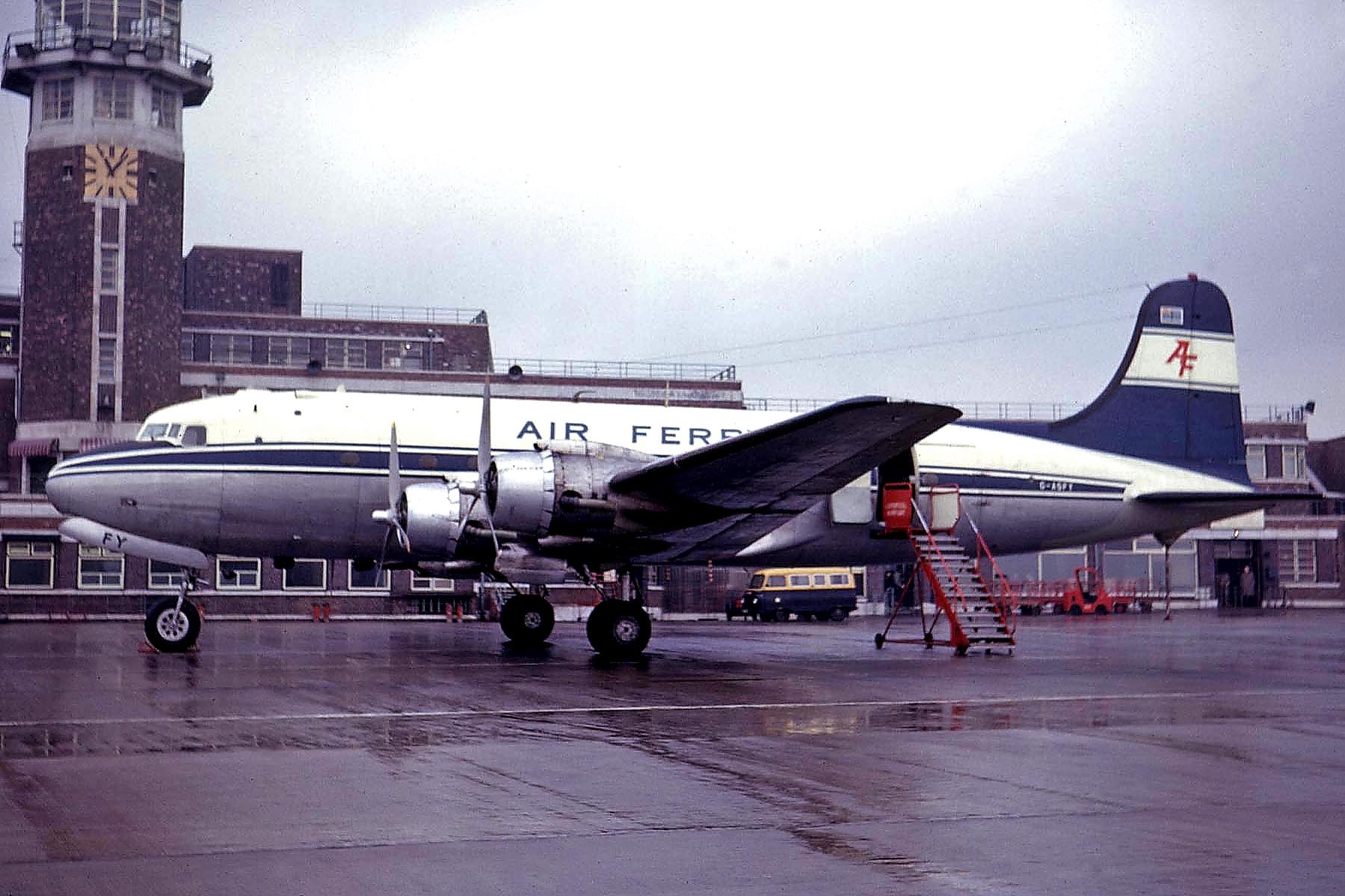
- A DC-4 similar to the accident aircraft

Accident
- Date: 3 June 1967
- Summary: Carbon monoxide poisoning of the flight crew due to a faulty cabin heater.
- Site: Canigó mountain, France

Aircraft
- Aircraft type: Douglas DC-4
- Operator: Air Ferry
- Registration: G-APYK
- Flight origin: Manston Airport, United Kingdom
- Destination: Perpignan Airport, France
- Occupants: 88
- Passengers: 83
- Crew: 5
- Fatalities: 88
- Survivors: 0

The 1967 Air Ferry DC-4 accident occurred on 3 June 1967, when a Douglas DC-4 registered as G-APYK on a non-scheduled charter flight between Manston Airport in Kent, England and Perpignan Airport in France hit the Canigó mountain in France, killing all 88 on board. The cause of the accident was determined to be carbon monoxide poisoning of the flight crew due to a faulty cabin heater. The crash is the deadliest aviation accident involving a DC-4.

== Accident ==
The flight was the first leg of a 15-day package holiday to the Costa Brava, organised by Lyons Tours. Aboard the plane were 83 passengers and 5 crew.

At 10:04, the aircraft reported to air traffic control at Perpignan that all was well, visibility was good, and that they were beginning to descend. A few minutes later, the aircraft hit 9,000-foot Mount Canigó to the south-west of Perpignan. The aircraft was destroyed, and all 88 on board were killed.

== Aircraft ==
The Douglas DC-4 aircraft had been built as a C-54A Skymaster for the United States Army Air Forces in 1942. It had been imported by the United Kingdom in 1960 by Starways, and Air Ferry had purchased the aircraft in 1963. The airframe had flown 42,300 hours at the time of its last maintenance check.

== Investigation ==
An investigation by the French Ministry of Transport into the accident concluded that the crash was a result of a series of errors by the crew, but that their irrational behavior was caused by carbon monoxide poisoning from a faulty heater. Investigators also mentioned language difficulties between the crew and the Perpignan controller, and that radio directional finding equipment not being used to determine the aircraft's location may have aggravated the circumstances.
