= Air Kruise =

Airline of the United Kingdom (1946–1958)

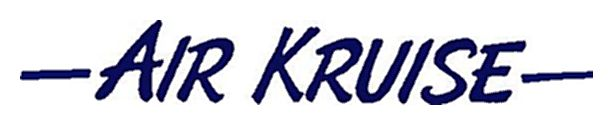
- Founded: 1946
- Commenced operations: August 1946
- Ceased operations: Spring 1958
- Operating bases: Lympne Airport, Ramsgate Airport, Lydd Airport
- Fleet size: Max 14
- Key people: Hugh Kennard

Air Kruise was a British airline established in Kent in 1946. Starting with light aircraft for charter work, it expanded to include scheduled services to the near-continent. It was absorbed into Silver City Airways in 1957.

== History ==
Squadron Leader Hugh Kennard DFC left the RAF in 1946, and became a director of Silver City Airways, as well as setting up his own company, officially named Air Kruise (Kent) Ltd.

Air Kruise's first aircraft was a Miles Messenger 2A, the first civil example of the model to be produced after World War II, which was delivered to Kennard's base at Lympne Airport, Kent, in August 1946. It was to be used for charter work and for pleasure flights. Over the next few years the fleet slowly expanded first with an Airspeed Consul, further light aircraft, and from 1950, De Havilland Dragon Rapides.

With the Rapides, on July 15, 1950 Air Kruise started scheduled passenger services from Lympne to Le Touquet, France, operated as "Trans-Channel Air Services in association with BEA".

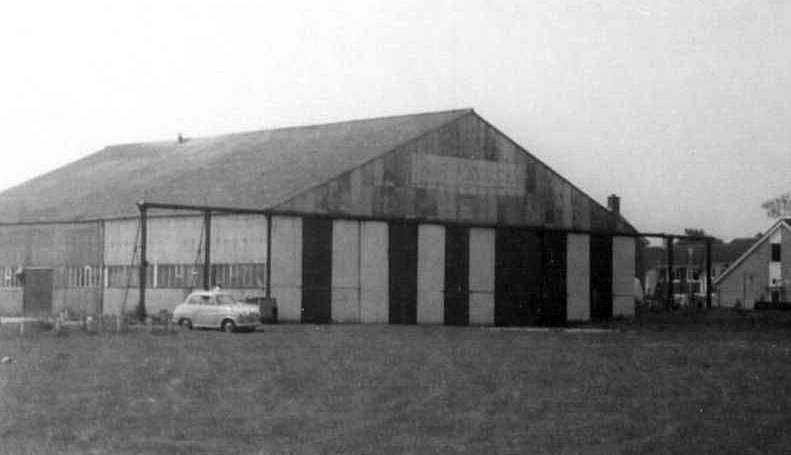
The extended main hangar at Ramsgate Airport with the faded Air Kruise logo on the front.

In June 1952 Air Kruise took a 21-year lease on Ramsgate Airport. The terminal was repaired after wartime bomb damage, and the hangar was extended. The airport was reopened on 27 June 1953, and it became Air Kruise's main base, while some operations remained at Lympne.

In the 1952 and 1953 seasons the Lympne - Le Touquet route operated as Trans Channel Airways. This was extended to Ramsgate when it was reopened. Air Kruise was granted a licence to operate a summer season route from either Lympne or Ramsgate to Birmingham, and they chose Ramsgate. There is no evidence that this route operated.

Lympne airport in 1953 was owned by the British Ministry of Civil Aviation. It would not solve the airfield's big problem – the muddiness that was causing aircraft to get stuck. Silver City, who were by far the major users of the airport with their Bristol Freighter car ferry service, therefore decided to build their own airfield at Lydd. Just seven months after that decision, and named Ferryfield, the new airport opened on 13 July 1954, with some of the airline's operations moving from Lympne immediately.

On 1 May 1954 Air Kruise had been taken over by British Aviation Services (BAS), trading as Britavia, who owned Silver City Airlines. Air Kruise kept its own identity as the Passenger Division of Silver City. It moved its Lympne operations completely to Lydd. It was now starting to operate Douglas Dakota aircraft, and in the summer of 1955, as Trans Channel Airways, operated two daily routes - Lydd – Le Touquet (six return flights per day) and Lydd – Ostend, Belgium (three returns per day).

A notable charter operation by Air Kruise during this period was the first ever licensed Inclusive Tour (IT) flight from Manchester Airport. On 29 May 1955 it operated Dakota G-AMYV to Ostend, the first of what has developed into Manchester Airport's main source of business.

In September 1955 Air Kruise placed a provisional order for six Handley Page HPR3 Heralds (powered by four Alvis Leonides Major piston engines). It seems to have lost interest after the Britavia takeover, and none were delivered.

In 1957 Air Kruise was operating a route called Blue Arrow between Lydd and Lyon Bron Airport as part of a coach – air – rail package between London and the south of France. On 26 April that year a Dragon Rapide was acquired for Air Kruise (Ireland) Ltd at Killarney and placed on the Irish register. This appears to have been an unsuccessful venture, as the aircraft was returned to the British register on 1 July the same year

On 28 October 1957 the Air Kruise operation officially joined the Silver City fleet, part of the airline Southern Division. Wing Commander Kennard (he had been promoted when he joined the Royal Auxiliary Air Force in 1949) became Silver City's deputy managing director. The fleet was soon repainted in Silver City markings. The operation of Ramsgate Airport was taken over by Skyflights Ltd in the spring of 1958. Thus ended Air Kruise's activities, and the company was formally wound up in 1962.

== Fleet list ==
Including aircraft registered to Air Kruise and Hugh Kennard. Data from UK CAA G-INFO and

Airspeed AS.65 Consul
G-AIUS from 1 January 1947 to 8 March 1948

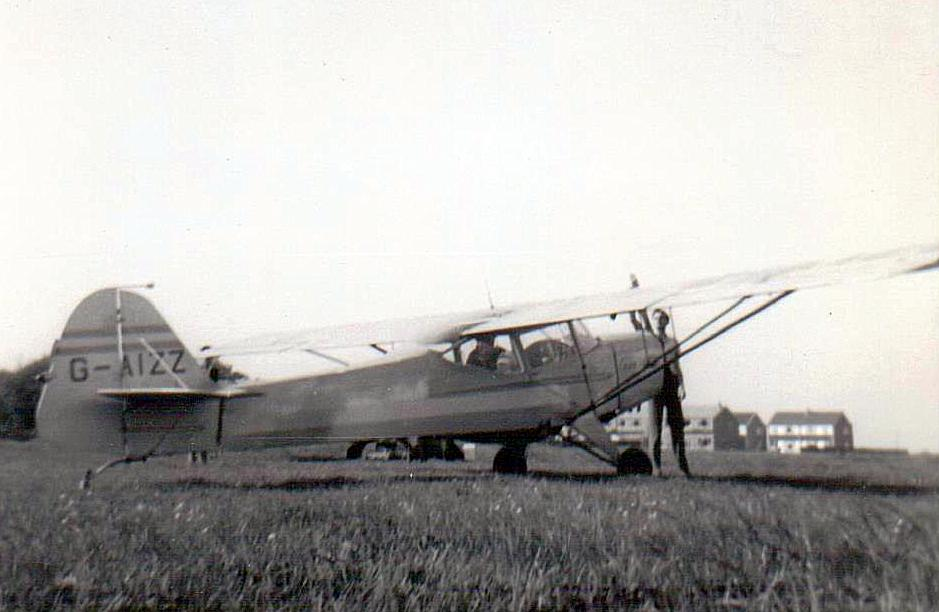
After Air Kruise, Auster G-AIZZ went to Skyfotos, and was back at Ramsgate with the Dog & Duck Inn's flying group in 1966.

Auster J/1 Autocrat
G-AIRC from 5 May 1950 to 6 November 1957
G-AIZZ from 21 September 1949 to 20 April 1961
Bristol 170 Freighter
Mk 21
G-AIFM from 7 January 1956 to 28 October 1957
G-AIME from 9 February 1956 to 28 October 1957
Mk 21E
G-AHJI from 21 December 1955 to 28 October 1957
De Havilland DH.89A Dragon Rapide (Note: Jane's 1953-4 reports that Air Kruise had 6 Rapides, so two or three may be missing from this list. It also says that they had 2 De Havilland Herons on order for delivery in 1953, but there is no record of these.)
G-AESR from 18 March 1953 to 22 July 1956
G-AEWL from 13 April 1950 to 24 November 1955
G-ALWK from 21 August 1951 to 15 April 1957
EI-AJO Air Kruise (Ireland) Ltd from 26 April 1957 to 1 July 1957 (Note: Before and after its time with Air Kruise, this was G-AGSH, and as of 2020 is at the Shuttleworth Collection at Old Warden airfield in the UK.)
Douglas Dakota
C-47A
G-ANLF from 20 April 1955 to 28 October 1957
C-47B
G-AMYV from 1 February 1956 to 28 October 1957
G-AMYX from 20 January 1956 to 28 October 1957
G-AMZB from 6 November 1956 to 28 October 1957
C-53D
G-AOBN from 20 April 1955 to 28 October 1957
Miles M.14A Hawk Trainer 3
Unknown 1951
Miles M.38 Messenger 2A
G-AHZS from 19 July 1946 to 22 May 1964 (Note: G-AHZS was registered to Hugh Kennard, but wore "Air Kruise (Kent) Ltd" titles from the start. Kennard flew it to 2nd place in the Folkestone Trophy Race held at Lympne on 1 September 1946.)
Miles M.65 Gemini 1A
G-AJWH from 31 January 1951 to 4 November 1957
Percival Proctor
Unknown 1949
Percival Q.6 Petrel
G-AFIX from 1 October 1946 to 21 November 1946

== See also ==
- List of defunct airlines of the United Kingdom
