= List of Biman Bangladesh Airlines destinations =

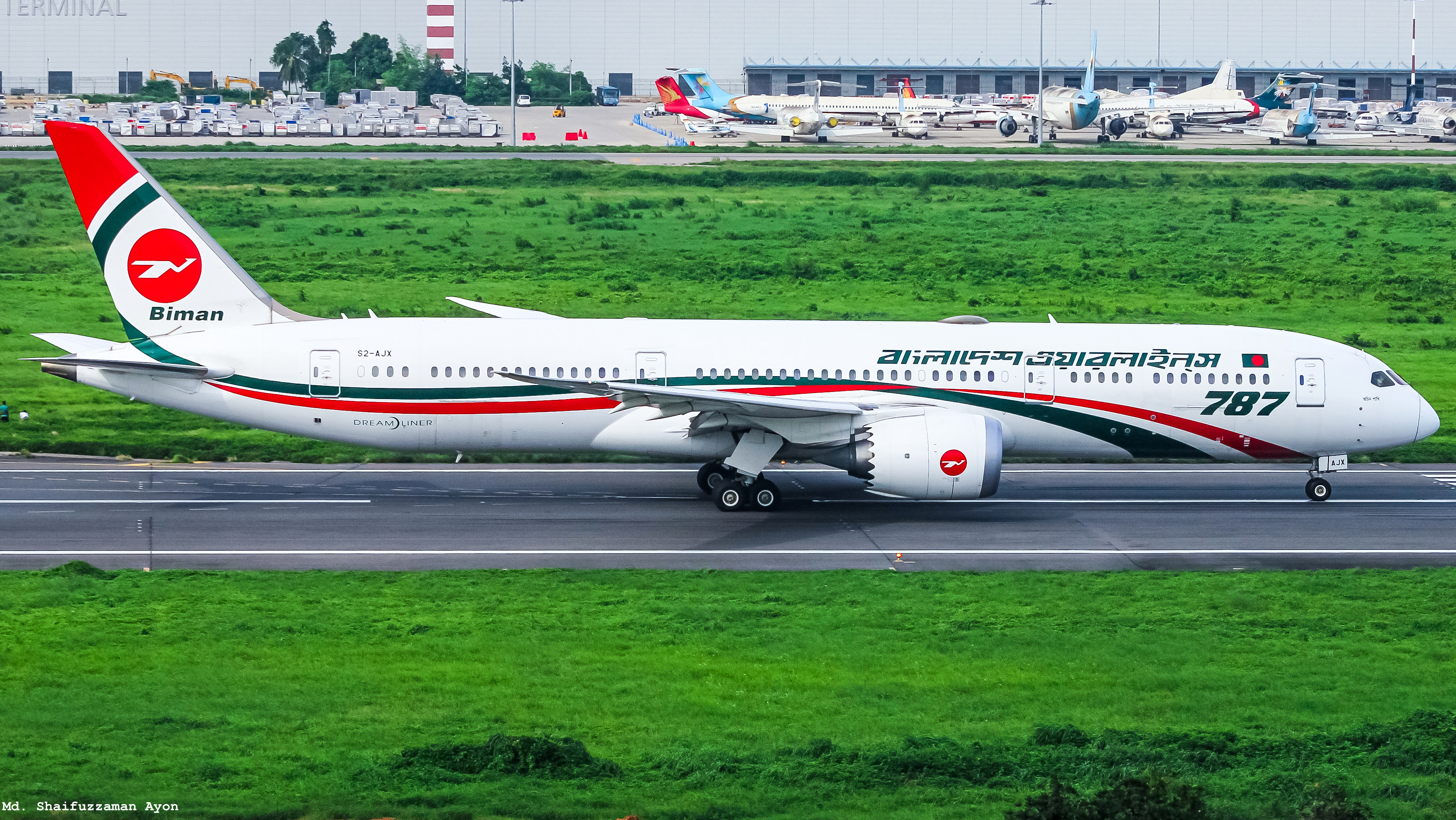
A Biman Bangladesh Airlines Boeing 787-9 at Hazrat Shahjalal International Airport, the airline's hub.

Biman Bangladesh Airlines was established in January 1972 as the Bangladesh national flag carrier. Operations started on 4 February 1972, initially on a domestic basis and using DC-3 aircraft, with services radiating from Dhaka to Chittagong, Jessore and Sylhet. International operations started on 4 March the same year, covering the London–Dhaka route on a charter basis under a sub-contract agreement with British Caledonian. From 1 January 1973 the same route, serving Gatwick Airport, started being operated by Donaldson International Airways on Biman's behalf. With a stopover in Bahrain, services to London in Biman's own right started on 19 June 1973, initially with a leased Boeing 707. By March 1975, the domestic route network comprised Chittagong, Comilla, Cox's Bazar, Ishurdi, Jessore, Sylhet and Thakurgaon and international services to Bangkok, Calcutta, Dubai, Kathmandu, and London were also provided. Frankfurt was first served in 1986. The carrier's international network comprised 26 destinations in March 2005, but in 2006 services to some of them were discontinued, owing to financial problems of an outdated fleet and a shortage of modern planes, starting with New York City in August that year, followed by some other destinations. Frankfurt was resumed in late March 2014. However, the service proved economically unviable and the destination was again removed from the route network in October the same year and flights to Rome were suspended in April 2015.

The airline had signed a deal with Boeing for ten new aircraft along with options for ten more in 2008. After getting delivery of the new planes, Biman expanded its destinations gradually and increased in-flight amenities, especially onboard Internet and WiFi; mobile telephony; and live TV streams. Biman Bangladesh Airlines is certified as safe to fly in Europe by the European Aviation Safety Agency. In addition, Biman has also passed the IATA Operational Safety Audit and since then, the airline has resumed flights to some of its previous destinations in Asia and Europe. As of May 2019, the airline serves 16 cities and destinations in 12 different countries across Asia and Europe. Biman Bangladesh Airlines restarted its direct flights to Delhi in 2019 after a gap of six years. Shortly after, the airline also resumed its direct flights to Manchester which was last served until October 2012. On 27 July 2022, Biman added its newest route to Toronto Pearson International Airport.. On January 29, 2026 Biman Bangladesh Airlines resume its Karachi flight after 13 years of closure.

== List ==
Following is a list of destinations the carrier flies to, according to its scheduled services, as of September 2026. Terminated destinations are also listed, as are primary and secondary hubs of the airline.

Country	City	Airport	Notes	Refs
Bahrain	Manama	Bahrain International Airport	Terminated	
Bangladesh	Barisal	Barisal Airport		
Bangladesh	Chattogram	Shah Amanat International Airport	Secondary hub	
Bangladesh	Cumilla	Comilla STOLport (Note: STOLport is an acronym for Short Takeoff and Landing Port)	Terminated	
Bangladesh	Cox's Bazar	Cox's Bazar International Airport		
Bangladesh	Dhaka	Hazrat Shahjalal International Airport	Hub	
Bangladesh	Ishwardi	Ishurdi STOLport	Terminated	
Bangladesh	Jashore	Jashore Airport		
Bangladesh	Rajshahi	Shah Makhdum Airport		
Bangladesh	Saidpur	Saidpur Airport		
Bangladesh	Sylhet	Osmani International Airport	Secondary hub	
Bangladesh	Thakurgaon	Thakurgaon STOLport	Terminated	
Belgium	Brussels	Brussels Airport	Terminated	
China	Guangzhou	Guangzhou Baiyun International Airport		
Canada	Toronto	Toronto Pearson International Airport		
France	Paris	Orly Airport	Terminated	
Germany	Frankfurt	Frankfurt Airport	Terminated	
Greece	Athens	Ellinikon International Airport	Airport closed	
Hong Kong	Hong Kong	Hong Kong International Airport		
India	Chennai	Chennai International Airport		
India	Delhi	Indira Gandhi International Airport		
India	Kolkata	Netaji Subhas Chandra Bose International Airport		
India	Mumbai	Chhatrapati Shivaji Maharaj International Airport	Terminated	
Iraq	Baghdad	Baghdad International Airport	Terminated	
Italy	Milan	Milan Malpensa Airport	Terminated	
Italy	Rome	Rome Fiumicino Airport		
Japan	Nagoya	Chubu Centrair International Airport	Terminated	
Japan	Tokyo	Narita International Airport		
Kuwait	Kuwait City	Kuwait International Airport		
Libya	Tripoli	Tripoli International Airport	Airport closed	
Malaysia	Kuala Lumpur	Kuala Lumpur International Airport		
Myanmar	Yangon	Yangon International Airport	Terminated	
Nepal	Kathmandu	Tribhuvan International Airport		
Netherlands	Amsterdam	Amsterdam Airport Schiphol	Terminated	
Oman	Muscat	Muscat International Airport		
Pakistan	Karachi	Jinnah International Airport		
Qatar	Doha	Doha International Airport (Note: All traffic activity at Doha was taken over by Hamad International Airport in 2014.)	Airport closed	
Qatar	Doha	Hamad International Airport		
Saudi Arabia	Dammam	King Fahd International Airport		
Saudi Arabia	Dhahran	Dhahran International Airport	Airport closed	
Saudi Arabia	Jeddah	King Abdulaziz International Airport		
Saudi Arabia	Medina	Prince Mohammad bin Abdulaziz International Airport		
Saudi Arabia	Riyadh	King Khalid International Airport		
Singapore	Singapore	Changi Airport		
Thailand	Bangkok	Don Mueang International Airport (Note: Most international traffic at Bangkok was taken over by Suvarnabhumi Airport in 2006)	Terminated	
Thailand	Bangkok	Suvarnabhumi Airport		
United Arab Emirates	Abu Dhabi	Zayed International Airport		
United Arab Emirates	Dubai	Dubai International Airport		
United Arab Emirates	Sharjah	Sharjah International Airport		
United Kingdom	London	Heathrow Airport		
United Kingdom	Manchester	Manchester Airport		
United States	New York City	John F. Kennedy International Airport	Terminated	

== See also ==
- Transport in Bangladesh
