= Air Faisal =

Cargo airline of the United Kingdom

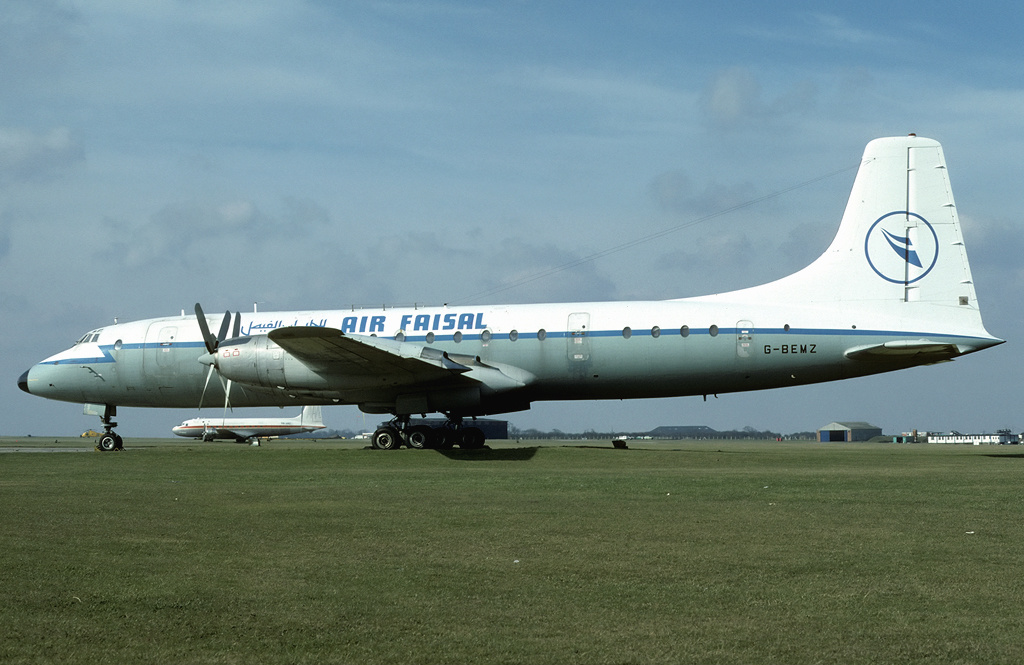
IATA	ICAO	Call sign
(none)	KV	FAISAL
- Founded: 1975
- Ceased operations: 1978
- Fleet size: 3
- Headquarters: Fulwood, Lancashire
- Key people: Patel Raj, Iqbal Raj (owners)

Air Faisal is a defunct cargo airline based in the United Kingdom, which operated a fleet of Bristol Britannia freighters during the 1970s.

== History ==
=== Initial Operations ===
Air Faisal was founded in 1975 by two British Indian businessmen (Patel and Iqbal Raj), with the intention of operating charter flights between Birmingham and destinations in the Persian Gulf using a single ex-RAF Bristol Type 235F Britannia freighter (registration G-BDLZ). These flights were intended to carry fresh produce to the owners' shops in Birmingham. The plans were delayed by the firm's lack of an AOC allowing them to operate the flights, which led to a dispute with the CAA, as Air Faisal's founders argued that, since they were operating the charters on behalf of Airwork India, this was not required. A compromise was negotiated which led to the aircraft being operated as with Air India flight numbers.

In February 1977, another Britannia (G-BEMZ) was purchased by the company, and in October of that year the CAA finally granted an AOC. A third Britannia, (5Y-AYR), was leased from African Safari Airways, and used to fly fresh fruit to Birmingham from Kenya.

=== Downfall ===
On 10 August 1978, G-BEMZ returned to Birmingham from Larnaka, Cyprus with a load of grapes on board. HM Revenue & Customs officers searched the aircraft and found around 100 kg of cannabis hidden in the aircraft, leading to its confiscation. Furthermore, corrosion caused by animal excrement from cattle flights to Milan made the remaining Britannia, G-BDLZ, no longer fit for purpose, leading to the aircraft being sold and eventually scrapped at Luton Airport in 1979. The airline's AOC was revoked by the CAA on September 7, 1978, and Patel was eventually convicted of smuggling cannabis resin into the United Kingdom. The impounded Britannia (G-BDLZ) was sold to Redcoat Air Cargo, and then to Katale Aero Transport.

== Destinations ==
- United Kingdom
  - Birmingham, Birmingham Airport
  - Manston, Manston Airport
- India
  - Bombay, Bombay Airport
- Italy
  - Milan, Milan Airport
- UAE
  - Dubai, Dubai International Airport
  - Sharjah, Dubai Sharjah Airport
- Cyprus
  - Larnaka, Larnaka Airport

== Fleet ==
The Air Faisal fleet consisted of the following aircraft over the airline's lifetime:

Air Faisal fleet
Aircraft	Total	Routes	Notes
Bristol Britannia	3		Cargo-only aircraft

== Incidents and accidents ==
, There were no incidents or accidents, fatal or otherwise, involving Air Faisal.
