= Bristol Britannia =

British four-engined turboprop airliner, 1952

Type 175 Britannia
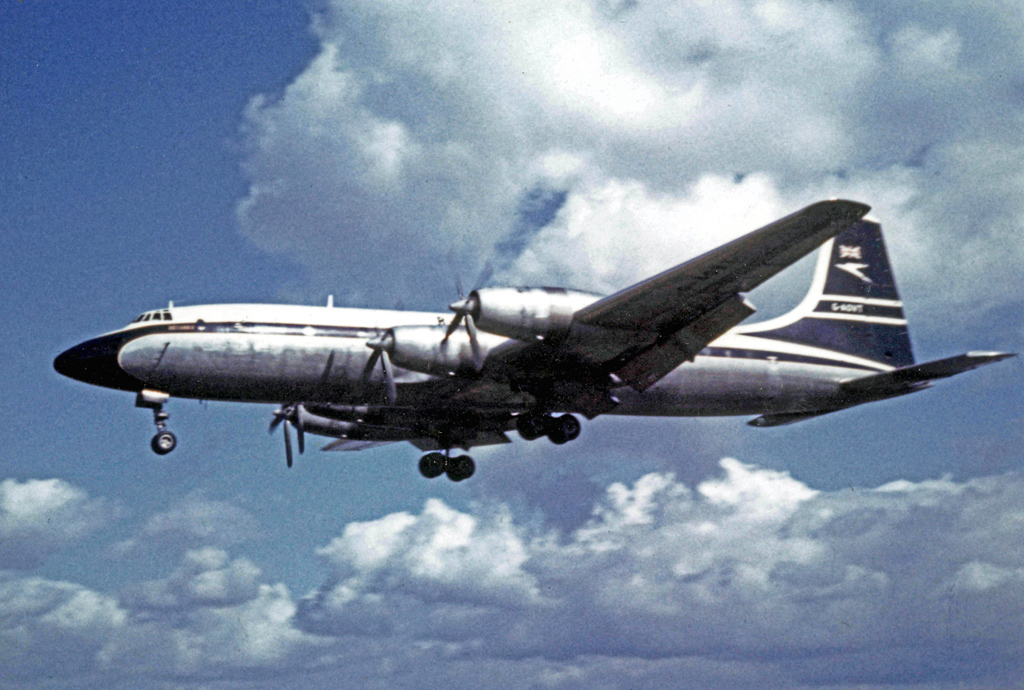
- BOAC Britannia Model 312 on a transatlantic flight at Manchester Airport in 1962.

General information
- Type: Turboprop airliner
- Manufacturer: Bristol Aeroplane Company
- Designer: Dr. Archibald E. Russell
- Status: Retired
- Primary users: BOAC Royal Air Force; Canadian Pacific Air Lines; Cubana de Aviación
- Number built: 85

History
- Manufactured: 1952–1960
- Introduction date: 1 February 1957 with BOAC
- First flight: 16 August 1952
- Variants: Canadair CP-107 Argus; Canadair CL-44/Canadair CC-106 Yukon
- Developed into: Conroy Skymonster

The Bristol Type 175 Britannia is a retired British medium-to-long-range airliner built by the Bristol Aeroplane Company in 1952 to meet British civilian aviation needs. During development two prototypes were lost and the turboprop engines proved susceptible to inlet icing, which delayed entry into service until remedied.

By the time development was complete, "pure" jet airliners from France, the United Kingdom, and the United States were about to enter service, and only 85 Britannias were built before production ended in 1960. The Britannia is considered one of the landmarks in turboprop-powered airliner design and was popular with passengers. It became known as "The Whispering Giant" for its quiet exterior noise and smooth flying, although the passenger interior remained less tranquil.

Canadair purchased a licence to build the Britannia in Canada, adding another 72 aircraft in two variants. These were the stretched Canadair CL-44/Canadair CC-106 Yukon, and the greatly modified Canadair CP-107 Argus maritime patrol aircraft.

== Design and development ==
=== Origins ===
In 1942, during the Second World War, Allied aircraft construction saw the British, of necessity, concentrating on heavy bombers, leaving the production of transport aircraft to the USA. This would have left Britain with little experience in transport construction at the end of the war. In 1943, a committee under Lord Brabazon of Tara investigated the future British civilian airliner market. The Brabazon Committee called for several aircraft to be developed to its specifications for Britain's civilian aviation needs.

Bristol won the Type I and Type III contracts, delivering their Type I design, the Bristol Brabazon in 1949. The requirement for the 1946 British Overseas Airways Corporation (BOAC) Medium Range Empire (MRE) Requirements coincided with the Type III, Specification C.2/47, issued in April 1947 by the Minister of Supply. The specifications called for an airliner capable of carrying 48 passengers and powered with Bristol Centaurus radial engines or Napier Nomad turbo-compound Diesel engine. Turboprop options were also considered, but they were so new that Bristol could not guarantee their performance.

Although company Proposals "X" for conversions of Lockheed Constellations to Centaurus 662 powerplants or "Y" for licence production of the Constellation were considered in late 1946, BOAC decided that a new design was preferred. After wrangling, the Ministry of Supply and BOAC agreed costs and the project went ahead being assigned the company designation Model 175 in July 1948. Three prototypes were ordered with the first being Mk 1 (Centaurus 662) and the second and third prototypes called Mk 2 (to be convertible to Bristol Proteus turboprops, then under development).

During development the Centaurus 663 engine was operated for testing in a Bristol Brigand RH745 and a 0.7 scale fin was flight tested on a Bristol Freighter G-AICT.

In October 1947, with work underway, Bristol had settled on a Centaurus-powered design with a gross weight of 103,000 lb (47,000 kg) and a payload of 13,300 lb (6,000 kg). The anticipated Karachi–Cairo run necessitated a 48-seat limit including sufficient fuel for the lengthy stage. On 5 July 1949, the Ministry of Supply ordered five prototypes with the understanding that BOAC would contract for 25 production aircraft. BOAC purchased options for 25 aircraft on 28 July powered by the Bristol Centaurus, but to be re-fitted with the Bristol Proteus when available.

=== Redefinition and prototypes ===
In November 1948, the Type 175 was revised again to accommodate 74 passengers and a longer wingspan in a contemplated long-range version aimed at long-haul Empire and transatlantic routes, rather than the medium-haul Empire routes originally planned. On reflection, BOAC decided that only the Proteus engine was viable, necessitating a further redesign eliminating the Centaurus option. Senior figures within BOAC such as the Deputy Chairman Whitney Straight considered the Proteus engine to be "an obsolete contraption". (Note: The Proteus was still powering SR.N4 hovercraft across the English Channel as late as 2000, and was still powering some warships in 1982 at the time of the Falklands War.) Despite BOAC's desire to have a turboprop engine, the Type 175 project was contingent on the Proteus passing a 150-hour type test.

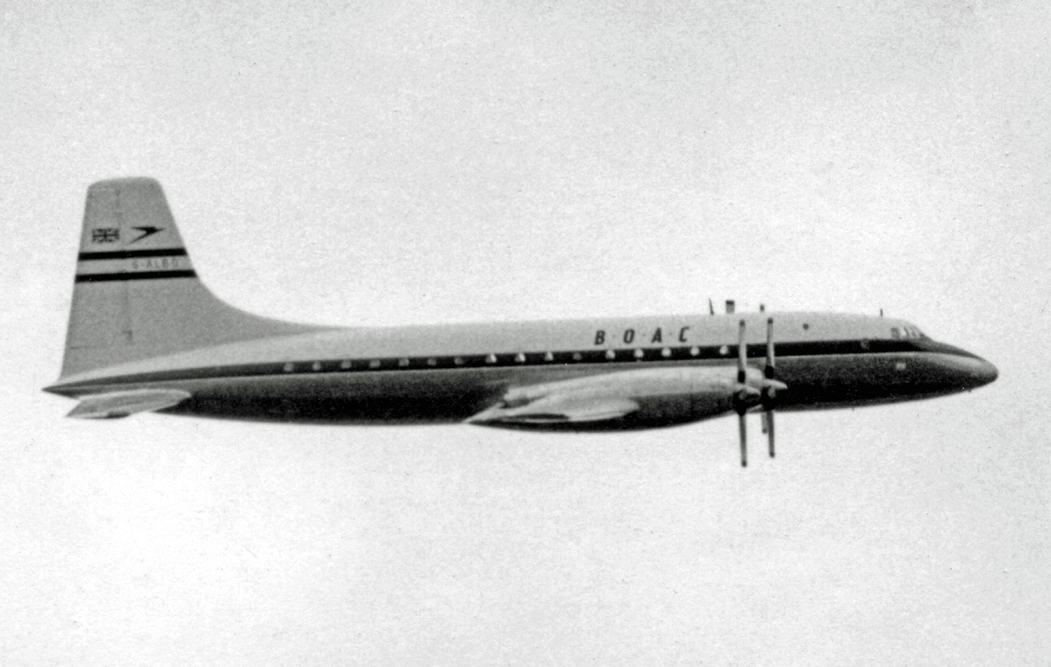
The prototype Britannia 101 G-ALBO in BOAC markings at the 1953 Farnborough Air Show

During April 1950, the airliner's name, Britannia, was selected. The name Britannia 101 was applied to first pair of prototypes, which were powered by the early Proteus 625, the successor to the 600 series engine that had already completed type trials. The first prototype, registered G-ALBO, with Bristol Chief Test Pilot A.J. "Bill" Pegg at the controls, first flew on 16 August 1952 at Filton Aerodrome. During the maiden flight, the over-sensitive flying controls led to wild pitching before Pegg restored control. During the landing approach, smoke filled the cockpit and the main undercarriage bogie temporarily stuck, only fully deploying seconds before landing. The snags were resolved and by September, the prototype was cleared to perform at the 1952 SBAC Display at Farnborough where spectators commented on the "quietness" of the giant airliner. In November 1952, Popular Science reported that by 1954 BOAC would have 25 of these aircraft on routes such as London-to-Tokyo over the Arctic and North Pole.

=== Delays ===
After three de Havilland Comets crashed without explanation in 1953 and 1954, the Air Ministry demanded that the Britannia undergo lengthy tests. Further delays were attributed to teething problems with the engine resulting in the loss in February 1954 of the second prototype, G-ALRX, caused by a failed reduction gear that led to an engine fire and the aircraft landing on the mudflats of the Severn Estuary. (Note: The personnel on board were unhurt. The aircraft was destroyed in the recovery effort, having belly landed and sunk into the soft mud of the estuary, defying all attempts at extracting it undamaged.) Finally, time was lost in resolving inlet icing issues (by selecting a different cruising height) that were discovered as the first aircraft were being delivered to BOAC. These were exaggerated by BOAC, devastated future sales and delayed the Britannia's introduction by two years.

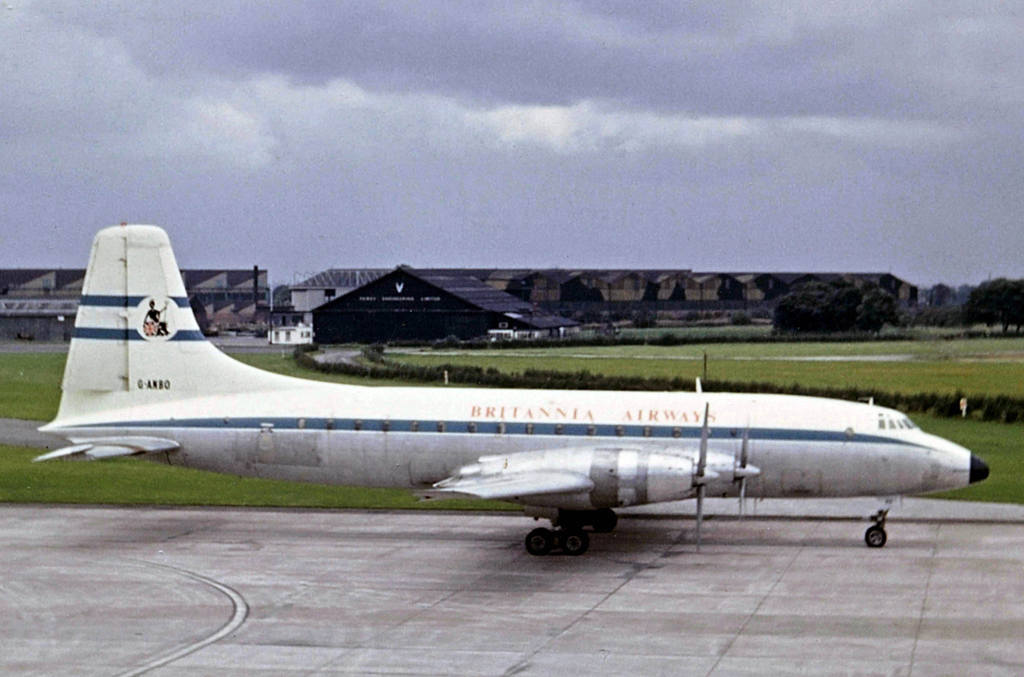
Britannia Airways Britannia Model 102 at Manchester Airport in 1965

The first prototype G-ALBO was modified to more closely approximate a production standard, but was retained by the company to undergo engine testing and development. Bristol revised the design into a larger transatlantic airliner for BOAC, resulting in the Series 200 and 300; the Britannia 300LR (Long-Range) was viewed as being "eminently suitable" for BOAC's services between London and Sydney. The purchase price for each Britannia 100-series aircraft was agreed by BOAC in 1955 at £768,000.

Australian airline Qantas considered the procurement of a Britannia fleet, however its protracted development eroded any competitive advantage against the Douglas DC-8 and de Havilland Comet 4. Route-proving trials continued through 1955, although orders were on the books from El Al and Canadian Pacific Air Lines alongside the standing order placed by BOAC.

During the first eight months of its operational trials, (Note: Aviation historian Roger Carvell typified the experience as "Around the World in 80 Delays", taking his cue from a popular refrain that was coined during the Britannia's troubled proving flights.) a total of 16 in-flight engine failures and 49 unscheduled engine changes punctuated the ongoing engine problem and delayed the Britannia's in-service date until February 1957, roughly two years late. The Britannia received a fair amount of attention in both the popular press and the British House of Commons, especially when it was revealed that BOAC had contemplated fitting Rolls-Royce Tynes to their fleet of Douglas DC-7s as an interim measure until the Britannia was cleared for service.

In 1956, Bristol's managing director Peter Masefield flew the tenth production Britannia, G-ANBJ, on a world sales tour. American interest was strong, since the Britannia seemed to be a faster, longer-range, higher-capacity sister of the Vickers Viscount, which was already a marketing success on US domestic routes, and, compared to the piston-engined DC-7C, itself a new type, the Britannia offered similar transcontinental or transatlantic range with greater speeds and the public appeal of more modern powerplants. Eastern Air Lines and TWA both wished to place orders, which might have forced competitors to follow suit. TWA's majority owner Howard Hughes took the controls of the Britannia for one flight and immediately requested 30 aircraft. However, the Americans wanted delivery within a couple of years, and Bristol, with its limited production facilities and the prior commitment to the BOAC order, could not meet that requirement, so, with the Boeing 707 and Douglas DC-8 jets expected in service by 1958–9, the opportunity passed.

Aviation historian Peter Pigott summarised the impact of the delays:

Had the Britannia appeared in 1950, when it was faster than every American aircraft, it would have put the British at the forefront of commercial aviation sales. Now, competing with the Boeing 707, the turboprop airliner had become passé. (Note: The Britannia could only have been available by 1950 if it had been ordered earlier. The world's first turboprop airliner, the Vickers Viscount, did not enter service until 1953. BOAC had shown similar indecisiveness with the earlier Avro Tudor.)

=== Related developments ===
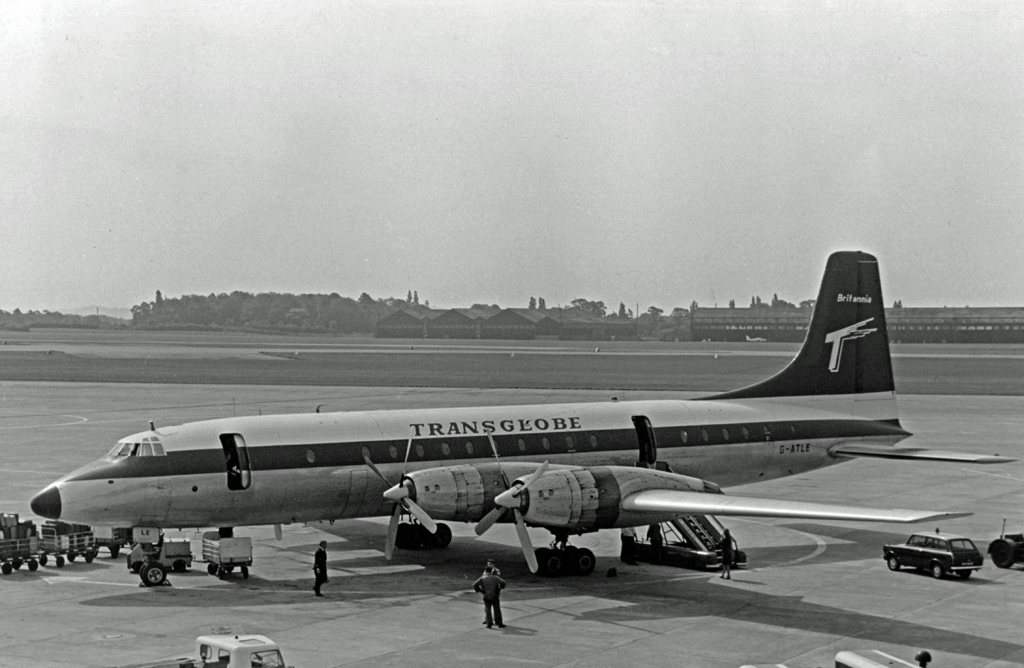
Ex-Canadian Pacific Air Lines Britannia Model 314 of Transglobe Airways at Manchester Airport in June 1966

In 1954, a licence was issued to Canadair to build the derivative Canadair CL-28/CP-107 Argus, and the Canadair CL-44/Canadair CC-106 Yukon. Based on the Britannia, the Argus maritime patrol and anti-submarine military aircraft was optimised for endurance on long-range patrol, not speed, and used four Wright R-3350-32W Turbo-Compound engines (Note: The Wright R-3350 was first used on the Boeing B-29 Superfortress.) that used less fuel at low altitude. Unlike its Britannia forebear, the Argus was a hybrid, using the Britannia wings, tail surfaces and landing gear matched to a "purpose-built", unpressurised fuselage. It substituted North American materials and standard parts for British parts.

The interior of the Argus was well equipped to conduct anti-submarine warfare — navigation, communication and tactical electronic equipment along with weapon loads that included bombs, torpedoes, mines and depth charges. A total of 33 Argus aircraft were built in two series (Mk 1 and Mk 2), serving the Royal Canadian Air Force (RCAF) and Canadian Forces from 1957 to 1982.

Canadair built 39 Canadair CL-44/Canadair CC-106 Yukon turboprop Rolls-Royce Tyne-powered aircraft, comprising 12 CC-106 Yukon for the RCAF and 27 CL-44D4 passenger/cargo variants for the civil market. Civilian operators typically operated the type as freighters. Four CL-44D4s were converted as CL-44Js with lengthened fuselages for service with the Icelandic "budget" airline Loftleiðir. The CL-44D4s were all built with swing-tails to allow straight-in cargo loading and served with a variety of carriers, most notably Flying Tiger Line. The similar CC-106 Yukon was used by the RCAF in a solely passenger configuration.

A final "one-off" development was the Conroy Skymonster, nicknamed Guppy, based on a Canadair CL-44D4 N447T. The prominent modification was an enlarged fuselage, like the Mini Guppy, which was produced by Jack Conroy's previous company, Aero Spacelines. After a long operational career as a freighter, the Guppy was stored at Bournemouth Airport in 2003 and was later sold.

== Operational history ==
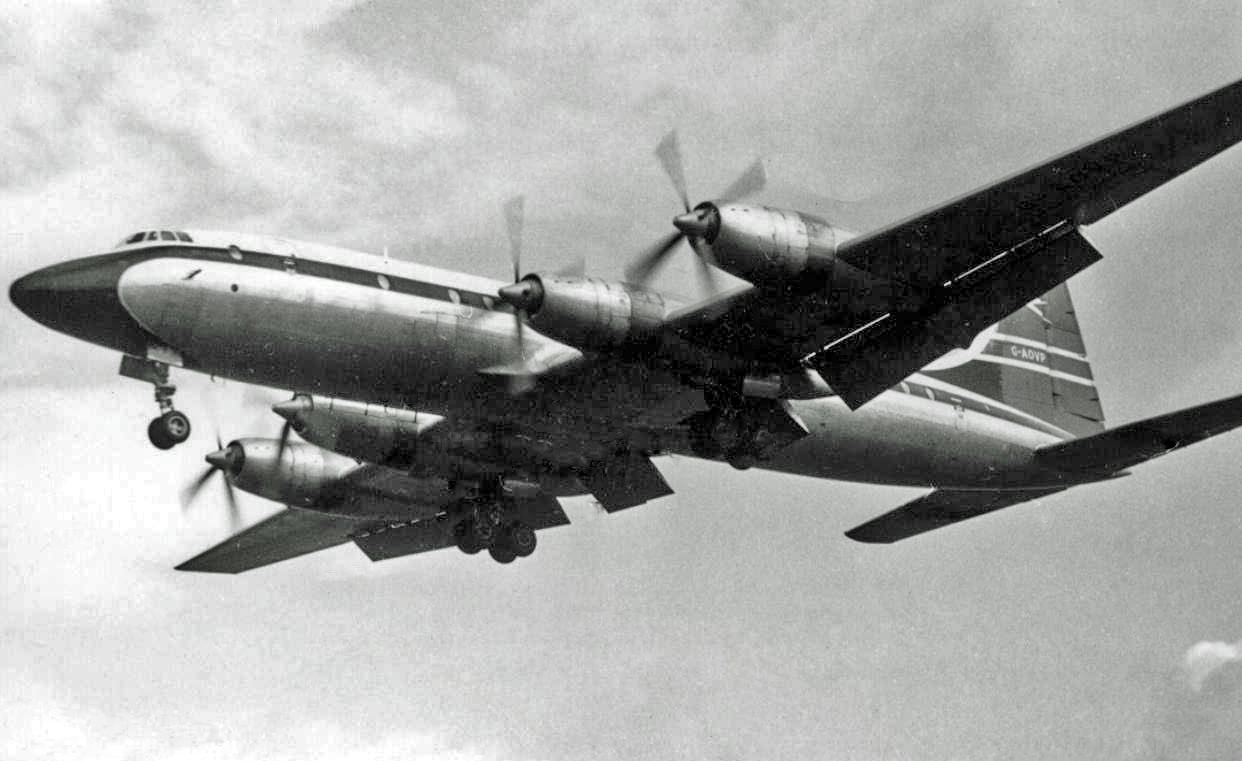
BOAC Britannia Model 312 in 1959

Following a long period of uneventful development flying trials and the fitting of a modified Proteus 765 series engine that greatly reduced breakdowns, a full Certificate of Airworthiness was awarded at the end of 1955. The first two Model 102s were delivered to BOAC on 30 December 1955 for crew training. The Model 102 began scheduled service on 1 February 1957 with a BOAC flight from London to Johannesburg, flights to Sydney following in March and to Tokyo in July. By August 1957, the first 15 Model 102 aircraft had been delivered to BOAC. The last 10 aircraft of the order were built as Series 300 aircraft for transatlantic flights.

In April 1959, a Model 102 Britannia was leased by BOAC to Ghana Airways for flights between Accra and London, and several more Britannias were purchased by the airline in the early 1960s. The Model 102 was eventually made available to other BOAC associates, including Cathay Pacific, Central Africa, East African, Nigeria and Malayan airlines.

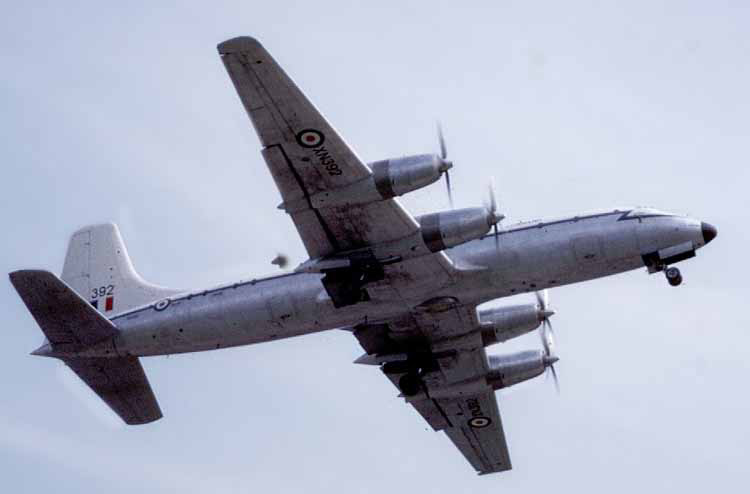
Royal Air Force Britannia C2 (Model 253) Acrux in 1964

The next production series was based on the long-range, mixed passenger/freight Model 200 series that was intended for civil airline use, but ultimately Bristol offered the series to the Royal Air Force (RAF) instead. The production series of three Model 252 and 20 Model 253 aircraft were purchased by RAF Transport Command in 1959, assigned the designation Britannia C.2 (first Model 252 series) and C.1 (Model 253 series). Those in RAF service were allocated the names of stars, such as "Arcturus", "Sirius" and "Vega". On retirement from the RAF in 1975, many Model 200 series were subsequently used by independent civil operators for cargo operations, harkening back to their original intended role.

Although the Bristol Model 302 was built first as part of the original BOAC order, BOAC released this series to other airlines; Aeronaves de Mexico took two Model 302s, which entered service in December 1957. The 18 Bristol Britannia 312s for BOAC were delivered from September 1957 with its service introduction on the first-ever non-stop flight from London to Canada on 19 December 1957. In late December 1957, BOAC began regular Britannia flights from London to New York. Other airlines, such as Israel's El Al, also operated the Britannia on transatlantic routes.

In 1959, BOAC started flying the Britannia across the Pacific to Tokyo and Hong Kong, thus extending their network round the world. The westbound routing in 1959 for these intercontinental BOAC Britannia flights between the UK and Asia was London-New York-San Francisco-Honolulu-Wake Island-Tokyo-Hong Kong.

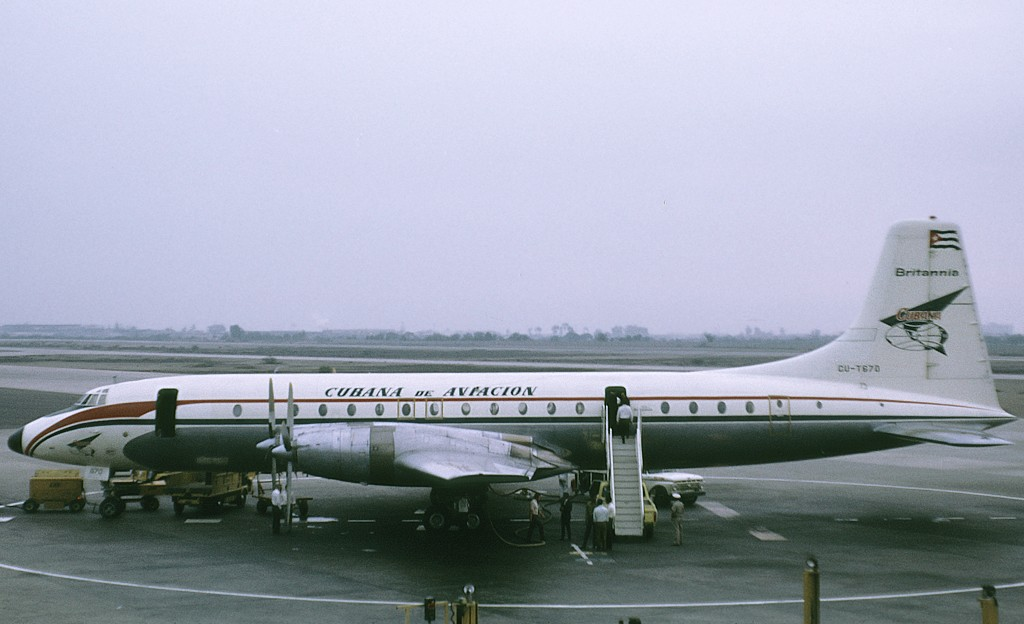
Cubana de Aviacion Britannia 318 at Lima Peru in 1972

On 1 April 1958 Canadian Pacific Air Lines took delivery of the first of six Model 314 Britannias, with an additional two Model 324s (built to a 320 standard) arriving later and sold to Cathay Pacific in 1961. BOAC ordered seven Model 302s, but never took delivery, instead they were taken on by airlines including Aeronaves de México and Ghana Airways. The main long-range series were the 310s, of which BOAC took 18 and, after deliveries began in September 1957, put them into service between London and New York City; in March 1964 BOAC owned 50 aircraft, 10 being Britannia 312s. BOAC's last scheduled Britannia flight was April 1965.

The 310 series (the Model 318) also saw transatlantic service with Cubana de Aviación starting in 1958, in spite of the Cuban Revolution the airline had a special accord with British aircraft manufacturers to maintain this model of aircraft. In 1975, multiple Cuban Britannias were used to transport hundreds of soldiers of the Cuban Revolutionary Armed Forces to Angola in Operation Carlota, a proxy war. Cubana de Aviación continued to fly its fleet of Britannias until March 1990.

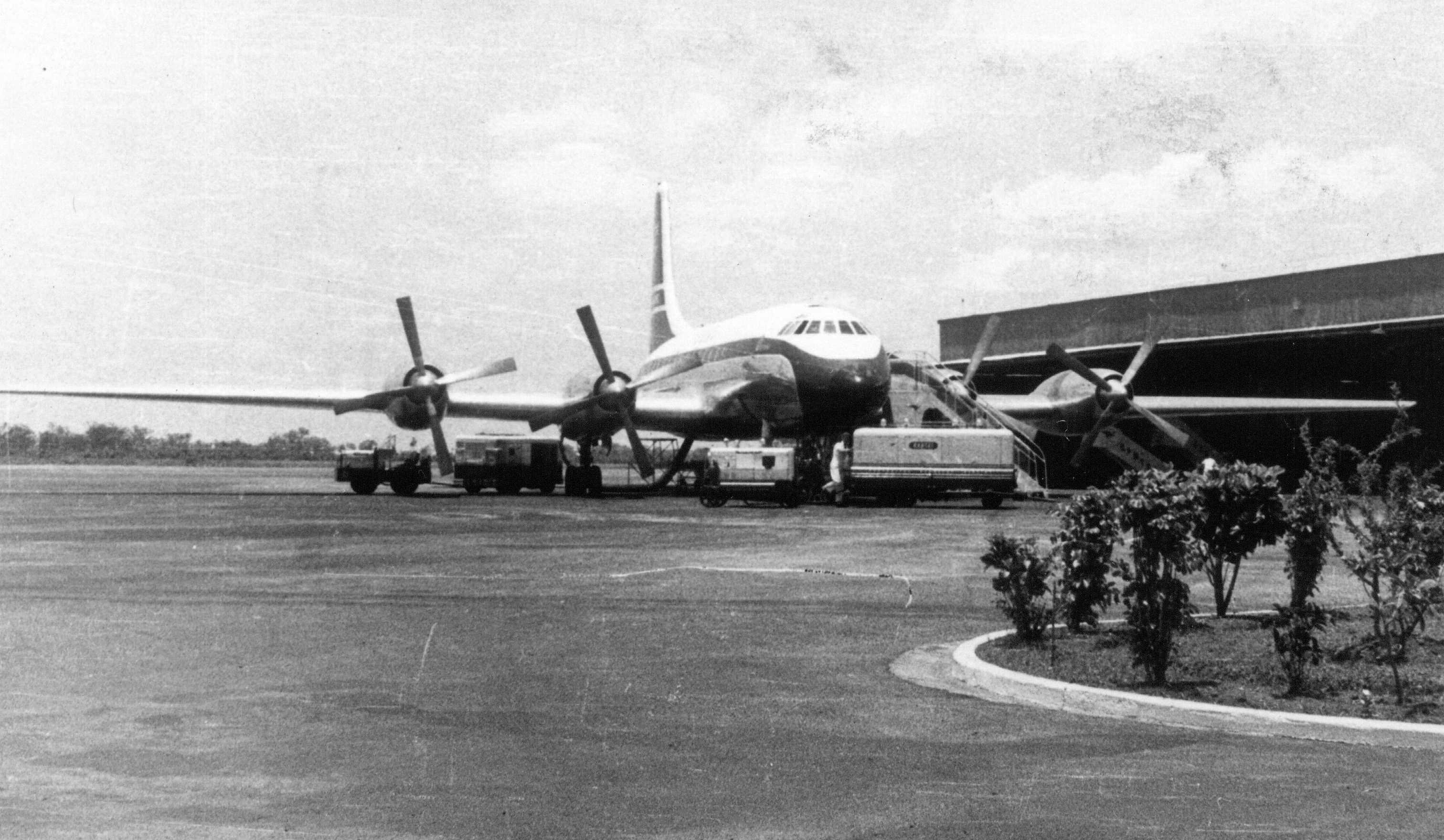
BOAC Britannia Model 312 at Darwin Airport, c. 1958

Following the purchase of remaining spare parts from the Royal Aircraft Establishment and Cubana, Zaïrois airlines continued to operate several Britannias into the early 1990s on regular cargo flights from N'djili Airport to various destinations within the country.

Most aircraft were built by Bristol at Filton, but 30 were built at Belfast by Short Brothers and Harland. Due to the extended development instead of a projected production of 180 Britannias, only 80 were sold. The negative experience with the development of the Britannia caused BOAC to be more cautious towards other British-made aircraft such as the Vickers VC10. Throughout the Britannia's lifespan, the engine icing condition remained a "continual potential hazard" that flight crews ultimately learned to manage with a "high-lo" flight regime that minimised the danger, Squadron Leader David Berry who had 5,000 hours on the type characterised it as flying "Beauty and the Beast." Aeroplane in "100 Great British Aircraft" (2008) said the Britannia counted among the "greats".

== Variants ==
=== Bristol Model 175 ===
Mk 1
Prototype powered by Bristol Centaurus 662, fuselage length of 114 ft (35m), span 120 ft (36.5 m), seating for 48 passengers, not built
Mk 2
Two prototypes powered by either Bristol Centaurus 662 or Bristol Proteus 600; with the Proteus, the fuselage length of 114 ft (35m) was fitted with a longer wingspan 140 ft (43 m) and reduced seating for 36 passengers, two prototypes planned, none built.

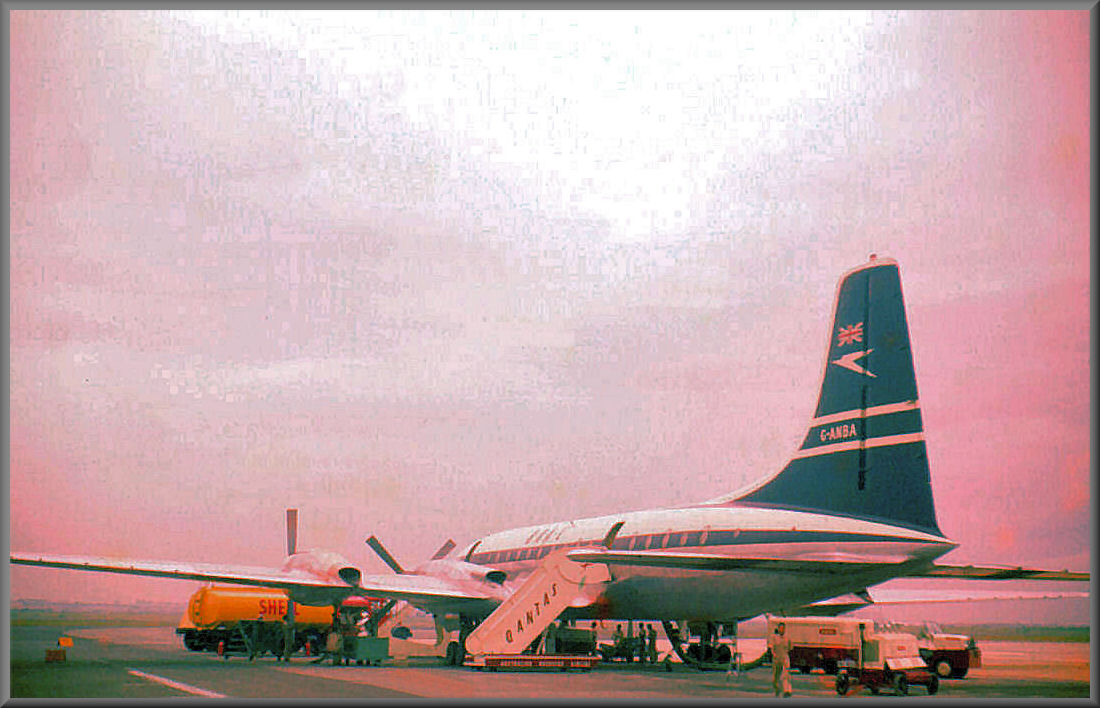
BOAC Bristol Britannia Model 102 G-ANBA, c. 1959

=== Series 100 ===
Seventy-four passenger airliner with 114 ft (35m) fuselage and powered by four Bristol Proteus 705

101
Prototypes, two initially powered by Proteus 625 and soon after re-engined with the Proteus 755, later the first prototype G-ALBO was used for development testing of the Bristol Orion in 1956 and the Proteus 765 in 1957.
102
Production aircraft for BOAC, 25 ordered with the last 10 cancelled in favour of the 300 series, 15 built.

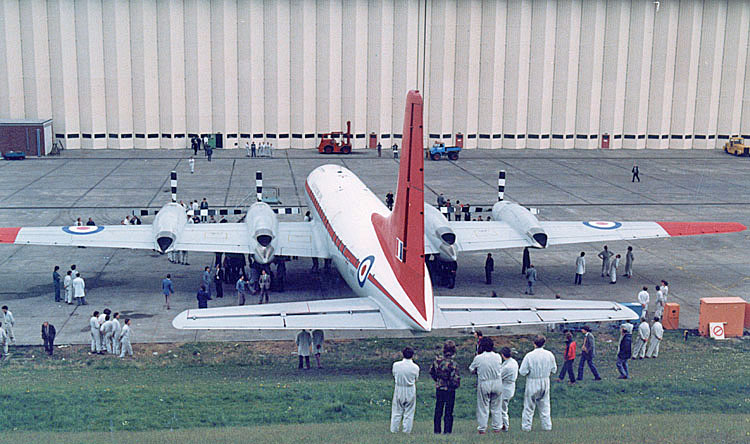
UK Ministry of Defence Britannia 312F XX367 visiting the maker's factory at Filton on 29 April 1983, the 25th anniversary of its first flight. As a civil airliner, it had flown for BOAC, British Eagle and Air Spain.

=== Series 200 ===
All cargo variant with a 124 ft 3 in (38 m) fuselage, BOAC option for five was cancelled, none built.

=== Series 250 ===
Similar to the 200 series, but mixed passenger and freight.

252
Originally ordered by the Ministry of Supply for intended lease to charter operators, but delivered to the Royal Air Force, as the Britannia C2. Fitted with a heavy-duty floor in forward area of fuselage and cargo door, three built.
253
Passenger/freight variant for the Royal Air Force, designated Britannia C1. Fitted with full length heavy-duty floor and provision for rearwards-facing seats, as preferred by the RAF. Capacity for 115 troops or equivalent in cargo, 20 built. Aircraft later sold on the civil market as freighters designated Series 253F.

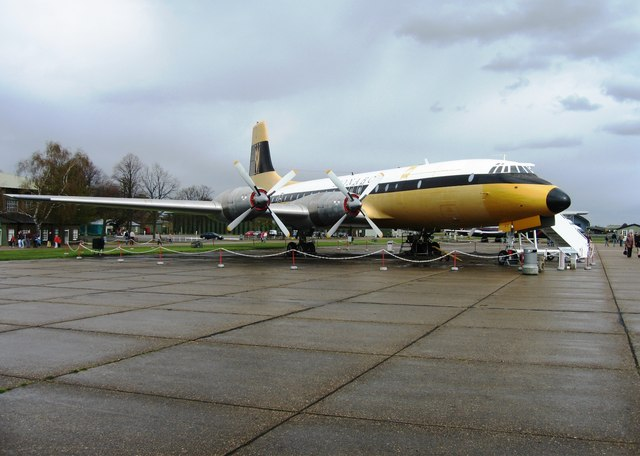
Britannia Model 312 formerly flying for Monarch Airlines now on display at Duxford Aerodrome

=== Series 300 ===
Passenger-only version of the 200 series, capable of carrying up to 139 (originally 99) passengers, medium-fuel capacity.

301
One Filton-built company prototype, used the same wing and fuel capacity of the Model 100; first flew: 31 July 1956.
302
Belfast-built production, 10 ordered by BOAC, but cancelled in favour of 305; seven were begun to this standard with two delivered to Aeronaves de Mexico.
305
Five Belfast-built 302s modified for longer-range, but with limited takeoff weight due to thinner fuselage skin and lighter landing gear. Originally ordered by Capital Airlines, which were cancelled and then for Northeast Airlines, which also cancelled. All modified to other variants.
306
One former Series 305 leased to El Al pending delivery of last Series 313. Later converted to Series 307.
307
Two of the ex-BOAC Northeast 305 order (one formerly the El AL Series 306) to Air Charter Limited September 1958 and March 1959, with a new designation: Model 307. Later to British United Airways.
307F
1960s conversion of 307 to freighter (both converted).
308
Two former 305s ordered by Transcontinental SA of Argentina in 104-passenger configuration.
308F
1960s conversion of 308 to freighter for British Eagle (both converted).
309
One former 305 (leased to Ghana Airways).

=== Series 310 ===
As 305 series, but with strengthened fuselage skin and undercarriage. Long-range fuel capacity and was originally known as 300LR.

311
One prototype originally known as a 300LR.
312
Production aircraft for BOAC, 18 built.
312F
1960s conversion of 312 to freighter (five converted).
313
Production aircraft for El Al, four built.
314
Production aircraft for Canadian Pacific Air Lines, six built.
317
Production aircraft for Hunting-Clan Air Transport in 124 passenger trooping configuration, two built.
318
Production aircraft for Cubana de Aviación, four built. Delivery taking place on 15 December 1958, later one leased to Cunard Eagle in 1960–1961 and this same airliner leased to CSA in 1962.
319
1960s conversion of 312 for Ghana Airways (one aircraft).
320
Variant for North American market, order for Trans World Airlines not concluded, two built were completed as Series 324s.
324
Two Series 320s built for Canadian Pacific Air Lines, later purchased by Cunard Eagle Airways in 1961.

== Operators ==
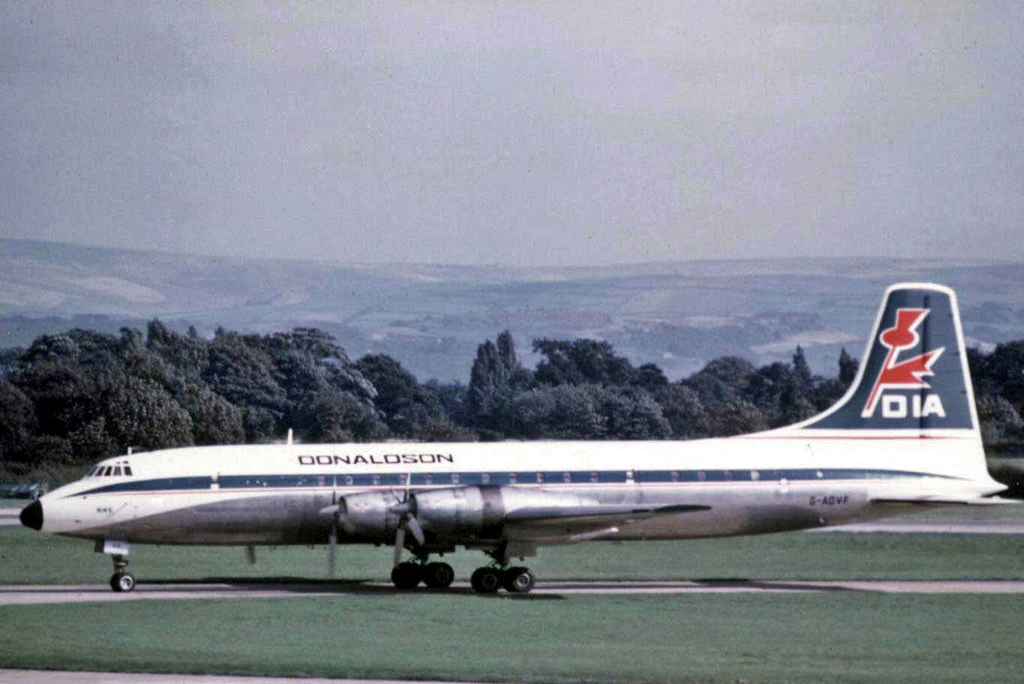
Donaldson Airways Britannia Model 312 G-AOVF at Manchester Airport, 1971

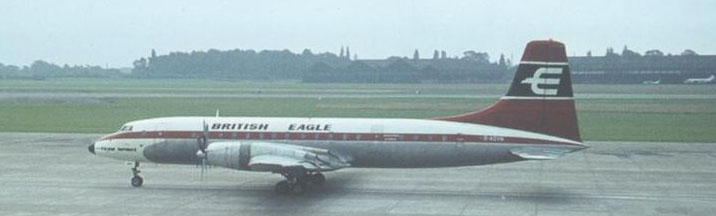
British Eagle Britannia Model 312 at Manchester England, 1964

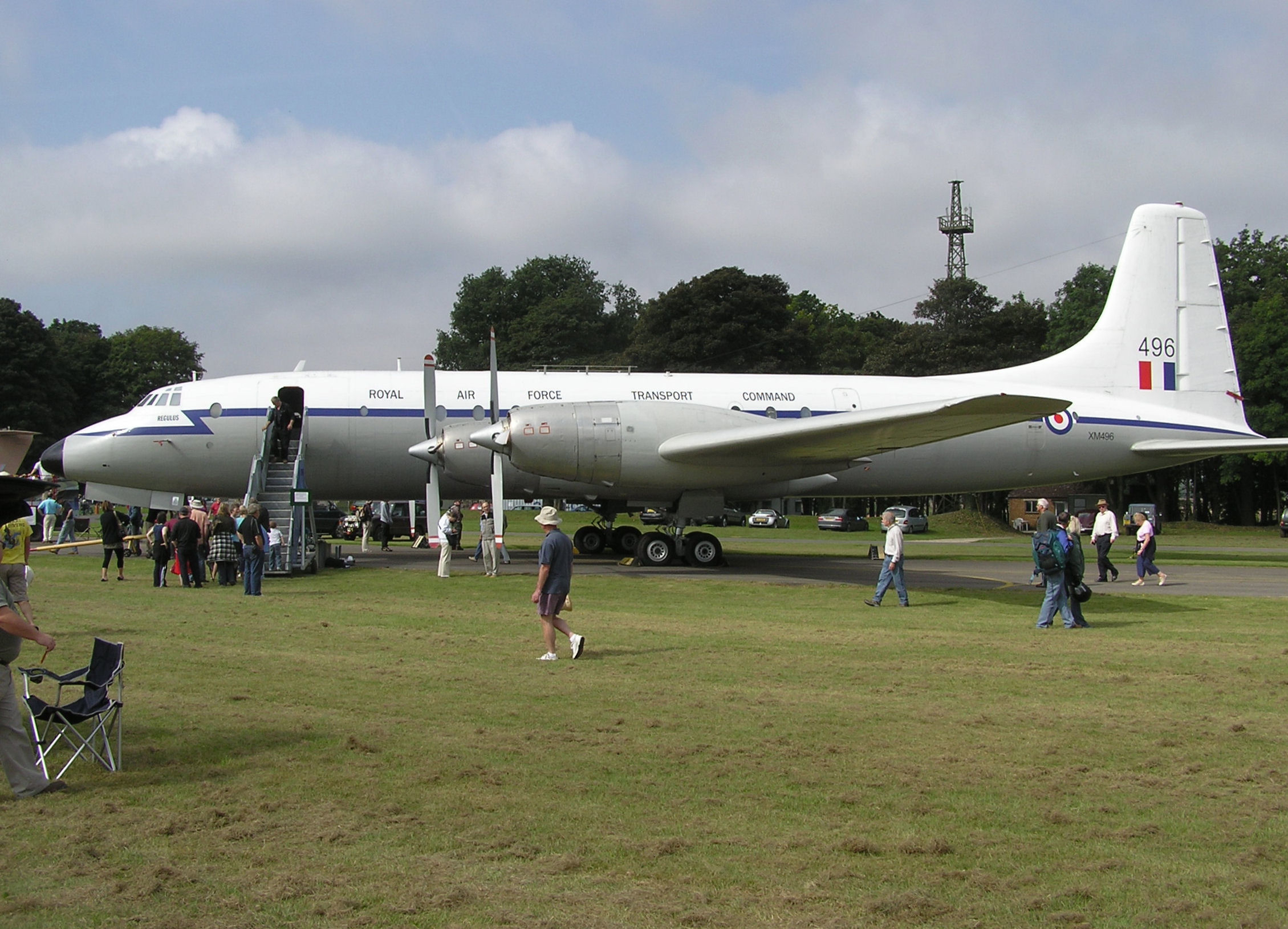
Ex-RAF Britannia C2 (Model 253) Regulus as of 2007 is being restored by the Bristol Britannia Preservation Society at Cotswold Airport, England

=== Civilian operators ===
Argentina

- Aerotransportes Entre Rios
- Transcontinental SA

Australia

- Southern Cross International (leased)

Belgium

- Young Cargo

Burundi

- Centre Air Afrique

Canada

- Canadian Pacific Air Lines

Cuba

- Aerocaribbean
- Cubana de Aviación

Czechoslovakia

- CSA leased two aircraft from Cubana de Aviación (1961–1964 and 1963–1969).

Ghana

- Ghana Airways
- Gemini Air Transport

Indonesia

- Indonesian Angkasa Civil Air Transport

Ireland

- Aer Turas
- Interconair

Israel

- El Al – An El Al Bristol Britannia was used by Israel to fly Nazi war criminal Adolf Eichmann out of Argentina after his capture in 1960.

Kenya

- African Cargo Airlines
- African Safari Airways

Kenya, Uganda, Tanganyika and Zanzibar

- East African Airways (leased from BOAC)

Liberia

- Liberia World Airways

Malaysia

- Malayan Airways

Mexico

- Aeronaves de México

Spain

- Air Spain

Switzerland

- Globe Air operated two former El Al 313s between 1964 and 1967.

United Arab Emirates

- Gaylan Air Cargo (United Arab Emirates)

United Kingdom

- Air Charter
- Air Faisal
- BKS Air Transport
- British Overseas Airways Corporation (BOAC)
- Britannia Airways
- British Eagle
- British United Airways
- Caledonian Airways
- Cathay Pacific
- Cunard Eagle Airways
- Donaldson International Airways
- Hunting-Clan Air Transport
- International Air Services
- Invicta International Airlines
- Lloyd International Airways
- Monarch Airlines
- Redcoat Air Cargo
- Transglobe Airways

Zaire

- Domaine de Katale
- Katale Air Transport
- Lukum Air Services
- Transair Cargo

=== Military operators ===
United Kingdom

- Aeroplane and Armament Experimental Establishment
- Royal Air Force
  - No. 99 Squadron RAF
  - No. 511 Squadron RAF

Cuba

- Cuban Air Force

== Accidents and incidents ==
Fourteen Britannias were lost with a total of 365 fatalities between 1954 and 1980. The worst accident was the 1967 Nicosia Britannia disaster with a loss of life totalling 126.

- On 4 February 1954, the second Britannia prototype was on a test flight when it crashed at Severn Beach, Gloucestershire. No. 3 engine indicated a loss of oil pressure so the crew shut it down. The crew restarted No. 3 but a fire broke out and could not be contained. No. 4 engine was then shut down as a precaution. On approach to Filton Airport, there was concern that the uncontrolled fire would lead to a failure of the main spar so the pilot, William "Bill" Pegg, elected to make an emergency landing on the mudflats of the Severn Estuary. There were no fatalities.
- On 6 November 1957, the 300 series prototype crashed during a test flight, killing the 15 occupants.
- On 24 December 1958, a BOAC Britannia 312 on a test flight crashed at Winkton, killing nine of the passengers and crew on board.
- On 5 July 1960, a Cuban Bristol Britannia 138 was hijacked by two co-pilots and diverted to Miami.
- On 22 July 1962, Canadian Pacific Air Lines Flight 301 a Britannia 314 was destroyed during an attempted "go-around" following a three-engined approach at Honolulu Airport, Hawaii, killing 27 of the 40 on board.
- On 29 February 1964, British Eagle International Airlines Flight 802/6 crashed into the Glungezer mountain near Innsbruck killing all 83 people aboard.
- On 1 September 1966, Britannia Airways Flight 105 crashed while landing at Ljubljana, Slovenia (then Yugoslavia), resulting in a total of 98 fatalities out of 117 passengers and crew. The probable cause was the flight crew having failed to set their altimeter to QFE instead of QNH, creating a 980 feet (300 m) error in indicated altitude.

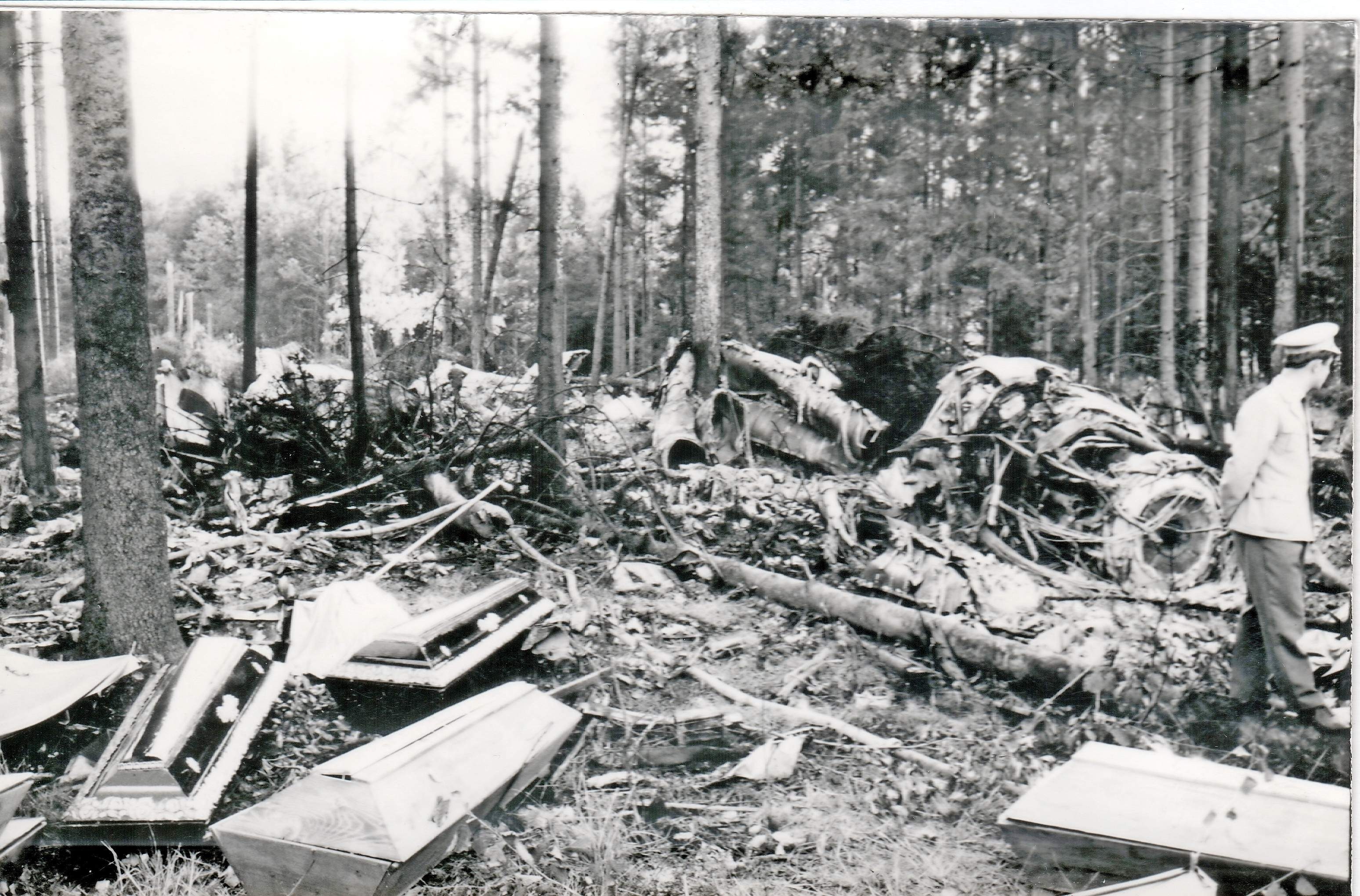
Britannia Airways Flight 105 crash in Slovenia 1966

- On 20 April 1967, a Globe Air Britannia 313 was on a flight from Bangkok to Basel with intermediate stops at Colombo, Bombay (Mumbai) and Cairo. The crew did not fly to Cairo, but elected to fly to Nicosia instead, where a missed approach and subsequent low circuit ended in impact near the airport perimeter.
- On 12 October 1967, "Sirius" – a Royal Air Force C1 – was damaged beyond repair after over-running the runway at RAF Khormaksar, Aden.
- On 30 September 1977, an Interconair Britannia 253G was on a ferry flight. On approach to Shannon Airport severe vibration was experienced at a height of 300 feet. The approach was abandoned and an overshoot was commenced. The aircraft continued to sink and collided with the ground, short of, and to the right of, the runway. The aircraft bounced and the right wing broke off. The aircraft then skidded and caught fire. All six people on board survived.
- On 16 February 1980, Redcoat Air Cargo Flight 103 crashed at Billerica, Massachusetts, shortly after taking off from Boston. The probable cause was an accumulation of ice and snow on the airframe before takeoff and a further accumulation of ice when it was then flown into moderate to severe icing conditions. Contributing to the cause were encounters with wind shear, downdrafts, and turbulence during the climb. Of eight crew and passengers, seven died and one was seriously injured.

== Surviving aircraft ==
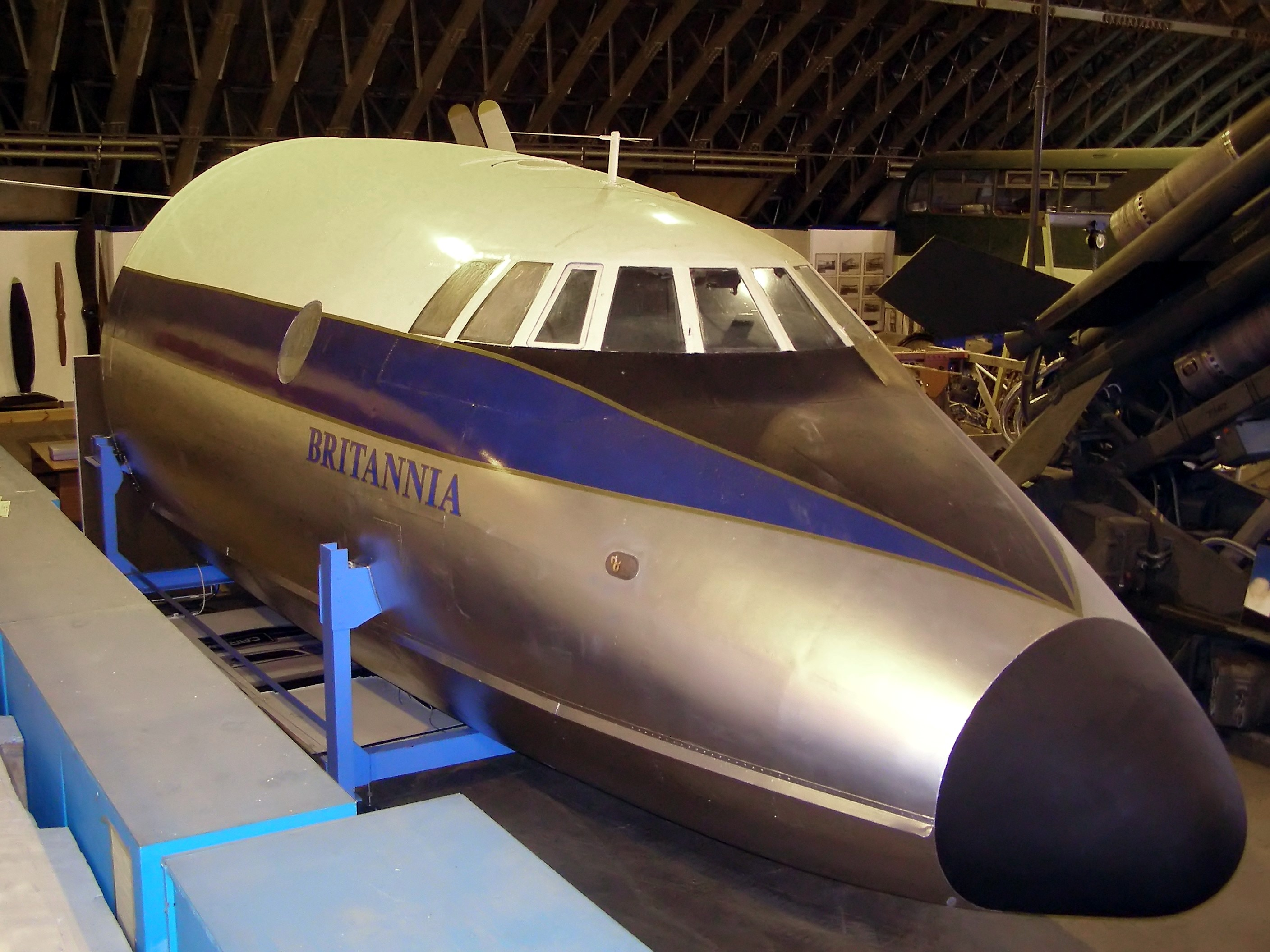
Nose of second prototype Britannia G-ALRX at the Bristol Aero Collection.

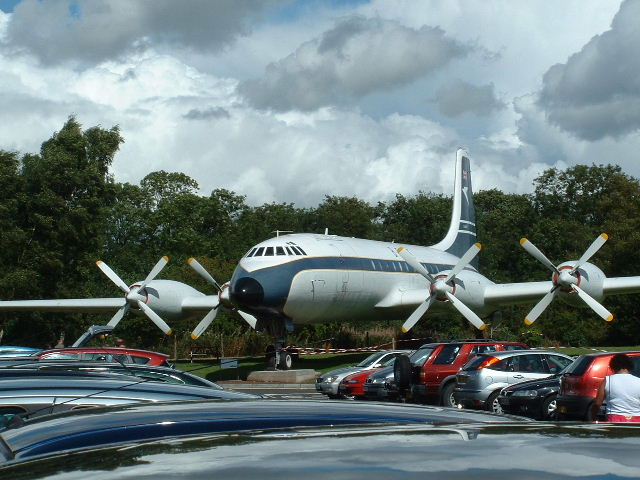
Bristol Britannia G-AOVF in BOAC livery at RAF Museum Cosford in 2005. Although later repainted in Royal Air Force markings (as XM497) to fit the museum's theme, this specific aircraft never saw military service.

- Britannia 101 (G-ALRX) - Forward fuselage is at Aerospace Bristol. This is the second prototype aircraft, damaged in the Severn Estuary crash.
- Britannia 308F (G-ANCF) - Removed from Kemble, and reassembled in early 2007 in Liverpool, England. Under restoration on the former airside apron behind the Crowne Plaza Liverpool John Lennon Airport Hotel, which was the original terminal building of Liverpool Speke Airport.
- Britannia 312 (G-AOVF) - On display at the Royal Air Force Museum Cosford, England, in RAF Air Support Command colours as XM497 "Schedar". ( Media related to see photos at Wikimedia Commons)
- Britannia 312F (G-AOVS) - Derelict fuselage on the fire training dump at London Luton Airport, Luton, England, in Redcoat Air Cargo colours as G-AOVS "Christian". Is visible from the Wigmore Valley Park playing fields.
- Britannia 312 (G-AOVT) - On display at the Imperial War Museum Duxford, England, in Monarch Airlines colours. ( Media related to see photos at Wikimedia Commons)
- Britannia C.1 (XM496) Regulus - On display at Cotswold Airport, England, in RAF colours. ( Media related to see photos at Wikimedia Commons)
- Britannia 307F (5Y-AYR) - Cockpit preserved in Burnham-on-Sea, Somerset, England.

== Specifications (Series 310) ==
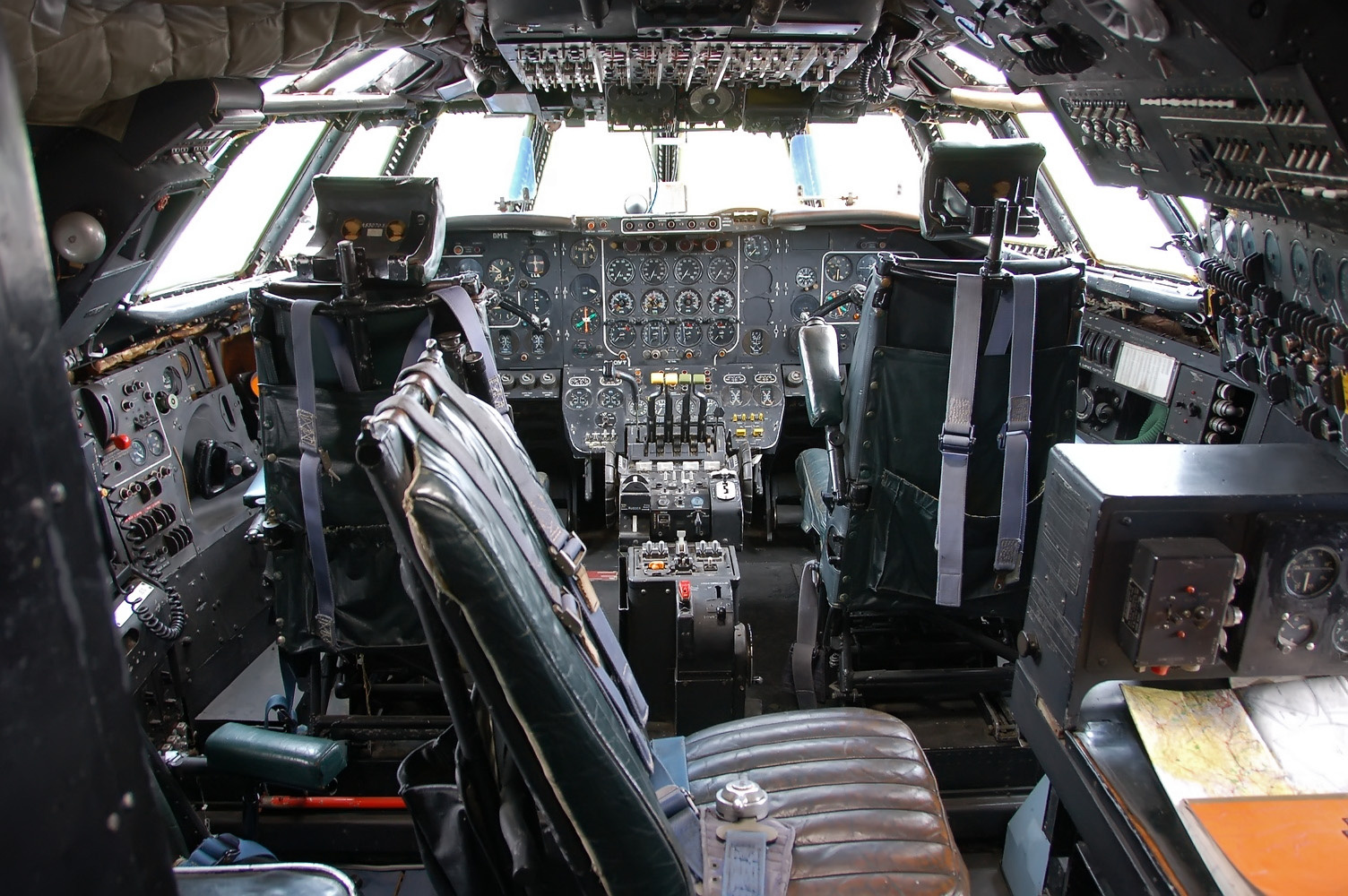
The flight deck of Britannia 312 G-AOVT

Data from Britannia... Last of the Bristol Line

General characteristics

- Crew: 4–7
- Capacity: 139 passengers (coach class)
- Length: 124 ft 3 in (37.87 m)
- Wingspan: 142 ft 3 in (43.36 m)
- Height: 37 ft 6 in (11.43 m)
- Wing area: 2,075 sq ft (192.8 m^{2})
- Airfoil: root: NACA 25017; tip: NACA 4413
- Empty weight: 86,400 lb (39,190 kg)
- Max takeoff weight: 185,000 lb (83,915 kg)
- Powerplant: 4 × Bristol Proteus 765 turboprop engines, 4,450 shp (3,320 kW) each equivalent
- Propellers: 4-bladed

Performance

- Maximum speed: 397 mph (639 km/h, 345 kn)
- Cruise speed: 357 mph (575 km/h, 310 kn) at 22,000 ft (6,700 m)
- Range: 4,430 mi (7,130 km, 3,850 nmi)
- Service ceiling: 24,000 ft (7,300 m)

Avionics

- EKCO E120 weather radar

== See also ==
Related development

- Canadair CP-107 Argus
- Canadair CL-44/Yukon
- Conroy Skymonster

Aircraft of comparable role, configuration, and era

- Antonov An-10
- Ilyushin Il-18
- Lockheed L-188 Electra
- Lockheed L-1249 Super Constellation (R7V-2/YC-121F)
- Vickers Vanguard

Related lists

- List of aircraft of the Royal Air Force
