= Redcoat Air Cargo =

British cargo airline

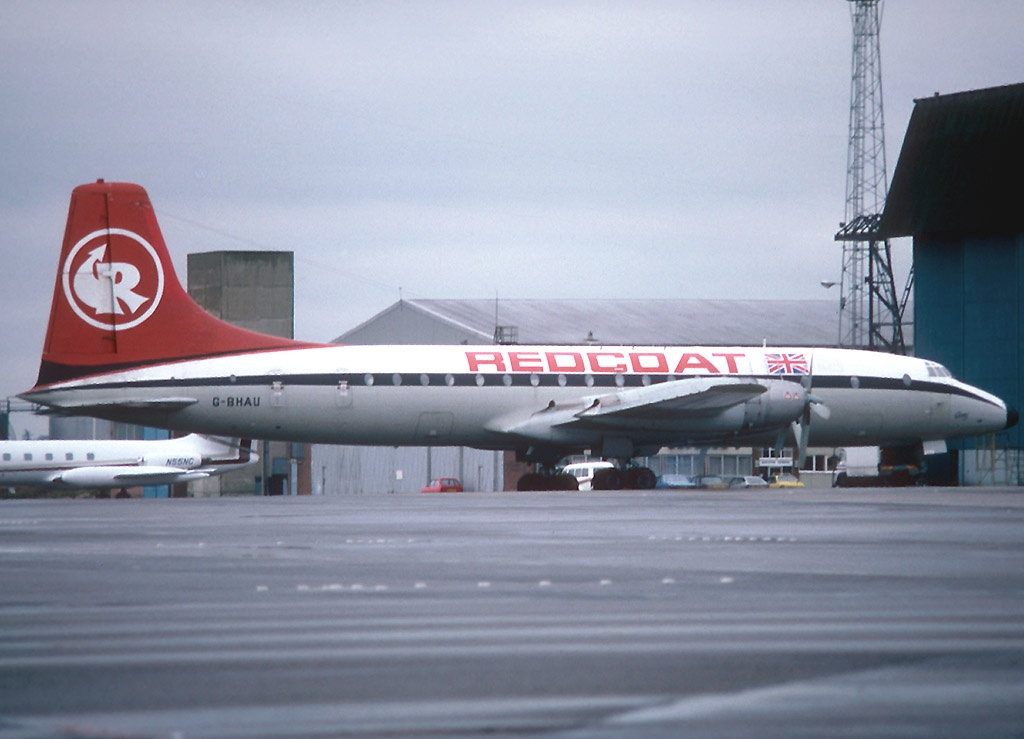
- Bristol B-175 Britannia 253F
IATA	ICAO	Call sign
RY	—	—
- Founded: 1976
- Commenced operations: 27 May 1977
- Ceased operations: 19 May 1982
- Hubs: Luton Airport
- Headquarters: Horley

Redcoat Air Cargo Ltd. was a British cargo airline between 1976 and 1982 with headquarters at Horley in Sussex and an operating base at Luton Airport.

== History ==
Established in 1976, the company started operations on 27 May 1977 using a Bristol Britannia leased from Geminair. It used the aircraft to operate cargo flights from the United Kingdom to West Africa. It later bought its own Britannias, some being ex Royal Air Force Transport Command aircraft (including at least one previously operated by Air Faisal), and by 1979 was also operating freight charters for the Ministry of Defence.

The crash of a Britannia in February 1980 led to the purchase of a Canadair CL-44 from British Cargo Airlines. Delay in acquiring the aircraft from the receiver and subsequent engine problems led to cash flow issues and in spring 1982 the company entered voluntary liquidation.

== Fleet ==
- Bristol Britannia
- Canadair CL-44

== Media ==
In 1980 one of the company's Britannia aircraft (G-AOVS) was used in a BBC television drama series Buccaneer about a fictitious cargo airline.

== Accidents and incidents ==
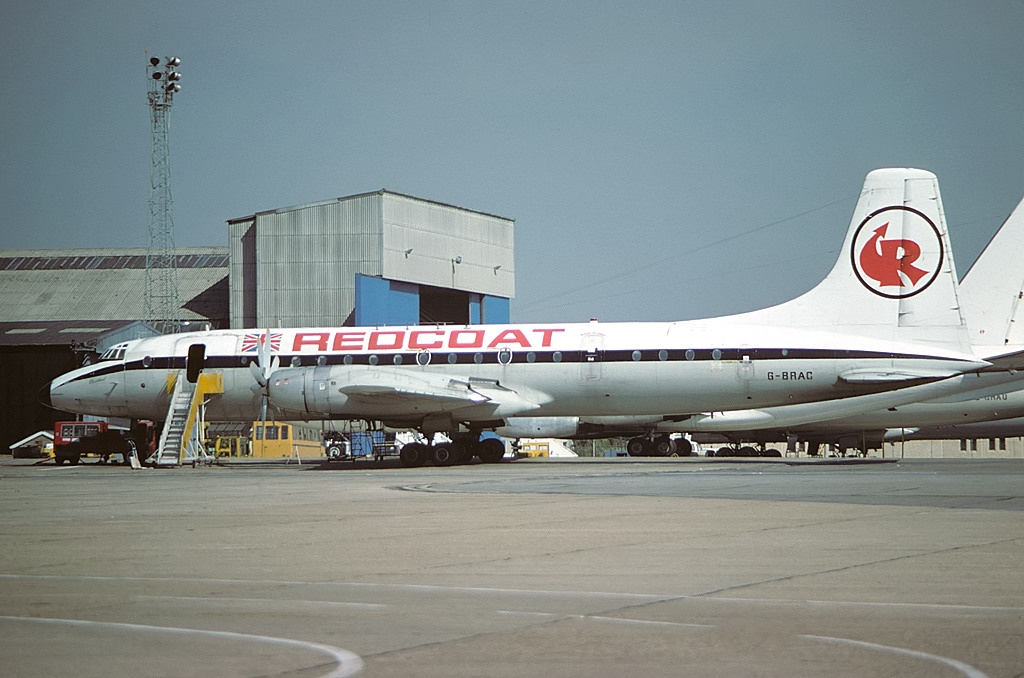
B-175 which crashed in 1980

On 16 February 1980, Redcoat Air Cargo Flight 103, a Bristol Britannia C Mk.1 crashed after departure from Boston-Logan due to ice and snow on the aircraft; seven of the eight occupants died, including the spouse of a serving airman at RAF Belize.

== See also ==
- List of defunct airlines of the United Kingdom
