= Lloyd International Airways =

British independent charter airline

- Founded: 1961
- Commenced operations: 1961
- Ceased operations: 1972
- Hubs: Cambridge Airport (1961–1963); London Gatwick Airport (1964–1966); London Stansted Airport (1967–1972); Berlin Tegel Airport (1966–1968)
- Fleet size: 7 aircraft (as of May 1972) (1 Boeing 707-324C, 2 Boeing 707-321, 4 Bristol Britannia 307/312F
- Destinations: worldwide
- Parent company: Aviation Management (1961–1968); Lloyd International Airways (Holding) (1968–1971); Lloyd Aviation Holdings (1971–1972)
- Headquarters: Central London (1961–1967); London Stansted Airport (1967–1972)
- Key people: J.Ortiz-Patiño, N.F. Mavroleon, C.B.M Lloyd, A.L. MacLeod, J.L. Marden, J.L.M. Crick, P.O. Scales, D.B. Ludbey, K.R. Begg, T.W. Fripp, F. Rossini, T.A. Geekie, M.D. Day, D.L. Willis, Capt. R.P. Wigley

Lloyd International Airways Ltd. was a private, British independent (Note: independent from government-owned corporations) airline formed in 1961 to operate worldwide charter flights. It commenced operations with a single Douglas DC-4 piston airliner from Cambridge Marshall Airport. Lloyd International concentrated on passenger and cargo charters with four-engined, long-range aircraft. It also had links in Hong Kong since its inception and flew to the Far East regularly. During the mid-1960s, the airline began re-equipping its fleet with Bristol Britannia and Canadair CL-44 turboprops, all of which featured large cargo doors and palletised freight systems. Long-range Boeing 707 jets joined the Lloyd International fleet during the early 1970s for use on affinity group passenger and freight charters to North America and the Far East. Lloyd International ceased operations in June 1972.

== History ==
In 1960, Brian Lloyd and Alastair Macleod, two experienced shipping managers and shipbroking partners, joined up with chartered accountant John Louis Mingaye Crick and began formulating plans to take over an existing airline as part of a diversification strategy into the airline business. After months of unsuccessfully trying to raise capital for their planned acquisition, financial backing was finally obtained the following year from Bolivian tin magnate J. Ortiz-Patiño and Greek shipping magnate Nicholas Mavroleon to set up a new airline from scratch. This airline was to specialise in Far East "tramping", concentrating on ships' crews and freight. The founders chose the name Lloyd for their new venture. J. Ortiz-Patiño and Nicholas Mavroleon became the respective chairmen of the airline and of Hong Kong-incorporated Far East Aviation Company Ltd, a group holding company.

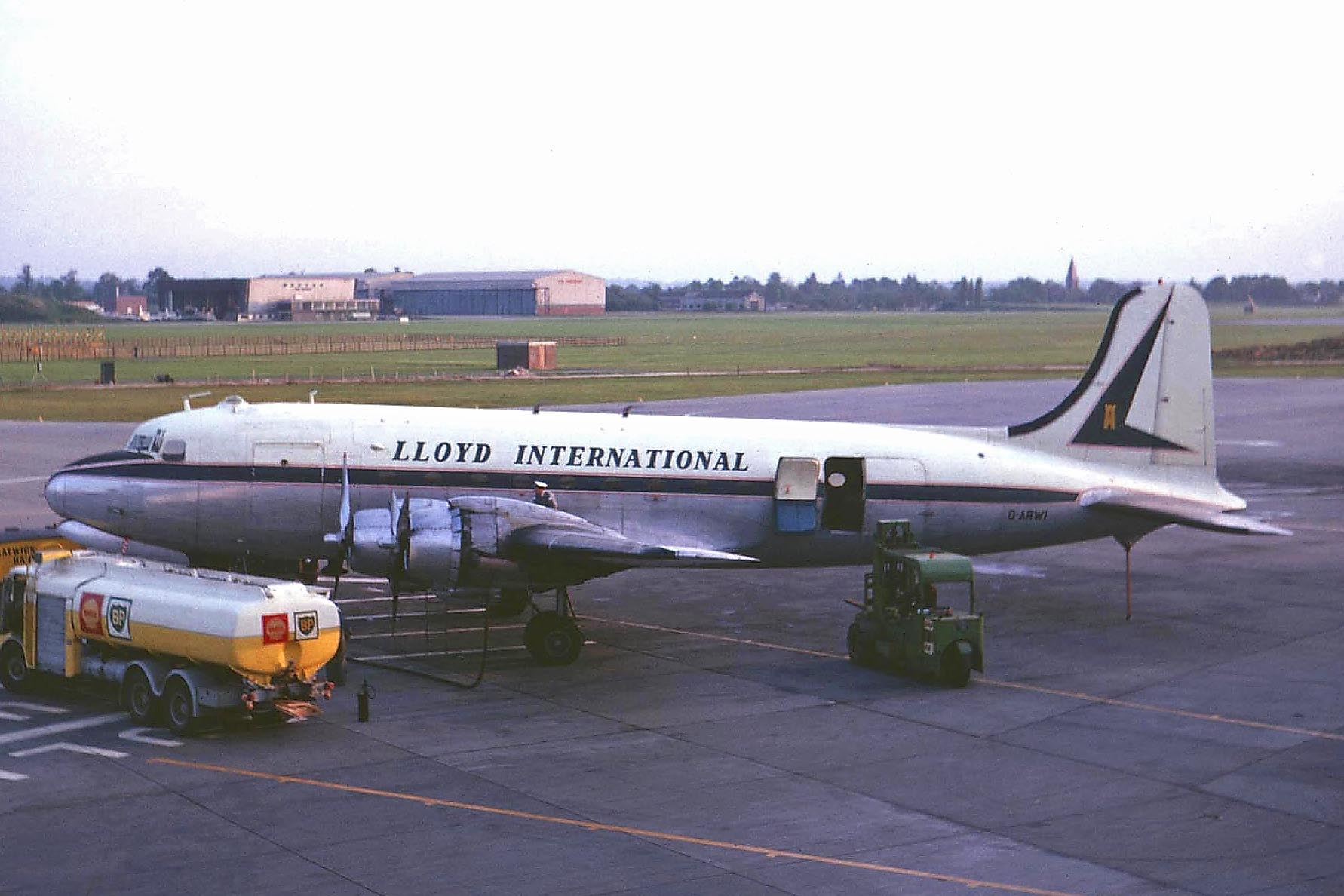
Douglas DC-4 on 14 May 1966

Lloyd International Airways Ltd. was legally incorporated on 18 January 1961 and commenced operations on 3 June of that same year with a second-hand Douglas DC-4. Its first engagement was a series of charter flights carrying ship crews between the United Kingdom and several destinations in the Far East. It soon found other charter work for the aircraft, which led to the acquisition of two more DC-4s in 1962.

Lloyd International's first two years of operations were unprofitable, mainly as a result of uneconomic charter rates caused by excess capacity. Other contributing factors included an expensive emergency lease of a replacement aircraft for a DC-4 destroyed in a refuelling fire and high overheads due to a top-heavy administrative structure.

Budgeting and cost control, introduced in 1963, ensured that charterers were only quoted profitable rates. This resulted in a partial withdrawal from the cut-throat British inclusive tour (IT) market and the opening of an office in Hong Kong to capture a greater share of lucrative Far East cargo traffic.

To ensure every single operation showed a clear profit on a full costing basis, i.e. inclusive of all overhead costs, the company required each operation to be budgeted in detail before deciding whether to accept it. The managing director's authorisation was required to dispense with this rule in exceptional cases where the risk of accepting a contract that was only marginally profitable, i.e. excluding overheads, was outweighed by the risk of having an aircraft sit idly on the ground. An immediate financial analysis that compared actual costs and revenues with their budgets followed the completion of each flight, thereby instantly gauging that flight's profitability and validating the effectiveness of the firm's pricing policy. A policy of requiring aircraft commanders to pay for all operating expenses other than fuel in cash proved to be an effective method to exercise instant cost control over fees and charges incurred for products and services supplied by third parties, such as ground handling fees, technical support services and catering supplies.

In addition, the principle of strict cost control was also applied to aircraft maintenance and flight operations. This entailed outsourcing all engineering work as the fleet was too small to warrant Lloyd International setting up its own maintenance department. It furthermore involved "buying" flying hours at a fixed rate. Moreover, through Wheelock Marden, Lloyd International was indirectly associated with the Hong Kong Aircraft Engineering Company. This enabled it to draw on that company's extensive spares pool in Hong Kong. (Other than Hong Kong, Lloyd International pursued a policy of not stationing any spares along regular routes flown by its aircraft. Instead each aircraft carried its own spares kit — usually consisting of a spare wheel and brake — and a ground engineer.)

In the context of Lloyd International's management's firm belief in exercising tight control over ist costs regarding all aspects of the airline's operations, it is of interest to note that flightdeck crews were instructed to operate their aircraft in high-speed cruise mode despite the resulting higher operating costs due to increased fuel consumption. In an era of low jet fuel prices, this was the most economical option when taking into account the then statutory limit for aircrew to fly up to 115 hours in 28 days, the fact that engineering costs were charged on a flat hourly basis and that there were generally few opportunities to take advantage of differentials in fuel prices at different stations served by the airline.

In 1964, Brian Lloyd, one of the airline's founders, sold out while well-established Far East trading company Wheelock Marden bought into the company by acquiring a 33% stake in the business. The latter transaction put Wheelock Marden's sales offices in Bangkok, Kuala Lumpur, Singapore and Tokyo at the airline's disposal. The same year, Lloyd International acquired its first Douglas DC-6 (an A/B series model), the airline's first pressurised aircraft. This was also the year the airline's operating base moved from Cambridge to Gatwick.

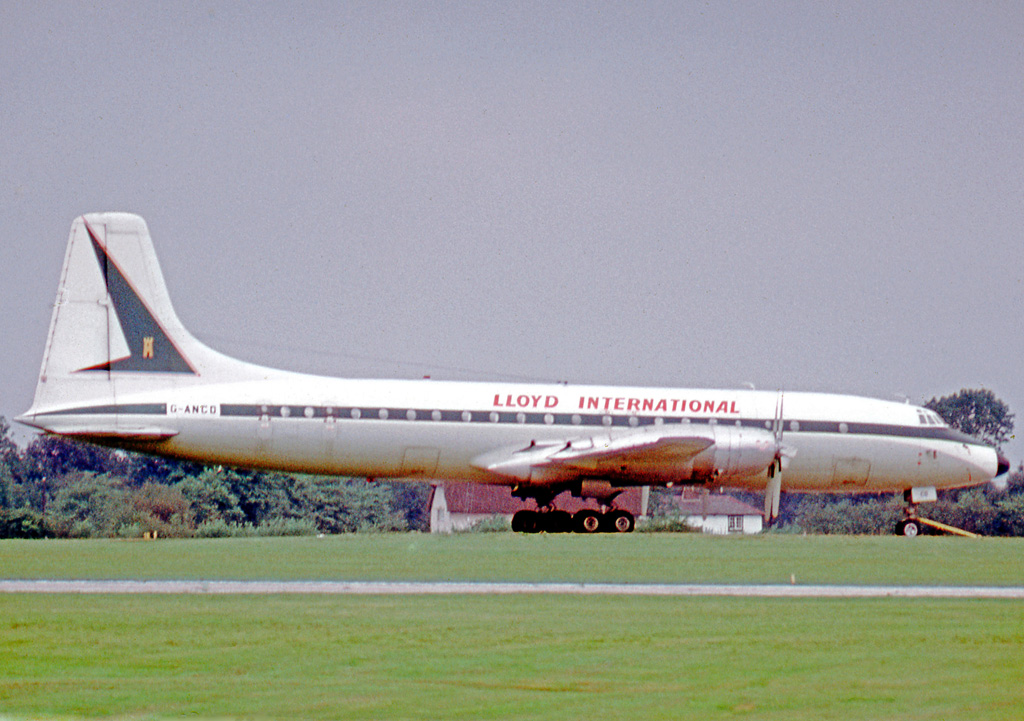
Bristol Britannia 307 convertible passenger/freight turboprop airliner at London Stansted in 1971

In January 1965, Lloyd International decided to acquire two Bristol Britannia 312 turboprops from British Overseas Airways Corporation (BOAC) and to have them fitted with special doors and stronger floors to allow the carriage of large-size palletised freight consignments. The first aircraft joined the fleet in April of that year. Aviation Traders won the contract to convert the Britannias into freighters. This involved fitting the aircraft with large forward cargo doors and strengthening the cabin floors. Conversion began during the 1965/6 winter season. This enabled the company to concentrate on long-haul charters, especially between Europe and the Far East. While these aircraft were primarily intended for freight operations, they were also used to transport passengers.

In 1966, the Hong Kong Air Transport Licensing Authority (ATLA) awarded Lloyd International Airways (Hong Kong) Freighters, an associate company of Lloyd International, a licence to operate twice-weekly all-cargo services between Hong Kong and London. The licence was valid from 1 April 1966, for five years. The same month, the airline sold the DC-6A/B that had been acquired 18 months earlier. Nineteen sixty-six was also the year Neckermann und Reisen, the tour operator of West German mail-order concern Neckermann, contracted Lloyd International to launch a series of weekday IT flights from Tegel Airport in what used to be West Berlin's French sector in the days prior to Germany's reunification. These flights were operated with Britannias. They served principal European holiday resorts in the Mediterranean and the Canary Islands. The combination of these flights with a similar series of weekend IT flights from Scotland on behalf of a British tour operator fully utilised one Britannia for that summer season.

In 1967, Lloyd International shifted its main operating base from Gatwick to Stansted. The latter also became the location of the airline's headquarters, which had been located in Central London since its inception.

In 1968, Lloyd International and its associated companies underwent a reorganisation. This resulted in the creation of Lloyd International Airways (Holding) as the group's holding company with J. Ortiz-Patiño as chairman. Lloyd International Airways (Holding) acquired the entire share capital of Lloyd International Airways, Lloyd Aircraft Services, Brokaloyd and other associated companies. Effectively, this constituted a transfer of shares from Aviation Management, a company based in Hong Kong, to the new British holding company.

In 1969, Lloyd International purchased two former British United Airways (BUA) Britannia 307s. This doubled the size of the airline's Britannia fleet to four aircraft. These aircraft were fully convertible, with large freight doors. They could either be operated as pure freighters, in a mixed passenger/cargo configuration or as all-passenger aircraft seating up to 132 passengers. The addition of these aircraft gave the airline greater flexibility in its core long-distance charter operation, which mainly consisted of ad hoc passenger/seamen and cargo flights between Europe and the Far East, primarily to and from Hong Kong. Lloyd International also developed additional sales and promotional facilities on the Europe — Hong Kong route in association with the Ben Line, a well-known Far Eastern shipping line, to increase air cargo volumes.

Lloyd International's first jet aircraft, an ex-Pan Am Boeing 707-321, entered service in 1970. Lloyd's new long-haul jet operated affinity group flights across the North Atlantic to the United States and Canada as well as passenger and freight charters to the Far East.

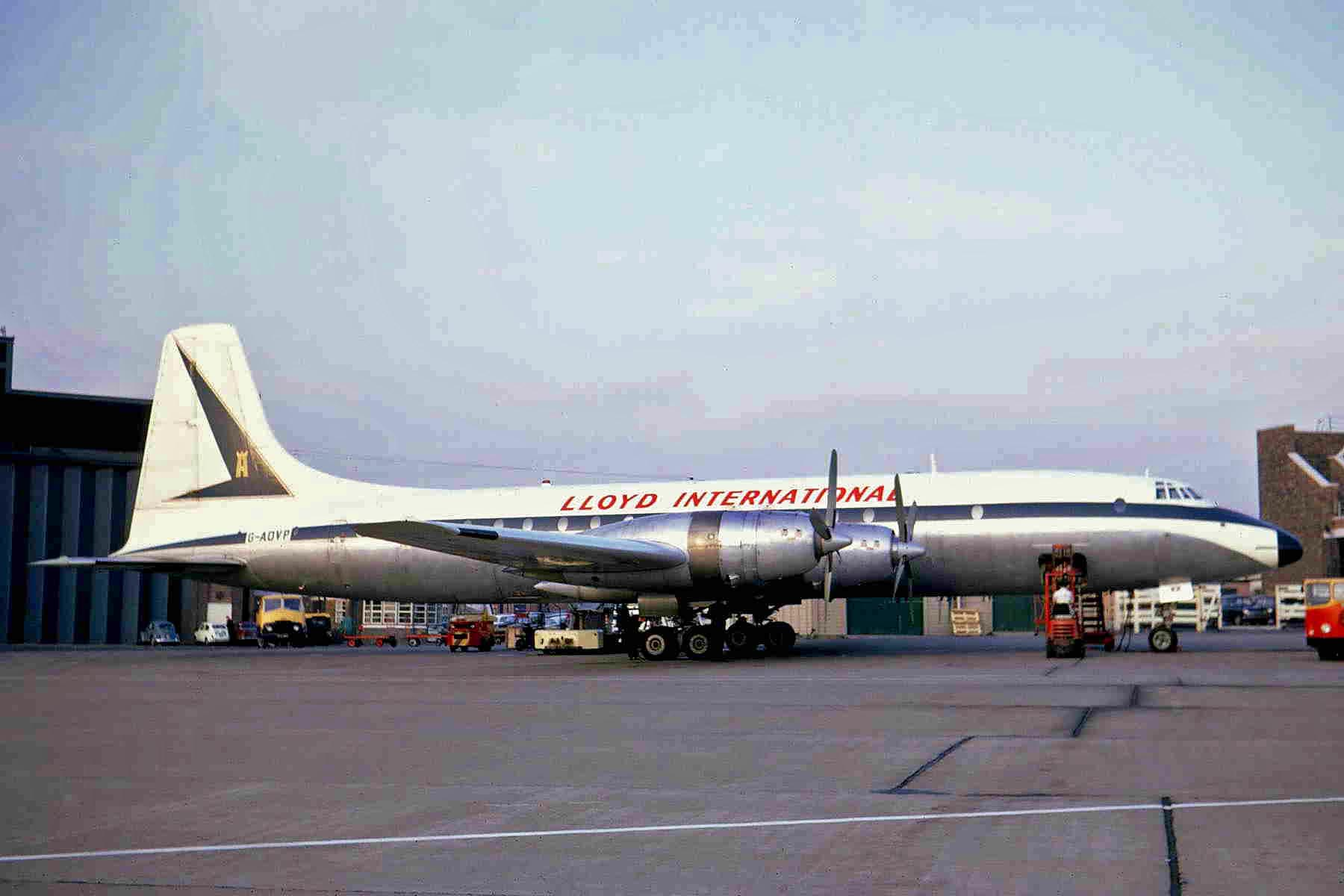
Bristol Britannia B.175 serie 312 on 14 November 1965

In January 1971, Lloyd International entered into an agreement with East African Airways Corporation (EAAC) to operate scheduled all-cargo services on the latter's behalf between London, Dar es Salaam, Nairobi, Entebbe and Lusaka. This was also the year the airline acquired two more 707s, another -321 and a -324C. The latter was a convertible aircraft that could either be operated in an all-passenger, all-cargo or mixed passenger/cargo configuration. It was also the company's first turbofan-powered jet.

In early-1972 Lloyd International increased its Far East Britannia freight services from six to eight a month, resulting in a twice-weekly operation to Singapore and Hong Kong. The increase in flight frequencies would have boosted annual available cargo capacity to 3.25m kg. This compared with an actual freight volume of 1.5m kg the previous year, representing an average load factor of 79% eastbound and 71% westbound. There was also a plan to operate all Far East freight services with an all-jet fleet entirely composed of convertible, turbofan-powered 707-320Cs by 1975.

Lloyd International's rapidly deteriorating financial performance as a result of cancellations and overcapacity in the low-yield transatlantic affinity group market, as well as the Government's refusal to direct the British Airports Authority (BAA) to reduce airport user charges at Stansted and its preferential treatment of British Caledonian by making it the private sector's "chosen instrument" as part of the official "Second Force" policy, compelled it to cease all operations on 16 June 1972 and to go into liquidation.

== Fleet ==
- 3 x Boeing 707 serie 320
- 5 x Bristol Britannia serie 300
- 1 Canadair CL-44 leased
- 4 x Douglas DC-4
- 1 x Douglas DC-6

=== Fleet in 1966 ===
In April 1966 the fleet comprised 5 aircraft.

Aircraft type	Number
Bristol Britannia 312F	2
Douglas DC-6AB	1
Douglas DC-4	2
Total	5

Two Canadair CL-44J (400) were on order. Lloyd International Airways employed 100 people at this time.

=== Fleet in 1972 ===
In May 1972 the fleet comprised 7 aircraft.

Aircraft type	Number
Boeing 707-324C	1
Boeing 707-321	2
Bristol Britannia 307/312F	4
Total	7

Lloyd International Airways employed 260 people at this time.

== Accidents and incidents ==
There is one recorded non-fatal accident involving Lloyd International Airways.

- On 8 October 1961 a Lloyd International Airways Douglas C-54A-1-DC (registration: G-ARLF) burnt out at Málaga Airport following the explosion of a petrol tanker during refuelling. The aircraft had arrived at Málaga from Tanger and was due to depart to Manchester. Although it was destroyed as a result of the explosion, none of the 34 passengers who had arrived on board the ill-fated aircraft and the other 32 who were due to join the flight were injured because they were waiting inside the airport building at the time of the accident. However, those who had started their journey in Tanger lost all their luggage.

== See also ==
- List of defunct airlines of the United Kingdom

== Notes ==
Notes

Citations
