= Redcoat Air Cargo Flight 103 =

Aircraft accident in February 1980 involving ice

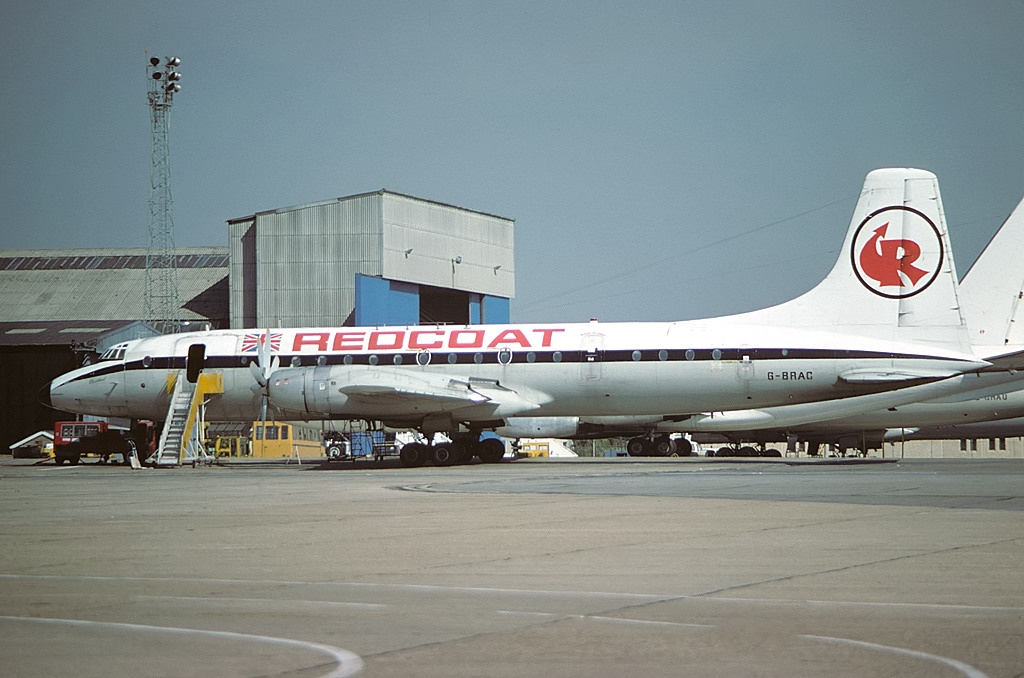
- G-BRAC, the aircraft involved, pictured in 1979

Accident
- Date: 16 February 1980
- Summary: Atmospheric icing leading to stall
- Site: Billerica, Massachusetts; 42°31′45″N 71°15′08″W

Aircraft
- Aircraft type: Bristol Britannia 253F
- Operator: Redcoat Air Cargo
- Registration: G-BRAC
- Flight origin: Boston Logan International Airport, Boston, Massachusetts
- Destination: Shannon Airport, Shannon, Ireland
- Occupants: 8
- Passengers: 2
- Crew: 6
- Fatalities: 7
- Injuries: 1
- Survivors: 1

Redcoat Air Cargo Flight 103 was an international cargo flight by British airline Redcoat Air Cargo from Massachusetts, United States to Shannon, Ireland. On 16 February 1980, the Bristol Britannia lost lift and stalled shortly after take-off. It crashed into a wooded area near Billerica, Massachusetts, leaving only the flight engineer survived of the eight on board.

== Background ==
=== Aircraft ===
The aircraft involved was a Bristol Britannia manufactured in 1959. Before the accident, the plane had accumulated 21,963 flight hours and 8,310 hours.

=== Victims ===
Seven people died in the accident:

- The captain of the flight was George William Coburn, aged 56, having certification for the Bristol Britannia and British Aerospace 125. He had acquired 11,600 flight hours, 7,600 of which were in the Bristol Britannia.
- The first officer of the flight was Jack Kingston Jones, aged 54, who had logged in 7,600 flight hours, 4,760 of which were in the Bristol Britannia.
- The flight engineer of the flight was Richard Alfred Creer, aged 59, who had logged in 20,000 flight hours, 12,000 of which were in the Bristol Britannia. He was the only survivor of the crash.
- The navigator of the flight was Anthony John Beckett, aged 49, who had logged in 14,000 flight hours, 8,000 of which were in the Bristol Britannia.
- The loadmaster was David Esmond Whike.
- The ground engineer was William Brady.
- The two passengers were Lionel Heady and Susan Parker.

== Accident ==
Before the accident, witness found that there was ice built up on the fuselage, wings, horizontal stabiliser, and the engine pipes. The ice was swept off before applying the deicing fluid. The aircraft was still parked for 20-25 minutes before being cleared to taxi at runway 15R. However, it was then changed to runway 33L. Following the traffic conflict, the plane had to hold position. During that time, witness found the accumulation of ice on the control surface.

At 14:08, the aircraft took off from Logan International Airport. As it reached an altitude of 1,700 ft (520 m), it suddenly lost altitude and crashed into a wooded area in Billerica. Only the flight engineer survived with severe injuries. Numerous witnesses found the aircraft falling down in a nose-up configuration, exploded on impact and caught fire.

== Investigation ==
The final report stated that the probable cause of the crash was "Degraded aerodynamic performance, resulting from an accumulation of ice and snow on the airframe before take-off and a further accumulation of ice when the aircraft was flown into moderate to severe icing conditions following take-off."

Contributing were encounters with windshear, downdraughts and turbulence during the climb. The failure of the flight crew to obtain an adequate pre-flight weather briefing and the failure of the National Weather Service to advise the crew of a SIGMET for severe icing conditions were also contributing factors."

== See also ==
- Sol Líneas Aéreas Flight 5428: a crash with almost the same circumstances
