= African Safari Airways =

Kenyan airline

African Safari Air
IATA	ICAO	Call sign
A2	QSC	ZEBRA
- Founded: 1967
- Ceased operations: 2009
- Hubs: Moi International Airport
- Fleet size: 10
- Destinations: 4
- Headquarters: Entebbe, EACU
- Website: http://www.africansafariclub.com/html/flights.php

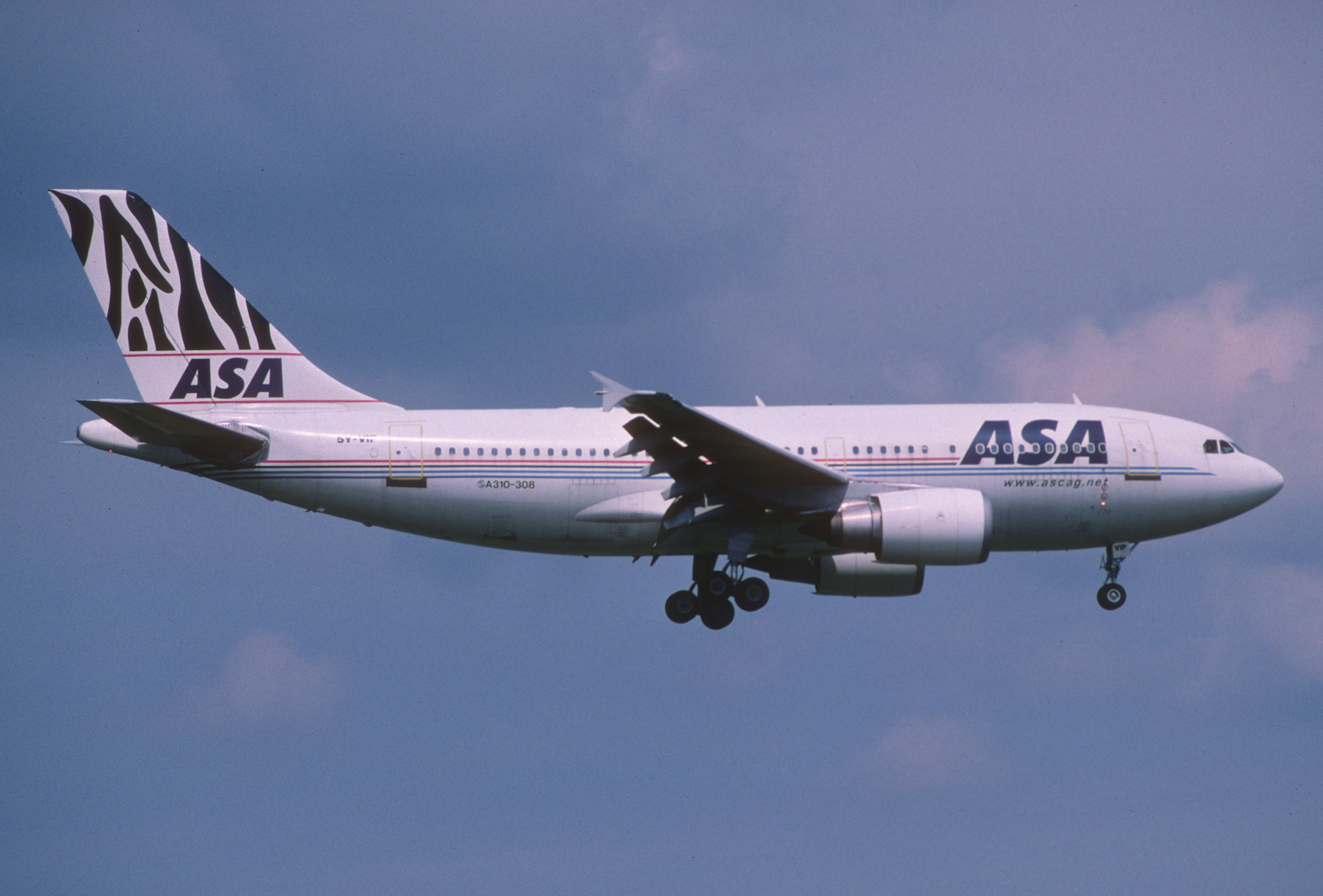
African Safari Airways

African Safari Airways was an airline based in Mombasa, Kenya. It operated charter flights and inclusive tours beginning in 1967 from Europe, mainly to Mombasa. Its main base was Moi International Airport, Mombasa. It ceased operations in 2009.

== History ==
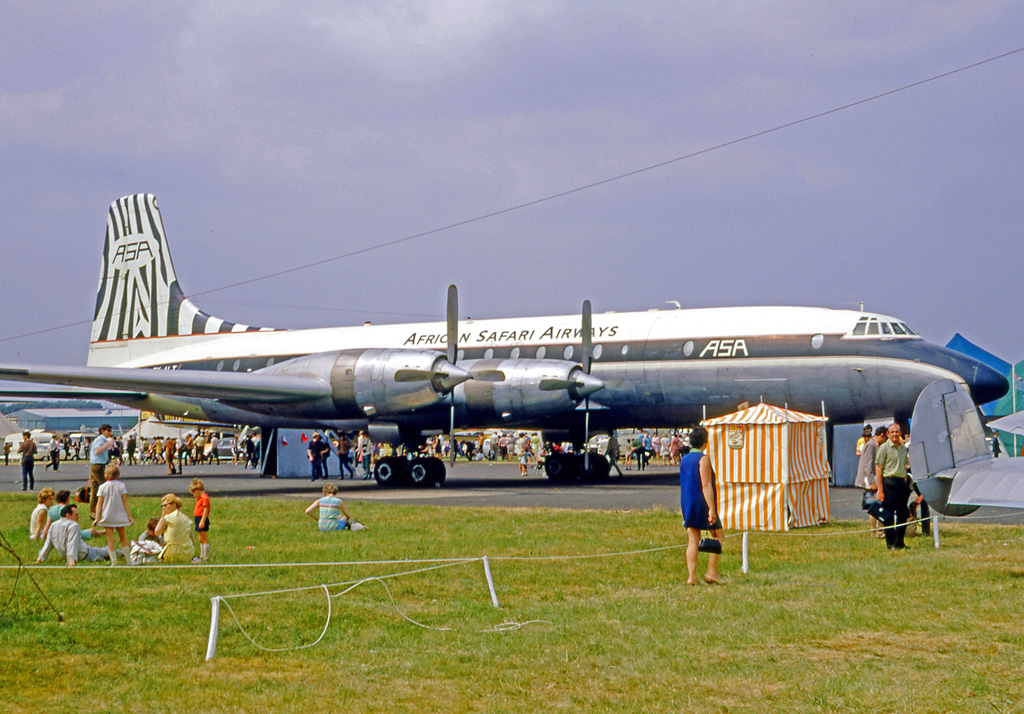
African Safari Bristol Britannia 314 in 1970

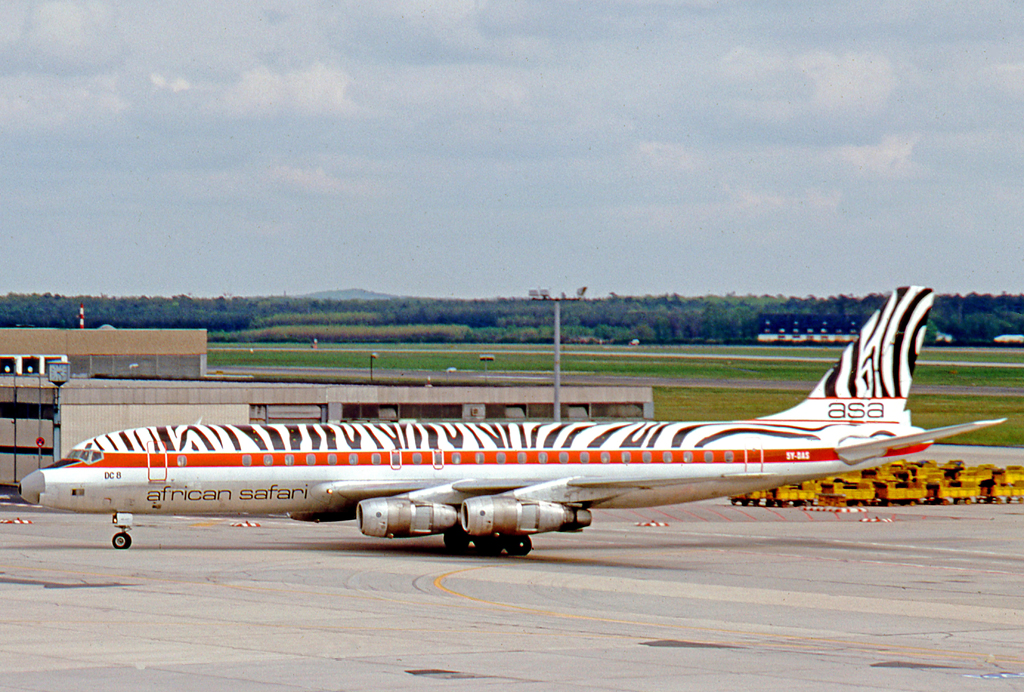
African Safari Douglas DC-8 at Frankfurt Airport in 1977

Founded in 1967, African Safari Airways was part of the African Safari Club Group of companies. The airline operated charter flights from European hub airports including London, Frankfurt, Munich, Basel, Milan, Rome, Madrid, Vienna and Paris to Egypt and Kenya. Initial equipment was provided by Bristol Britannia turboprop airliners from summer 1969 until disposal in 1972. One of these aircraft was leased to Air Faisal.

The airline bought a Douglas DC-8-53 intercontinental airliner from KLM Royal Dutch Airlines in August 1976 and operated the aircraft on its long-distance routes until it was sold in November 1982.

In 1999, the Group, which included a domestic airline in Kenya operating a fleet of 7 aircraft, two cruise ships, 10 hotels, 5 lodges and a vast travel agency network in Europe, faced bankruptcy and engaged Kai Wulff (owner of Plexus Ltd. Consultancy) to manage all its operations and lead a turn-around.

The group re-entered profitability in 2001 and Wulff replaced their aged Douglas DC-10 with an Airbus A310 in a 3-class configuration. After the end of the management term of Wulff in 2004, the company continued to operate as a vertically integrated group until its slow demise which started in 2008 after the post election violence in Kenya.

ASA's domestic daughter company was Skytrails operating 7 planes between 1998 and 2005.

African Safari Airways became Africa Safari Air in 2009. It is based in East Africa. The main hubs are Entebbe and Mombasa. It sometimes connected to Johannesburg in the Republic of South Africa (RSA). The airline has one international connection to North America (Halifax, Canada).

== Fleet ==
As of March 2007 the Africa Safari Air fleet included:

- 1 Airbus A310-308 (5Y-VIP)

== Bibliography ==
- Eastwood, Tony (2004). Jet Airliner Production List - Volume 2. The Aviation Hobby Shop.
- Roach, John (1998). Turbo Prop Airliner Production List. The Aviation Hobby Shop. ISBN 0-907178-69-3.
