= Donaldson International Airways =

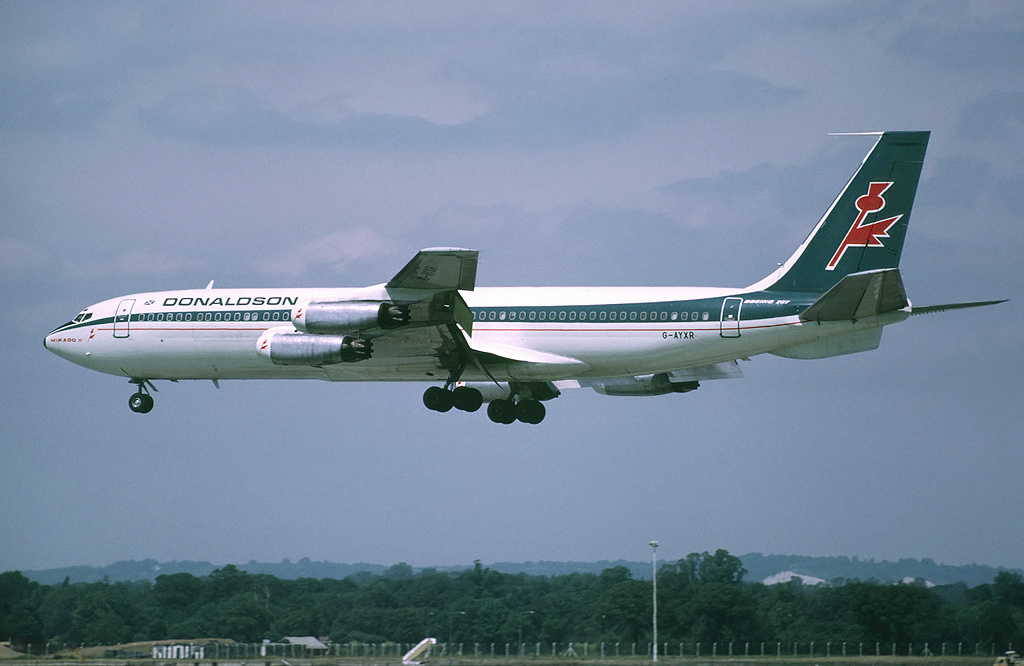
- Boeing 707-321
IATA	ICAO	Call sign
-	DI	DONALDSON
- Founded: 1964
- Commenced operations: 1969
- Ceased operations: 1974
- Fleet size: 8 all together
- Destinations: Europe; North America; Asia

Donaldson International Airways was a British charter airline operative from 1969 to 1974.

== History ==
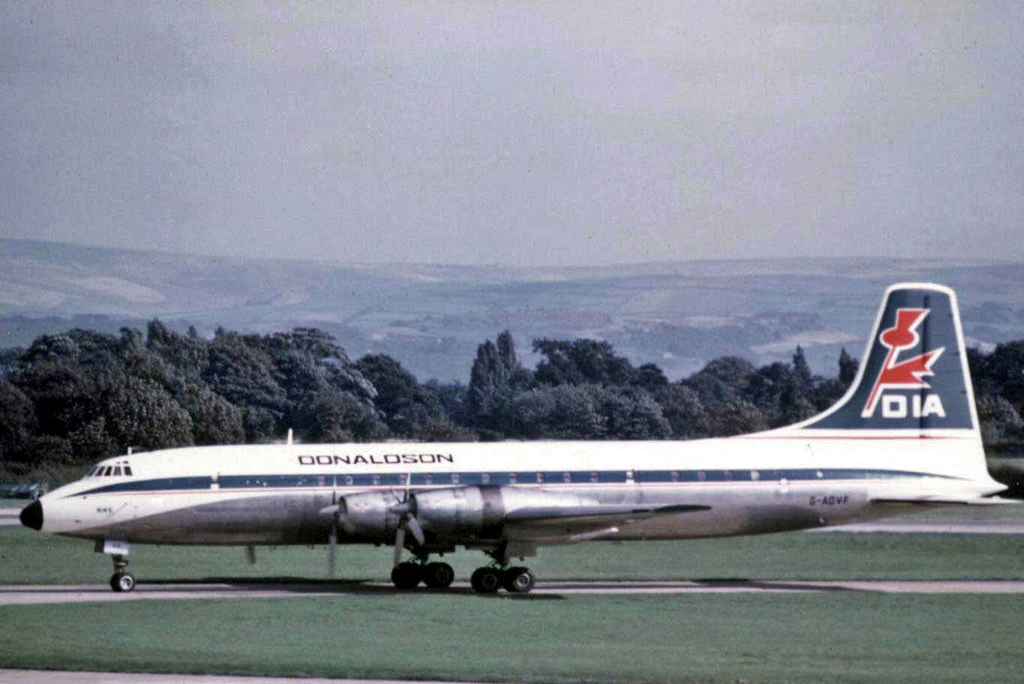
Bristol Britannia 317 at Manchester Airport in 1971

Donaldson International Airways - trading name of Donaldson Line (Air Services) Ltd. - was formed in 1964 to provide inclusive tour and charter flights for Mercury Air Holidays of Glasgow. The airline took delivery of two four-engined Bristol Britannia turboprop aircraft and commenced flights from its bases at London Gatwick Airport and Glasgow Airport in spring 1969. As business expanded the airline acquired another two Britannia aircraft. These aircraft were also operated on charter flights from other major UK Airports including Manchester.

Donaldson Airways started charter flights across the North Atlantic with the delivery of two Boeing 707 aircraft in 1971. Another two 707s were obtained in 1972, and the Britannia aircraft were sold. Three of the 707s were fitted with a cargo door to enable the airline to operate both passenger and freight charters. One Boeing 707 was used in all-cargo configuration during 1973 and 1974.

Donaldson took part in the evacuation of Ugandan refugees during the 1972 expulsion of Asians from Uganda in October 1972, flying a Boeing 707 to London Gatwick Airport as well as to London Stansted Airport. In May 1974 the airline operated services for Iraqi Airways, but all flying ceased on 8 August 1974 and the Boeing 707s were repossessed by Pan American World Airways.

== Fleet ==
- 3 x Boeing 707-321
- 2 x Bristol Britannia 312F
- 2 x Bristol Britannia 317

== See also ==
- List of defunct airlines of the United Kingdom
