= List of airline codes (B) =

This is a list of all airline codes. The table lists the IATA airline designators, the ICAO airline designators and the airline call signs (telephony designator). Historical assignments are also included for completeness.

== Codes ==
Airline codes
IATA	ICAO	Airline	Call sign	Country	Comments
	BBF	B-Air Charter	SPEEDCHARTER	Germany	2014
CJ	CFE	BA CityFlyer	FLYER	United Kingdom	
TH	BRT	BA Connect	BRITISH	United Kingdom	defunct
	EFW	BA Euroflyer	GRIFFIN	United Kingdom	British Airways subsidiary based at London Gatwick
	BAC	BAC Leasing Limited		United Kingdom	
B4	BCF	BACH Flugbetriebsges	BACH	Austria	
	BOB	Backbone A/S	BACKBONE	Denmark	
J4	BDR	Badr Airlines	BADR AIR	Sudan	
	BAE	BAE Systems	FELIX	United Kingdom	Corporate Air Travel
UP	BHS	Bahamasair	BAHAMAS	Bahamas	
	BAB	Bahrain Air BSC (Closed)	AWAL	Bahrain	
	BFW	Bahrain Defence Force	SUMMAN	Bahrain	
	BXA	Bahrain Executive Air Services	BEXAIR	Bahrain	
	BJA	Baja Air	BAJA AIR	Mexico	
8Q*	BAJ	Baker Aviation	RODEO	United States	
	OGJ	Bakoji Airlines Services	BAKO AIR	Nigeria	
V9	BTC	BAL Bashkirian Airlines	BASHKIRIAN	Russia	
	BEF	Balear Express	BALEAR EXPRESS	Spain	
	BLN	Bali International Air Service	BIAR	Indonesia	
	BAA	Balkan Agro Aviation	BALKAN AGRO	Bulgaria	
LZ	LAZ	Balkan Bulgarian Airlines	BALKAN	Bulgaria	defunct
	BHI	Balkh Airlines	SHARIF	Afghanistan	
	PNT	Balmoral Central Contracts	PORTNET	South Africa	
BQ	BTL	Baltia Air Lines	BALTIA	United States	Callsign changed from "BALTIA FLIGHT" in 2015
	BLL	Baltic Airlines	BALTIC AIRLINES	Russia	
	BLT	Baltic Aviation	BALTAIR	United States	
	BJC	Baltic Jet Aircompany	BALTIC JET	Latvia	
	BTH	Baltijas Helicopters	BALTIJAS HELICOPTERS	Latvia	
	CPJ	Baltimore Air Transport	CORPJET	United States	
	EAH	Baltimore Airways	EASTERN	United States	
	BTK	Baltyka	BALTYKA	Ukraine	
QH	BAV	Bamboo Airways	BAMBOO	Vietnam	
QO	AJC	Bar Harbor Airlines	BAR HARBOR	United States	
		BAX Global			
	AUJ	Business Flight Salzburg	AUSTROJET	Austria	
	CWR	Beijing City International Jet	CITY WORLD	China	
	BJV	Beijing Vistajet Aviation	BEIJING VISTA	China	
	BHK	Blu Halkin	BLUEHAKIN	United Kingdom	
	BXJ	Brixtel Group	BRIXTEL JET	United States	
	BYG	Bygone Aviation	BYGONE	United States	
	BBJ	Blue Air Lines	BLUE KOREA	South Korea	
	BCJ	Blue Jet Charters	BLUE BOY	Poland	
	BNA	Bun Air Corporation	BUN AIR	United States	
B3	BTN	Bhutan Airlines	BHUTAN AIR	Bhutan	
	BAF	Belgian Air Force	BELGIAN AIRFORCE	Belgium	
	BAK	Blackhawk Airways	BLACKHAWK	United States	
L9	BAL	Belle Air Europe	BELLEAIR EUROPE	Italy	Previously Britannia Airways
	BAL	Britannia Airways	BRITANNIA	United Kingdom	Defunct
	BAM	Business Air Services	BUSINESS AIR	Canada	
	BAN	British Antarctic Survey	PENGUIN	United Kingdom	
	BAR	Bradly Air (Charter) Services	BRADLEY	Canada	
	BAU	Bissau Airlines	AIR BISSAU	Guinea-Bissau	
	BAV	Bay Aviation Ltd	BAY AIR	Bangladesh	
BA	BAW	British Airways	SPEEDBIRD	United Kingdom	
	BAX	Best Aero Handling Ltd		Russia	
	BAY	Bravo Airways	BRAVOAVIANCA	Ukraine	
	BBA	Bannert Air	BANAIR	Austria	
BG	BBC	Biman Bangladesh Airlines	BANGLADESH	Bangladesh	
BO	BBD	Bluebird Nordic	BLUE CARGO	Iceland	
	BBS	Beibars CJSC	BEIBARS	Kazakhstan	
	BBV	Bravo Airlines	BRAVO EUROPE	Spain	
BO	BBW	BB Airways	BEEBEE AIRWAYS	Nepal	
	BBZ	Bluebird Aviation	COBRA	Kenya	
SI	BCI	Blue Islands	BLUE ISLAND	United Kingdom	
EO	BCL	British Caribbean Airways		United Kingdom	defunct
	BCR	British Charter	BACKER	United Kingdom	
	BCT	BCT Aviation	BOBCAT	United Kingdom	
	BCV	Business Aviation Center	BUSINESS AVIATION	Ukraine	
WX	BCY	CityJet	CITY JET	Ireland	
BZ	BDA	Blue Dart Aviation	BLUE DART	India	
JA	BON	B&H Airlines	Air Bosna	Bosnia and Herzegovina	
	BDF	Bissau Discovery Flying Club	BISSAU DISCOVERY	Guinea-Bissau	
	AYB	Belgian Army	BELGIAN ARMY	Belgium	
	BEA	Best Aviation Ltd	BEST AIR	Bangladesh	
	BED	Belgorod Air Enterprise	BELOGORYE	Russia	defunct
	BEH	Bel Air Helicopters	BLUECOPTER	Denmark	
	BEK	Berkut Air	BERKUT	Kazakhstan	
	BET	BETA - Brazilian Express Transportes Aéreos	BETA CARGO	Brazil	
	BFC	Basler Flight Service	BASLER	United States	
	BFG	Bear Flight	BEARFLIGHT	Sweden	
J4	BFL	Buffalo Airways	BUFFALO	Canada	
	BFO	Bombardier	BOMBARDIER	Canada	
	BFR	Burkina Airlines	BURKLINES	Burkina Faso	
	BFS	Business Flight Sweden	BUSINESS FLIGHT	Sweden	
8H	BGH	BH Air	BALKAN HOLIDAYS	Bulgaria	
	BGI	British Gulf International	BRITISH GULF	São Tomé and Príncipe	
	BGK	British Gulf International-Fez	GULF INTER	Kyrgyzstan	
A8	BGL	Benin Golf Air	BENIN GOLF	Benin	
	BGM	Bugulma Air Enterprise	BUGAVIA	Russia	
	BGR	Budget Air Bangladesh	BUDGET AIR	Bangladesh	
	BGT	Bergen Air Transport	BERGEN AIR	Norway	
U4	BHA	Buddha Air	BUDDHA AIR	Nepal	
UH	BHL	Bristow Helicopters	BRISTOW	United Kingdom	
	BHN	Bristow Helicopters Nigeria	BRISTOW HELICOPTERS	Nigeria	
	BHO	Bhoja Airlines	BHOJA	Pakistan	
4T	BHP	Belair Airlines	BELAIR	Switzerland	
	BHR	Bighorn Airways	BIGHORN AIR	United States	
	BHT	Bright Air	BRIGHTAIR	Netherlands	ICAO code and call sign no longer allocated
E6		Bringer Air Cargo Taxi Aéreo		Brazil	
	BHY	Bosphorus European Airways	BOSPHORUS	Turkey	
	BID	Binair	BINAIR	Germany	
	BIG	Big Island Air	BIG ISLE	United States	
BS	BIH	British International Helicopters	BRINTEL	United Kingdom	
	BIL	Billund Air Center	BILAIR	Denmark	
	BIN	Boise Interagency Fire Center	BISON-AIR	United States	
	BIO	Bioflight A/S	BIOFLIGHT	Denmark	
	BIR	Bird Leasing	BIRD AIR	United States	
	BIZ	Bizjet Ltd	BIZZ	United Kingdom	
	BJS	Business Jet Solutions	SOLUTION	United States	
B4	BKA	Bankair	BANKAIR	United States	
	BKF	BF-Lento OY	BAKERFLIGHT	Finland	
	BKK	Blink	BLINKAIR	United Kingdom	
	BKJ	Barken International	BARKEN JET	United States	
PG	BKP	Bangkok Airways	BANGKOK AIR	Thailand	
	BKV	Bukovyna	BUKOVYNA	Ukraine	
	BLB	Blue Bird Aviation	BLUEBIRD SUDAN	Sudan	
	BLC	Bellesavia	BELLESAVIA	Belarus	
	BLE	Blue Line	BLUE BERRY	France	
KF	BLF	Blue1	BLUEFIN	Finland	
	BLG	Belgavia	BELGAVIA	Belgium	
	BLH	Blue Horizon Travel Club	BLUE HORIZON	United States	
	BLJ	Blue Jet	BLUEWAY	Spain	
	BLM	Blue Sky Airlines	BLUE ARMENIA	Armenia	defunct
JV	BLS	Bearskin Lake Air Service	BEARSKIN	Canada	
B3	BLV	Bellview Airlines	BELLVIEW AIRLINES	Nigeria	
BD	BMA	BMI	MIDLAND	United Kingdom	defunct
2T	BMA	BermudAir	GOSLING	Bermuda	
BM	BMR	BMI Regional	MIDLAND	United Kingdom	
	BMD	British Medical Charter	BRITISH MEDICAL	United Kingdom	
	BME	Briggs Marine Environmental Services	BRIGGS	United Kingdom	
	BMH	Bristow Masayu Helicopters	MASAYU	Indonesia	
WW	BMI	Bmibaby	BABY	United Kingdom	defunct
CH	BMJ	Bemidji Airlines	BEMIDJI	United States	
5Z	BML	Bismillah Airlines	BISMILLAH	Bangladesh	IATA code in use by another company
	BMN	Bowman Aviation	BOWMAN	United States	
	BMW	BMW	BMW-FLIGHT	Germany	
	BMX	Banco de Mexico	BANXICO	Mexico	
	BND	Bond Offshore Helicopters	BOND	United Kingdom	
	BNE	Benina Air	BENINA AIR	Libya	
BN	BNF	Braniff International Airways	Braniff	United States	defunct
	BNG	BN Group Limited	VECTIS	United Kingdom	
	BNJ	Air Service Liège (ASL)	JET BELGIUM	Belgium	
	BNL	Blue Nile Ethiopia Trading	NILE TRADING	Ethiopia	
	BNR	Bonair Aviation	BONAIR	Canada	
	BNS	Bancstar - Valley National Corporation	BANCSTAR	United States	
	BNT	Bentiu Air Transport	BENTIU AIR	Sudan	
	BNV	Benane Aviation Corporation	BENANE	Mauritania	
	BNW	British North West Airlines	BRITISH NORTH	United Kingdom	
	BOD	Bond Air Services	UGABOND	Uganda	
	BOA	Boniair	KUMANOVO	North Macedonia	
AB	BNZ	Bonza	BONZA	Australia	Defunct
	BOE	Boeing	BOEING	United States	
	BOF	Bordaire	BORDAIR	Canada	
	BOO	Bookajet Limited	BOOKAJET	United Kingdom	
BO	BOU	Bouraq Indonesia Airlines	BOURAQ	Indonesia	
BV	BPA	Blue Panorama Airlines	BLUE PANORAMA	Italy	
	BPK	Berkhut ZK	VENERA	Kazakhstan	
	BPO	Bundespolizei-Fliegertruppe	PIROL	Germany	
	BPS	Budapest Aircraft Services/Manx2	BASE	Hungary	
	BPT	Bonus Aviation	BONUS	United Kingdom	
	BPX	British Petroleum Exploration		Colombia	
7R	BRB	BRA-Transportes Aéreos	BRA-TRANSPAEREOS	Brazil	
	BRD	Brock Air Services	BROCK AIR	Canada	
	BRE	Breeze Ltd	AVIABREEZE	Ukraine	
8E	BRG	Bering Air	BERING AIR	United States	
	BRK	Briansk State Air Enterprise	BRIANSK-AVIA	Russia	
	BRN	Branson Airlines	BRANSON	United States	
	BRO	BASE Regional Airlines	COASTRIDER	Netherlands	ICAO code in use by another company, call sign no longer allocated
	BRS	Brazilian Air Force	BRAZILIAN AIR FORCE	Brazil	
TH	BRT	British Regional Airlines	BRITISH	United Kingdom	defunct
B2	BRU	Belavia Belarusian Airlines	BELARUS AVIA	Belarus	
	BRV	Bravo Air Congo	BRAVO	Democratic Republic of the Congo	defunct
	BRW	Bright Aviation Services	BRIGHT SERVICES	Bulgaria	
	BRX	Buffalo Express Airlines	BUFF EXPRESS	United States	
	BRY	Burundayavia	BURAIR	Kazakhstan	
	BSC	Bistair - Fez	BIG SHOT	Kyrgyzstan	
	BSD	Blue Star Airlines	AIRLINES STAR	Mexico	
	BSI	Brasair Transportes Aéreos	BRASAIR	Brazil	
	BSJ	Blue Swan Aviation	BLUE SWAN	United Kingdom	ICAO Code and callsign (BSJ/BLUE SWAN) withdrawn
	BSM	Blue Sky Aviation		Lebanon	
	BSS	Bissau Aero Transporte	BISSAU AIRSYSTEM	Guinea-Bissau	
	BST	Best Air	TUNCA	Turkey	
	BSW	Blue Sky Airways	SKY BLUE	Czech Republic	
GQ	BSY	Big Sky Airlines	BIG SKY	United States	
	BTI	Air Baltic	Air Baltic	Latvia	
ID	BTK	Batik Air	BATIK	Indonesia	
4B	BTQ	Boutique Air	BOUTIQUE	United States	
	BTR	Botir-Avia	BOTIR-AVIA	Kyrgyzstan	
	BTT	BT-Slavuta	BEETEE-SLAVUTA	Ukraine	
Y6	BTV	Batavia Air	BATAVIA	Indonesia	As of June 1, 2010, IATA code changed to Y6.
L9	BTZ	Bristow U.S. LLC	BRISTOW	United States	
H6	BUC	European Air Charter	EUROCHARTER	Bulgaria	previously Bulgarian Air Charter
	BUL	Blue Airlines	BLUE AIRLINES	Democratic Republic of the Congo	
BU	BUN	Buryat Airlines Aircompany	BURAL	Russia	
	BUZ	Buzz Stansted	BUZZ	United Kingdom	
	BVA	Buffalo Airways	BUFFALO AIR	United States	
	BVC	Bulgarian Aeronautical Centre	BULGARIAN WINGS	Bulgaria	
	BVN	Baron Aviation Services	SHOW-ME	United States	
J8	BVT	Berjaya Air	BERJAYA	Malaysia	
B3	BVU	Bellview Airlines, Sierra Leone	BELLVIEW AIRLINES	Sierra Leone	
	BWD	Bluewest Helicopters-Greenland	BLUEWEST	Denmark	
QW	BWG	Blue Wings	BLUE WINGS	Germany	defunct
	BWI	Blue Wing Airlines	BLUE TAIL	Suriname	
	BWL	British World Airlines	BRITWORLD	United Kingdom	
	BXH	Bar XH Air	PALLISER	Canada	
SN	BXI	Brussels Airlines	XENIA	Belgium	defunct as Brussels International Airlines in 2001
	BYA	Berry Aviation	BERRY	United States	
	BYC	Cambodia Bayon Airlines	Bayon Air	Cambodia	
	BYF	San Carlos Flight Center	BAY FLIGHT	United States	
	BYL	Bylina Joint-Stock Company	BYLINA	Russia	
	BYR	Berytos Airlines		Lebanon	
	BYE	Bayu Indonesia Air	BAYU	Indonesia	
	BZA	Bizair Fluggesellschaft	BERLIN BEAR	Germany	
DB	BZH	Brit Air	BRITAIR	France	
	BZZ	Butane Buzzard Aviation Corporation	BUZZARD	United Kingdom	
JD	CBJ	Beijing Capital Airlines	CAPITAL JET	China	
	CKM	BKS Air (Rivaflecha)	COSMOS	Spain	
	CLF	Bristol Flying Centre	CLIFTON	United Kingdom	
	CLN	Barnes Olsen Aeroleasing	SEELINE	United Kingdom	
E9	CXS	Boston-Maine Airways	CLIPPER CONNECTION	United States	Pan Am Clipper Connection Pan Am III
SN	BEL	Brussels Airlines	BEE-LINE	Belgium	
	EBA	Bond Aviation	BOND AVIATION	Italy	
	EXB	Brazilian Army Aviation	BRAZILIAN ARMY	Brazil	
	EXP	Business Express Delivery	EXPRESS AIR	Canada	
	FOS	Bel Limited		Russia	
	GAA	Business Express	BIZEX	United States	
	HAW	Bangkok Aviation Center	THAI HAWK	Thailand	
	HAX	Benair	SCOOP	Norway	
NT	IBB	Binter Canarias	BINTER	Spain	
	IRJ	Bonyad Airlines	BONYAD AIR	Iran	
	IVR	Burundaiavia	RERUN	Kazakhstan	
0B	BLA	Blue Air	BLUE AIR	Romania	
KJ	LAJ	British Mediterranean Airways	BEE MED	United Kingdom	defunct
	LBY	Belle Air	ALBAN-BELLE	Albania	
	LED	Blom Geomatics	SWEEPER	Norway	
	LTL	Benin Littoral Airways	LITTORAL	Benin	
	LXJ	Bombardier Business Jet Solutions	FLEXJET	United States	
FB	LZB	Bulgaria Air	FLYING BULGARIA	Bulgaria	
	MBR	Brazilian Navy Aviation	BRAZILIAN NAVY	Brazil	
8N	NKF	Barents AirLink	NORDFLIGHT	Sweden	previously Nordkalottflyg
	NYB	Belgian Navy	BELGIAN NAVY	Belgium	
	OTA	Business Aviators	OUTLAW	United States	2014
	OUF	Beijing Eofa International Jet	ELEMENT	China	2014
	PEB	Benders Air	PALEMA	Sweden	
	POI	BGB Air	BOJBAN	Kazakhstan	
	PPS	Butte Aviation	PIPESTONE	United States	
	PVO	Bearing Supplies Limited	PROVOST	United Kingdom	
	RHD	Bond Air Services	RED HEAD	United Kingdom	
	RLR	Business Airfreight	RATTLER	United States	
	RRS	Boscombe Down DERA (Formation)	BLACKBOX	United Kingdom	
	SCJ	Business Jet Sweden	SCANJET	Sweden	
	SHT	British Airways Shuttle	SHUTTLE	United Kingdom	BA domestic services
	SKH	British Sky Broadcasting	SKYNEWS	United Kingdom	
	TBL	Bell Aliant Regional Communications	TELCO	Canada	
	TXB	Bell Helicopter Textron	TEXTRON	Canada	
	UKA	Buzzaway Limited	UKAY	United Kingdom	
	VLX	Biz Jet Charter	AVOLAR	United States	
	VOL	Blue Chip Jet	BLUE SPEED	Sweden	
	WFD	BAE Systems	AVRO	United Kingdom	Woodford Flight Test
	WTN	BAE Systems	TARNISH	United Kingdom	Warton Military Flight Ops
	XBO	Baseops International		United States	
	XDA	Bureau Veritas		France	
	XMS	British Airways Santa	SANTA	United Kingdom	Christmas charter flights
	ZBA	Boskovic Air Charters Limited	BOSKY	Kenya	
	JMP	Businesswings	JUMP RUN	Germany	
OB	BOV	Boliviana de Aviación	BOLIVIANA	Bolivia	
YB	BRJ	Borajet	BORA JET	Turkey	
MX	MXY	Breeze Airways	MOXY	United States	

== IATA Traffic Conference Areas ==
The International Air Transport Association (IATA) divides the world into three areas called the Traffic Conference Areas (TCAs) for air travel purposes. These areas are used to define geographical boundaries for fare construction and other industry-related practices:

- Traffic Conference Area 1 (TC1) – this area includes the Americas, encompassing North America (the Caribbean, Central America, and Northern America) and South America.
- Traffic Conference Area 2 (TC2) – this area includes the EMEA region, encompassing Europe, the Middle East, and Africa (North Africa and Sub-Saharan Africa).
- Traffic Conference Area 3 (TC3) – this area includes the Asia–Pacific region, encompassing the rest of Asia (Central Asia, East Asia, North Asia, South Asia, and Southeast Asia) and Oceania.

Essentially, TC1 covers the "New World", while TC2 and TC3 together cover the "Old World" (Africa-Eurasia) and the "Land Down Under".

== See also ==
- IATA airport code
- ICAO airport code
