= BXJ =

BXJ may refer to:

- BXJ instruction, an instruction used in Jazelle to branch to Java
- BXJ Technologies, a fictional organization in the television series 24
- BXJ, IATA code for Boraldai Airport in Almaty city, Kazakhstan
- BXJ, ICAO code for Brixtel Group, an American company
