= British midland =

British midland may refer to:

- British Midland Airways Limited, also referred to as bmi and formerly as British Midland
- The English Midlands, the central region of Great Britain
