= 1961 Derby Aviation crash =

Aviation incident in France

1961 Derby Aviation Dakota crash
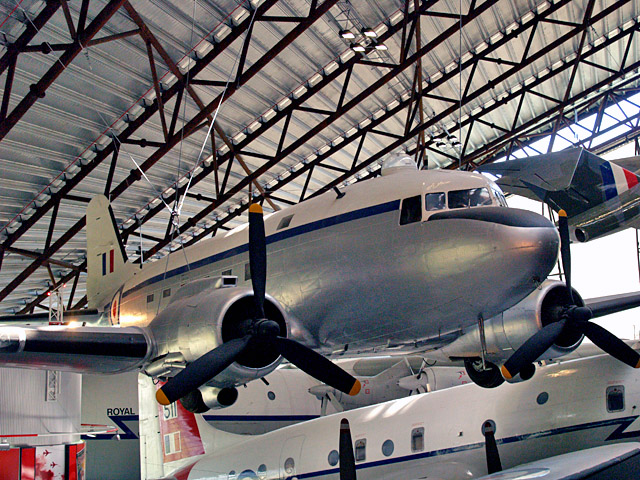
- A Dakota IV similar to the accident aircraft at the National Cold War Museum Cosford

Accident
- Date: 7 October 1961
- Summary: Navigational error CFIT
- Site: Pic de Canigó; 42.5189°N 2.4567°E

Aircraft
- Aircraft type: Douglas Dakota IV
- Operator: Derby Aviation
- Registration: G-AMSW
- Occupants: 34
- Passengers: 31
- Crew: 3
- Fatalities: 34
- Survivors: 0

The 1961 Derby Aviation crash refers to the fatal crash of a Douglas Dakota IV, registration G-AMSW, operated by Derby Aviation, the forerunner of British Midland Airways, on the mountain of Canigó, France, on 7 October 1961. All 34 on board (31 passengers, pilot, co-pilot and stewardess) were killed.

== History of the flight ==
The flight left London Gatwick at 20:43 UTC on 6 October 1961 destined for Perpignan in the south of France, just north of the Pyrenees. At 00:30 UTC, it reported overhead Toulouse at flight level 75 and estimated arrival at Perpignan at 01:12 UTC. In an area of intermittent rain and winds of variable force, it struck the side of the Canigó at an altitude of 7500 ft (2200 m).

A rescue team from the chalet at Courtalets arrived at the scene while pieces of the wreckage were still burning. An eyewitness described the scene as "apocalyptic; burned bodies lay on the ground in a 100 m radius around the wreckage."

== The aircraft ==
G-AMSW was Douglas Dakota IV, construction number 16171, built in 1944. It had originally been built for the United States Army Air Forces (tail no. 44-76587). In 1952, it was registered to Air Service Training Limited and in 1954 to Cambrian Airways. It was registered to Derby Aviation on 31 December 1958.

== Cause ==
Speculation as to the cause at one time suggested that the crash may have been due to disruption to compasses caused by the magnetic field associated with iron mines. However, the official inquiry concluded that "the accident was attributed to navigational error, the origin of which it was not possible to determine for lack of sufficient evidence."

The French inquiry found that the aircraft was flying at a height "below the safety altitude obtained from the correct application to the Toulouse – Perpignan route of the general instructions contained in the operations manual of Derby Aviation." The charts that may have been on board the aircraft, says the report, could have led to the calculation, on account of lack of uniformity in the heights presented, of differing safety altitudes. "It is not possible, however," said the report, "to establish what charts were effectively used by the crew; in fact the airline has not fixed the type of chart to be used by the pilot for the purpose of applying the formula specified in the operations manual." The report noted that the flight plan was not completed in accordance with French regulations, which were based on ICAO recommendations. The filed plan had specified only the point of departure, the en-route beacon at Dunsfold and the destination. According to French regulations it was mandatory to indicate the points at which airways were crossed and the points at which flight information region boundaries were crossed, and if necessary certain radio fixes should have been indicated, The report noted that, "as opposed to the British regulations, the French regulations require the filing of a flight plan when the flight is to be made in instrument flight rules."

The report found no particular meteorological phenomenon of exceptional intensity, though the weather was very cloudy. The only meteorological factor which could have affected the flight would have been the WNW direction of the wind on the second half of the route (from Limoges to Perpignan) giving a tail wind instead of the forecast wind from starboard, causing port drift.

The route chosen by the pilot was Limoges – Toulouse – Perpignan. Once it had passed Toulouse, the aircraft took a heading with the intention of flying directly to Perpignan without flying over Carcassonne. The inquiry thought it was probable that the crew relied on dead reckoning rather than radio compass. If so, they would have calculated the course by using the forecast wind (240°, 25kn), which would have given a drift to port of 10°. If the actual wind was in fact 290°, 25kn (therefore causing no drift), then the course would have become the effective track (137° true). If parallel lines are drawn through Toulouse and through the place of the accident on a bearing of 137° they are found to be about 8.5 km apart. In consequence, to intercept the track leading to the place of the accident, the minimum error in relation to a position over Toulouse would have been a passage by the aircraft of about 6.5 km to the west of Toulouse followed by the assumption of a heading (137° true) 75sec later. Although this reconstruction, says the report, seems to offer a perfectly acceptable solution in the absence of evidence to the contrary, including precise information of the kind which could be provided by a flight recorder, the commission could not consider it as definitive.

The captain of the aircraft, Capt Michael E. Higgins, had 5,624 hours of flying experience and had landed twice at Perpignan during the preceding six months, though after following the direct route Limoges – Perpignan. The co-pilot, 1st Officer Rex Hailstone (2,267 hours) had made five landings at Perpignan in the previous six months, though not on routes via Toulouse.

== Later crashes in the area ==
Following further accidents in the area, in 1967 a Flight International article reported:

IN A STATEMENT in the House of Commons on 5 June about the accidents to the Air Ferry DC-4 at Perpignan on 3 June and to the British Midland DC-4M Argonaut at Stockport on 4 June (see last week's issue, page 926), Mr Douglas Jay, President of the Board of Trade, said that he had given instructions for a "special review of the performance" of all operators of British-registered civil aircraft. He also said that there would be a public inquiry into the Stockport accident. The Perpignan accident will, as required by international agreement, be investigated by the French authorities with British representatives and advisers in attendance.

The article continued:

The case of the Perpignan accident is particularly important in relation to navigation aids and their use in areas of dangerous terrain. Since 1949 there have been at least nine crashes on or near Mt Canigó on the Franco-Spanish border: December 1950, Air Maroc Douglas DC-3 (three killed); February 1953, Noratlas (six); March 1955, Douglas C-47 (five); July 1957, Noratlas (ten); September 1958, French Air Force Broussard (five); 7 October 1961, Derby Aviation Douglas Dakota IV 3 (34); 11 January 1963, French Air Force Constellation (12); 11 September 1963, Airnautic Viking (40); and 3 June 1967 Air Ferry Douglas DC-4 (88).
