= Bravo Air Congo =

Airline of the Democratic Republic of the Congo

IATA	ICAO	Call sign
K6	BRV	BRAVO AIRCONGO
- Founded: 2006 (replacing Bravo Airlines, created in 2004)
- Ceased operations: 10 December 2007
- Hubs: Kinshasa N'Djili International Airport (FIH); Madrid Barajas International Airport (MAD)
- Fleet size: 5
- Destinations: 23
- Parent company: Bravo Airlines
- Headquarters: Kinshasa, Democratic Republic of the Congo
- Key people: Herminio Gil (Executive Vice President)

Bravo Air Congo was an airline based in Kinshasa, Democratic Republic of the Congo operating domestic and regional passenger services. Its main base was N'djili Airport.

The airline was listed on the List of air carriers banned in the European Union.

Bravo Air Congo suspended operations on 8 August 2008.

== History ==
Bravo Airlines was established in 2004 in Madrid, as a scheduled international and domestic passenger airline, registered in Spain. In 2006, wishing to expand their operations in the African market, Bravo Airlines became an airline group, and joined with several Congolese private investors, to create a new airline, named Bravo Air Congo. The new airline is registered in the Democratic Republic of Congo and began operations on 11 September 2006.

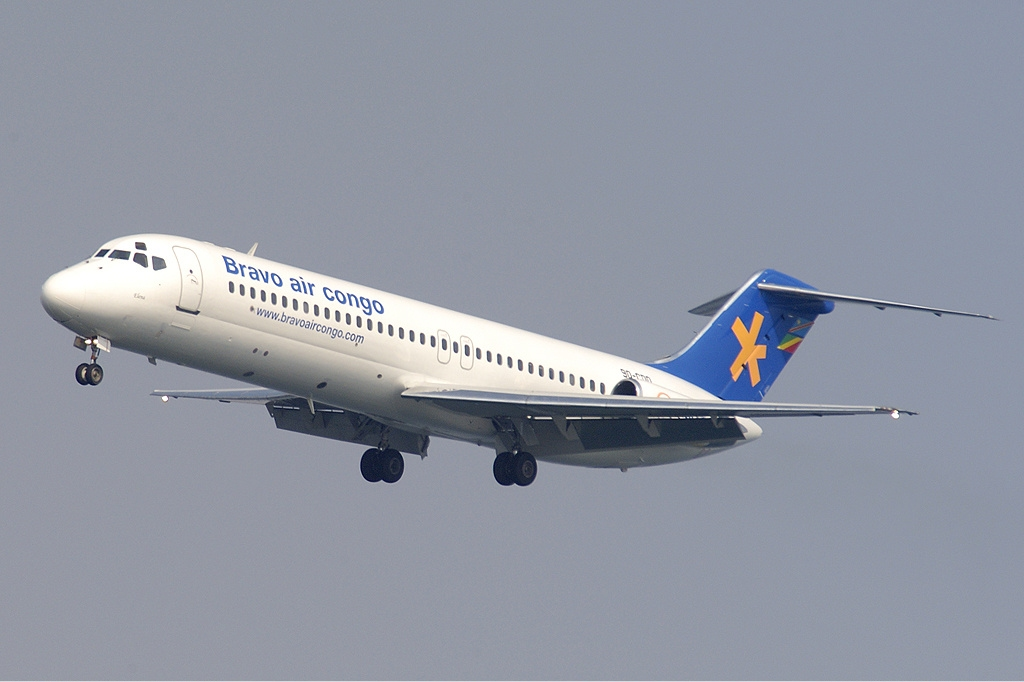
Bravo Air Congo McDonnell Douglas DC-9-32

== Destinations ==
Bravo Air Congo operated services to eight domestic destinations, including Gemena, Kalemie, Isiro and Lubumbashi, and eight cities in West Africa, as well as Johannesburg and Nairobi. Connections with its Spanish sister company, Bravo Airlines, link Brazzaville and Kinshasa with Brussels, Paris and Madrid.

The destinations of the Bravo Air Congo were (starting 11 September 2006):

=== Domestic ===
- Goma
- Isiro
- Kananga
- Kinshasa
- Kisangani
- Lubumbashi
- Mbuji-Mayi
- Bukavu

=== International ===
- Bangui
- Brazzaville
- Brussels
- Johannesburg
- Lagos
- Madrid
- Nairobi
- Paris (Charles de Gaulle Airport)
- Pointe-Noire

== Fleet ==
- 1 – Boeing 767
- 5 – Douglas DC-9

== See also ==
- Transport in the Democratic Republic of the Congo
