= Burundaiavia =

Helicopter airline of Kazakhstan

| IATA | ICAO | Call sign |
|---|---|---|
| - | BRY | BURAIR |
- Founded: 1946
- Operating bases: Boraldai airport
- Fleet size: 20 (as of 2020)
- Headquarters: Almaty, Kazakhstan
- Website: http://www.burundaiavia.kz/

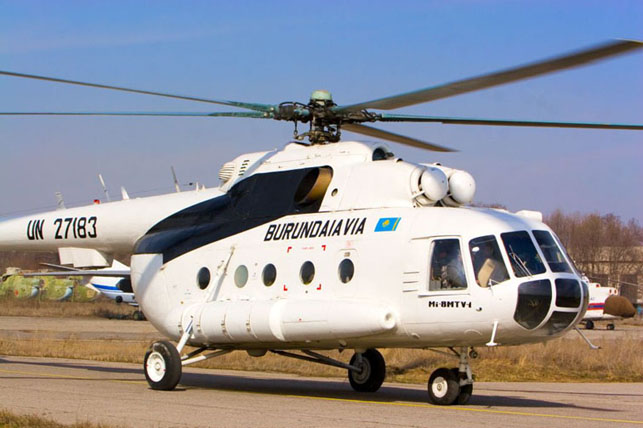
Burundaiavia Mi-8MTV-1 helicopter

JSC Burundaiavia was a helicopter airline based at Boraldai airport (former name Burundai), which is located about 5 km (3 mi) from Almaty, Kazakhstan. Burundaiavia has Air Operator Certificate No: KZ-01/001 granted by the Civil Aviation Committee of the Ministry of Transport and Communications of the Republic of Kazakhstan which allows carrying passengers and goods, including dangerous goods, performing aviation works. The Airline's ICAO code is BRY.

== History ==
The “Airline Burundaiavia” Joint Stock Company was established as a legal entity in October 2002, on the basis of “Burundai United Aviation Division” which history dates back to 1946.

In 2006, Burundaiavia was contracted to deliver food supplies to Afghanistan, and in January 2007 was recognized by the United Nations as an official supplier of food and aid, enabling the company to bid for United Nations aid contracts. The company was the first an only Kazakhstani company to be awarded such a status. Since then, the company has been contracted by the United Nations for a number of long-term projects in Afghanistan, Chad, the Democratic Republic of the Congo, Somalia, and Sudan. These projects include supplying United Nations missions, passenger transportation, delivering aid and food, search and rescue operations, and conducting evacuations.

The company has also been contracted wildfire fighting services in recent years, and has won contracts to combat such fires in Turkey and Indonesia.

== Fleet ==
As of February 2020, the company's fleet consists of 20 Mi-8MTV-1 helicopters, equipped with a number of navigational aids meant to help operate in low-visibility conditions
