= Berytos Airlines =

Lebanese airline

IATA	ICAO	Call sign
-	BYR	-
- Founded: 2003
- Ceased operations: 2008
- Fleet size: 1
- Headquarters: Hazmieh, Lebanon
- Website: http://www.berytosairlines.com/

Berytos Airlines was an airline based in Hazmieh, Lebanon.

== History and profile ==
The airline was established in 2003 and operated ad hoc charter flights. In 2008, it was closed down.

== Fleet ==
In 2005, Khors Aircompany wet leased a McDonnell Douglas DC-9-50 to the airline.
