= British Mediterranean Airways =

Airline of the United Kingdom (1994–2007)

- Airbus A321 in 2003
| IATA | ICAO | Call sign |
|---|---|---|
| KJ | LAJ | BEE MED |
- Founded: 28 October 1994
- Ceased operations: 27 October 2007 (sold to British Midland International)
- Hubs: Heathrow Airport
- Frequent-flyer program: Executive Club; BMI Diamond Club
- Alliance: Oneworld (affiliate; 1999–2007)
- Parent company: British Airways (1994–2007); British Midland International (Feb 2007–Oct 2007)
- Headquarters: Hounslow, England, United Kingdom
- Key people: Lord Hesketh (Chairman); David Richardson (CEO)

British Mediterranean Airways Limited (BMED), stylised as B|MED, was an airline with operations from London Heathrow Airport in England. It operated scheduled services as a British Airways franchise to 17 destinations in 16 countries throughout Africa, the Middle East, and Central Asia from London Heathrow. In February 2007, the airline was purchased by BMI, and continued as a British Airways franchise until the night of 27 October 2007, when it was absorbed into, and rebranded as, bmi.

Before the takeover it was headquartered at the Hetherington House in London Borough of Hounslow, near London Heathrow Airport. At an earlier point it was headquartered at the Cirrus House in the Borough of Hounslow, near Staines-upon-Thames and Stanwell, Surrey. At an earlier point its head office was in the City of Westminster.

The company held a United Kingdom Civil Aviation Authority Type A Operating Licence permitting it to carry passengers, cargo and mail on aircraft with 20 or more seats. The licence was revoked on 31 January 2008.

== History ==
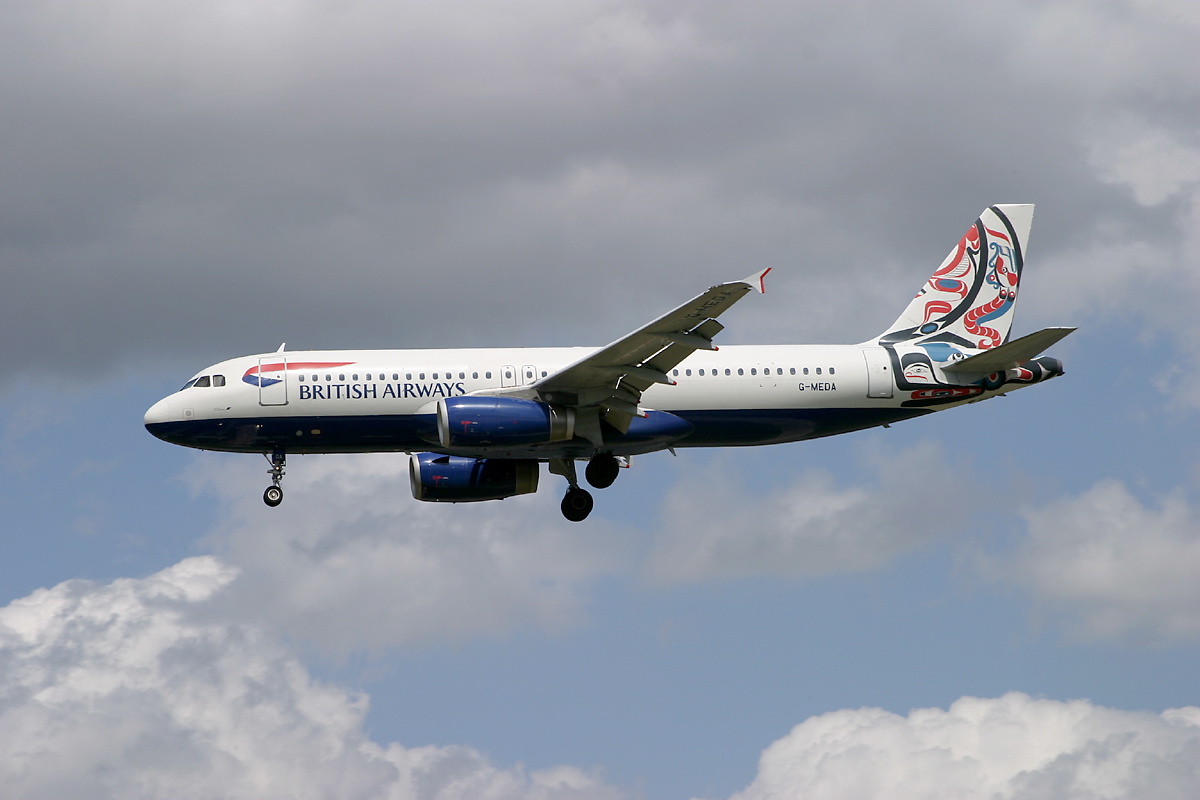
Airbus A320 in 2003

British Mediterranean Airways was established as a limited company in 1994 by a group of private investors led by Lord Hesketh. It began operations on 28 October that year. The airline operated the Airbus A320 from London Heathrow to Beirut, Lebanon. Damascus in Syria and Amman in Jordan were added to the network the following year, and the airline began flying a fortnightly charter service to Bishkek, capital of Kyrgyzstan.

In March 1997 the airline reached an agreement with British Airways, with BA withdrawing its competing services to Beirut, Damascus and Amman, leaving British Mediterranean as the sole operator on a BA franchise basis. Under this agreement the airline traded as British Airways, with all flights operated under BA flight codes (the range BA6500-6669 were allocated to BMED flights). All BMED aircraft were presented in full British Airways livery, appointed with the same interior and class product as the BA main fleet, and staff wore the BA uniform. BMED flights were booked through British Airways and the airline participated in BA's Executive Club and BA Miles programme. BMED was an affiliate member of Oneworld.

With the franchise agreement, British Mediterranean's operations moved from Heathrow's Terminal 3 to Terminal 4, allowing greater integration with the BA network. The airline greatly benefited from the franchise arrangement, taking over unprofitable BA mainline services better suited to BMED's lower cost base, to destinations such as Baku, Tehran, Addis Ababa and Almaty. British Mediterranean also launched a number of routes on its own, backed by the global sales and marketing of British Airways, as well as feeder traffic to and from Heathrow.

In 2004 BMED carried 277,000 passengers on its 6 aircraft, to 18 destinations in 17 countries. At that time BMED had flights to Tashkent, Uzbekistan. British Mediterranean Airways rebranded as BMED in November 2004, stating that the shorter name and revamped logo would help strengthen the airline's image.

On 12 March 2007, it was revealed that the airline was flying a "ghost flight" between London Heathrow and Cardiff International Airport six times a week. No seats were sold for the flight, and it was not announced in arrivals or departures, or on airport information screens. The flight was only made in order for BMED to retain a valuable take-off slot at London Heathrow, unused since it scrapped flights to Uzbekistan. Airlines with landing rights at London Heathrow are liable to lose them if they do not make at least 80% use of their allocation over a six-month session.

On 5 April 2007, G-MEDL was used to return 15 British Navy personnel captured by Iranian forces from Tehran to London Heathrow.

=== Impressions Inflight Magazine ===
The British Mediterranean Airways inflight magazine, titled Impressions, was the first for Ink now one of the world's largest publishers of such periodicals.

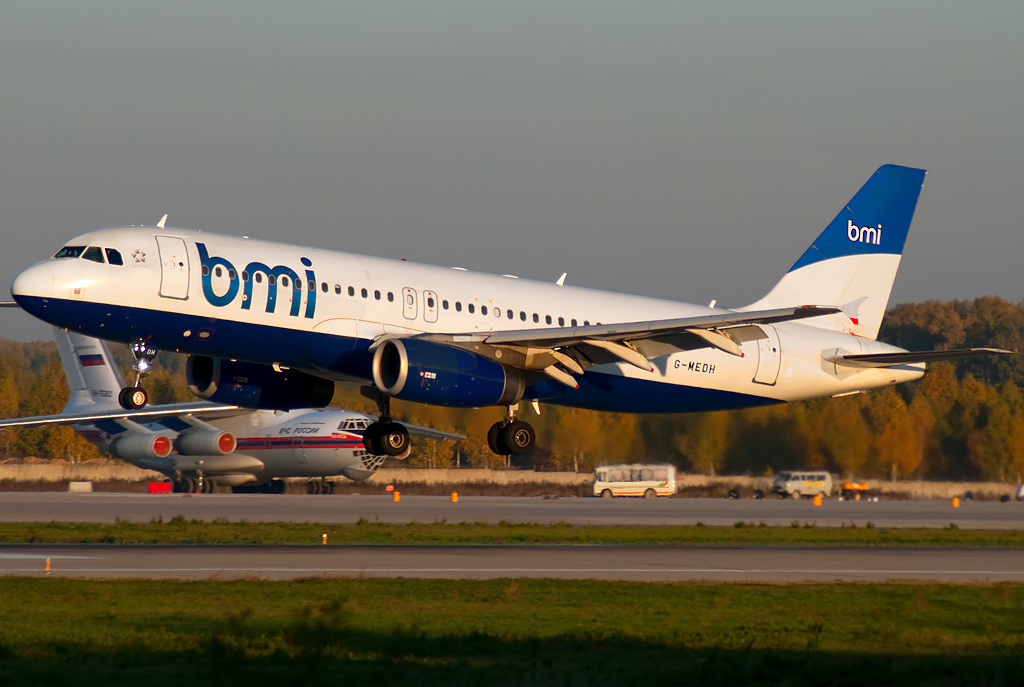
Former BMED A320 (G-MEDH) in hybrid BMI livery in October 2011

=== Sale to BMI ===
Following a period of losses, the airline was bought by BMI for £30 million in February 2007. The acquisition marked a change in strategy for BMI by focusing on more medium to long-haul routes. BMED's route network complemented BMI's existing routes.

The British Airways franchise ended on 27 October 2007, when the airline was fully absorbed into BMI branding. Aircraft were gradually repainted in the BMI livery, and flights received BMI's flight codes. As part of the acquisition, BMI sold BMED's Heathrow slots to British Airways for £30 million, to be transferred in late 2008.

== Destinations ==
BMED served the following on behalf of British Airways, from their hub at London Heathrow Airport:

- Armenia
  - Yerevan – Zvartnots International Airport
- Azerbaijan
  - Baku – Heydar Aliyev International Airport
- Ethiopia
  - Addis Ababa – Addis Ababa Bole International Airport
- Egypt
  - Alexandria – El Nouzha Airport
- Georgia
  - Tbilisi – Tbilisi International Airport
- Iran
  - Tehran – Mehrabad International Airport
- Jordan
  - Amman – Queen Alia International Airport
- Kazakhstan
  - Almaty – Almaty International Airport
- Kyrgyzstan
  - Bishkek – Manas International Airport
- Lebanon
  - Beirut – Beirut–Rafic Hariri International Airport
- Russia
  - Ekaterinburg – Koltsovo International Airport
- Senegal
  - Dakar – Léopold Sédar Senghor International Airport
- Sierra Leone
  - Freetown – Freetown International Airport
- Sudan
  - Khartoum – Khartoum International Airport
- Syria
  - Aleppo – Aleppo International Airport
  - Damascus – Damascus International Airport
- Turkey
  - Ankara – Ankara Esenboğa Airport
- Turkmenistan
  - Ashgabat – Aşgabat International Airport
- Uzbekistan
  - Tashkent – Tashkent International Airport

== Incidents and accidents ==
- On 31 March 2003, British Mediterranean Airways Flight 6711, an Airbus A320, was involved in a serious incident while approaching Addis Ababa Airport, Ethiopia. The pilots were unaware of a significant discrepancy in the aircraft flight management system position caused by the sole navigational beacon transmitting erroneous data. This same beacon was also being used to navigate the approach. The crew executed a go-around, the Enhanced Ground Proximity Warning System (EGPWS) "TERRAIN AHEAD, PULL UP" audio warning was triggered too late to be of any help, and later analysis showed that the aircraft passed within 56 ft (17 m) of terrain at its closest point. The AAIB determined that improper maintenance of the ADS VOR beacon had allowed water ingress causing the erroneous signal, which should have been detected by monitoring equipment, but this had been disconnected during construction work. Also, the Airbus EGPWS design relied on the same positional information as the navigation system.

== Fleet ==
The BMED fleet consisted of the following aircraft (at 27 October 2007):

- 3 Airbus A320-200
- 5 Airbus A321-200 (further 5 on order)

These aircraft were passed on to BMI.

== See also ==
- List of defunct airlines of the United Kingdom
