= Boraldai Airport =

Airport in Kazakhstan

- IATA: BXJ; ICAO: UAAR

Summary
- Operator: Altair Air
- Location: 5 km (3.1 mi) from Almaty, Kazakhstan
- Coordinates: 43°21′06″N 076°52′57″E

Maps
- Location in Kazakhstan
- Interactive map of Boraldai Airport

Runways
Direction	Length		Surface
Direction	m	ft	Surface
02/20	1,460	4,790	Asphalt

Boraldai Airport (former name Burundai) (IATA: BXJ, ICAO: UAAR) is situated within 5 km (3.1 mi) of Almaty, Kazakhstan. The owner of the airport is LLP "Altair Air". The airport is a main base for Kazakhstan airline Burundaiavia. The annual airshow of Kazakhstan takes place at the airport.

== Facilities ==
The complex includes: air terminal with an area of 1,501 m^{2} (16,160 sq ft); runway 1,460 m × 35 m (4,790 ft × 115 ft); two taxiways 14 m (46 ft) and 8 m (26 ft); technical maintenance base with the area of 1,981 m^{2} (21,320 sq ft); apron and parking stands; railway stub station and the hotel. It is suitable for helicopters of all types, such as Mi-2, Mi-6, Mi-8, Mi-10, Ka-32 and light aircraft, such as An-24, An-26, An-30, An-72 and An-74. The territory of the airport area is 705,000 m^{2} (7,590,000 sq ft).
