= Bravo Airlines =

Spanish airline

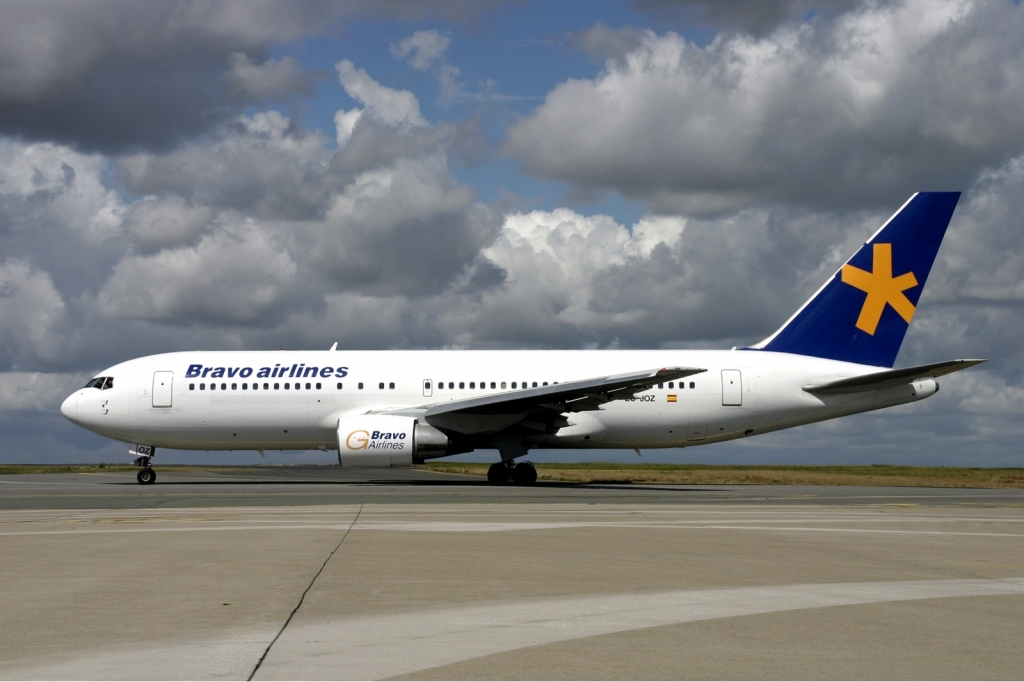
| IATA | ICAO | Call sign |
|---|---|---|
| BQ | BBV | BRAVO |
- Founded: 2004
- Ceased operations: 2008
- Hubs: Madrid Barajas International Airport
- Fleet size: 1
- Headquarters: Madrid, Spain

Bravo Airlines was an airline based in Madrid, Spain. Its main base was Madrid Barajas International Airport.

== Fleet ==
The Bravo Airlines fleet included the following aircraft (as of 21 September 2008):

- 1 Boeing 767-200ER (which was operated for Air Ivoire)

== See also ==
- List of defunct airlines of Spain
