= British Midland International =

Airline of the United Kingdom (1938–2012)

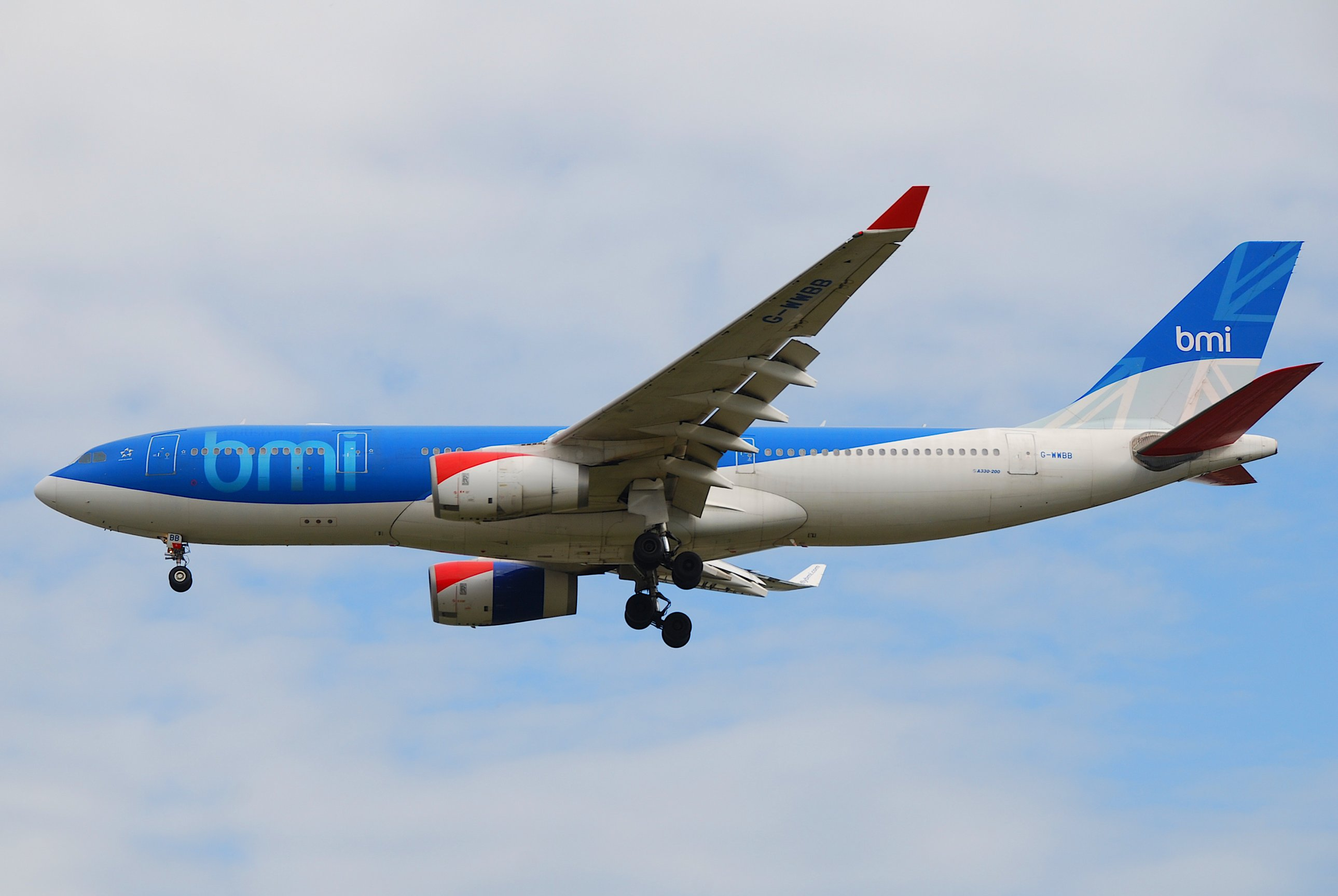
- Airbus A330-200 in 2009
IATA	ICAO	Call sign
BD	BMA	MIDLAND
- Founded: 1938 (as Air Schools Limited)
- Commenced operations: 1949 (as Derby Aviation)
- Ceased operations: 27 October 2012 (merged into British Airways)
- Hubs: London–Heathrow; Manchester
- Frequent-flyer program: BMI Diamond Club
- Alliance: Star Alliance (2000–2012)
- Subsidiaries: 2nd Manx Airlines (1982–1988); Loganair (1983–1998); London City Airways (1986–1990); Manx Airlines Europe (1990–1996); bmibaby (2002–2012); British Mediterranean Airways (2007)
- Parent company: SAS Group (1987–1999); Lufthansa (1999–2012); International Airlines Group (Apr 2012–Oct 2012)
- Headquarters: Donington Hall, Castle Donington, England
- Key people: Peter Simpson; Sir Michael Bishop; Vagn Sørensen; Wolfgang Prock-Schauer

British Midland Airways Ltd., trading at various times throughout its history as British Midland, and bmi British Midland International, was an airline in the United Kingdom with its head office in Donington Hall in Castle Donington, close to East Midlands Airport, England. The airline flew to destinations in Europe, the Middle East, Africa, North America and Central Asia from its main hub at London Heathrow Airport, where at its peak it held about 13% of all slots and operated over 2,000 flights a week. BMI was a member of Star Alliance from 1 July 2000 until 20 April 2012.

British Midland Airways/bmi British Midland International was acquired from Lufthansa by International Airlines Group (IAG) on 20 April 2012, and was integrated into British Airways (BA) by 27 October 2012. Subsidiaries Bmibaby and BMI Regional were also purchased, although IAG did not wish to retain either. BMI Regional was sold to Sector Aviation Holdings in May 2012 and operated under the flybmi brand until it went into administration on 16 February 2019, whereas Bmibaby closed down in September 2012.

British Midland Airways Limited held a Civil Aviation Authority (CAA) Type A Operating Licence, permitting it to carry passengers, cargo and mail on aircraft with 20 or more seats.

== History ==
=== Origins ===
The airline dates back to 1938, when Captain Roy Harben established Air Schools Limited as a school for training pilots of the Royal Air Force Volunteer Reserve. Harben had been approached by the Derby Corporation to run a new aerodrome under construction near Burnaston, which was planned to eventually become an airport. Sir Kingsley Wood, the Secretary of State for Air, officially opened the aerodrome as Derby Municipal Airport on 17 June 1939. Military flying training continued at the airport throughout the war.

Air Schools Limited formed a parent company, Derby Aviation Ltd., in 1946 (fully registered on 16 February 1949), and Harben died the following year of a heart attack. His wife remained the controlling shareholder of the business and asked E. W. Phillips, who had been involved in running the flying school with Captain Harben, to become the new managing director. The new parent company also incorporated Wolverhampton Aviation, based at Pendeford, which offered ad hoc charter and freight flights with de Havilland Dragon Rapides, as well as aircraft maintenance and brokerage.

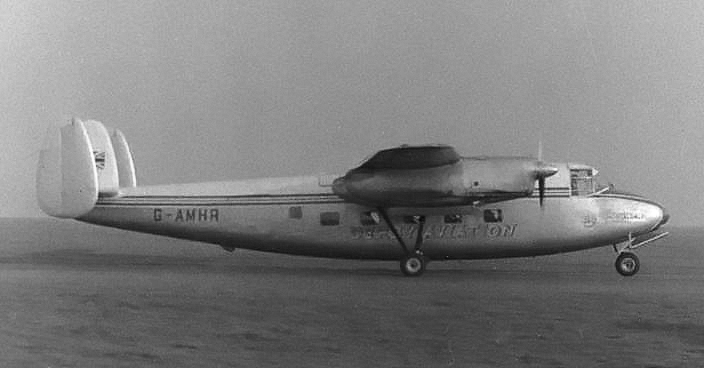
A Miles M.60 Marathon in 1956

Airline-type operations started in early 1949 with occasional charter flights with DH.89 de Havilland Dragon Rapide and Miles M.60 Marathon. In 1953, Derby Aviation ceased flying training, following the award of a licence to operate scheduled flights from Burnaston and Wolverhampton to Jersey. Flights in each direction were required to land at Elmdon Airport in Birmingham to allow passengers to clear customs. The first flight was made on 18 July 1953, using a DH.89. The following year, Wolverhampton Aviation was merged into Derby Aviation, and, in 1955, the company purchased its first Douglas DC-3, a converted former military transport.

International services to Ostend commenced in 1956, and flights carrying holidaymakers from the UK to mainland Europe began as well. Three M.60s flew a strange route - via Kidlington-Oxford-Hurn-Bournemouth - to Channel Islands, and from Derby to the Isle of Man and northward to Glasgow. The company was also contracted by Rolls-Royce to transport aero engines to customers all over the world. On 12 March 1959, Derby Aviation formed Derby Airways Ltd. as its airline business and introduced a new livery incorporating the new airline's name. Domestic scheduled flights within the United Kingdom began the same year. Five Canadair C-4s were bought second-hand between 1961 and 1962, with cabin acccommodation for 78 passenger and were used on scheduled services, ITs and ad-hoc charters.

=== British Midland Airways ===
==== 1960s and 70s ====
On 1 October 1964, after buying the Manchester Airport-based scheduled and charter airline Mercury Airlines assets, the company changed its name to British Midland Airways (BMA) and moved operations from Burnaston to the recently opened East Midlands Airport, close to Castle Donington. The corporate colours of blue and white were adopted at that time, along with the first turboprop aircraft, a Handley Page Dart Herald.

Minster Assets, a London-based investment and banking group, acquired the airline in 1968, and in 1969 promoted former Mercury ground handling manager Michael Bishop to become the company's general manager. From this point, Bishop drove the company forward, with domestic and European expansion continuing apace. As a first step, in November 1969, BMA took over Autair's Heathrow–Teesside route, which marked the airline's Heathrow debut. From January till July 1969 British Midland-Invicta Cargo brand was used for freight operations jointly operated with Invicta Airways.

In 1970, BMA entered the jet age with the introduction of three new BAC One-Eleven 500s, followed by an ex-Pan Am Boeing 707-321 in 1971. The former had been intended to be primarily used on European inclusive tour (IT) charters while the latter was to be mainly used on transatlantic "affinity group" charters. Also in 1970, BMA became the first British airline independent from government-owned corporations to employ UK-based, non-White cabin crew.

Following his appointment as managing director in 1972, Bishop withdrew the One-Elevens from service, two of which were swapped for three Handley Page Dart Heralds while the third was subsequently leased to Court Line. As the early-model, high-time second-hand 707s commanded a low resale value, the airline decided to keep these aircraft and lease them out to other airlines on a wet lease basis, beginning in November 1972 with a £3.3 million, two-year contract to operate Sudan Airways' Blue Nile service between Khartoum and London. The decision to pull out of both the IT and "affinity group" markets was taken to reverse heavy losses BMA had incurred on these charter operations due to its lack of scale and lack of vertical integration with a tour operator, which put it at a commercial disadvantage vis-à-vis the competition, as well as uneconomical charter rates as a result of overcapacity. This resulted in BMA concentrating on regional, short-haul scheduled services and ad hoc charters using turboprops such as the Herald and Viscount as these were more economical than contemporary jets on short, thin routes. The success of the airline's wet lease operation resulted in an increase in the number of Boeing 707s allocated to this activity, including the addition of several later model 707-320B and -320C aircraft from 1976. All of these were leased to other operators, with none operating for BMA on scheduled or charter services until 1981.

On 1 November 1974, BMA began operating between London Gatwick and Belfast, where it replaced the service previously operated by British Caledonian. London–Belfast was BMA's first UK domestic trunk route and the first all-year round route it served in indirect competition with British Airways (BA). BMA's Gatwick debut also made it the only airline at the time to operate scheduled services from all five contemporary London airports – Gatwick, Heathrow, Luton, Southend and Stansted.

In January 1975, an agreement was reached for BMA to provide two Vickers Viscounts in Cyprus Airways livery to link Athens with Cyprus. A former WWII airfield at Larnaca was selected to serve the south of the island, following the Turkish invasion of Cyprus in 1974. The first flights departed Larnaca on 10 February 1975. On 4 April 1975, the Daily Mail chartered a BMA Boeing 707 to assist the Project Vietnam Orphans and The Ockenden Venture charities in evacuating 150 orphaned children from Saigon during the Vietnam War.

On 1 September 1976, jets began gradually replacing the turboprop fleet on most of BMA's domestic and European services, when the airline's first Douglas DC-9 (a second-hand -15 leased from the manufacturer) replaced Viscounts on the Heathrow–Tesside route.

In 1978, Minster Assets sought to sell the company. With the help of a Californian entrepreneur, Robert F. Beauchamp, Bishop raised £2.5 million to lead the management buy-out, and was appointed chairman as a result, afterwards stating "I had to borrow the money from an American citizen. Most venture capitalists want a return of 40% to make up for all their other failures and they want an exit strategy." That year, British Midland and British Airways agreed to swap some of their routes, resulting in BMA relinquishing its routes from Birmingham to Brussels and Frankfurt, and BAW handing over its routes from Liverpool to London Heathrow, Belfast, Dublin, Jersey, the Isle of Man and Glasgow. Annual passenger numbers topped 1 million for the first time in 1979.

==== 1980s and 90s ====
In 1981, the CAA turned down BMA's application to fly between Heathrow, Glasgow and Edinburgh, but the Secretary of State for Trade and Industry upheld the airline's appeal against the CAA's ruling. The decision to overturn the CAA's ruling enabled the airline to commence its first domestic trunk route from the UK's premier airport on 25 October 1982, when it launched six daily return flights between Heathrow and Glasgow operated with DC-9s. Although these flights were not as frequent as the competing hourly BA shuttle, BMA offered keener fares and a full in-flight service (compared with the no frills shuttle). Following BMA's success on the Heathrow–Glasgow route, the airline began flying between Heathrow and Edinburgh (1983) and Heathrow and Belfast (1984). With the introduction of these services, BMA and BA were now in direct competition on the UK's three busiest domestic trunk routes. BMA's competitive pressure on BA resulted in the latter replacing its no frills shuttle service with an upgraded Super Shuttle that included a full breakfast, hot drinks and a free bar service on both Heathrow–Glasgow and Heathrow–Edinburgh from September 1983. (BA subsequently extended Super Shuttle to Heathrow–Belfast as well following the launch of BMA's competing service in 1984, in turn resulting in BMA abandoning Gatwick–Belfast which was taken over by Dan-Air.)

Also in 1982, BMA, together with British & Commonwealth (the owners of AirUK at the time), formed Manx Airlines, and the following year it purchased a 75% stake in Glasgow-based regional airline Loganair from The Royal Bank of Scotland. In October 1984, the Boeing 707 fleet was withdrawn, having been used extensively on lease operations for other airlines across the world.

The British Midland logo introduced in 1985

In 1985, a new aircraft livery featuring a dark blue upper half and tail, with a light grey lower half separated by a thin, white stripe, was introduced. At this time, BMA was branded simply British Midland, and a new logo featuring a stylised red BM crowned with a white diamond shape appeared on aircraft tailfins. This livery subsequently featured a darker blue upper half and tail, with a deep grey lower half separated by two thin stripes, very dark blue at the top and red at the bottom. However, the logo on the aircraft's fins remained unchanged.

The conclusion of the first fully liberalised bilateral air transport agreement in Europe between the United Kingdom and the Netherlands in 1985, as well as a legal technicality exempting the airline from the "London [Air] Traffic Distribution Rules" (a government policy that sought to compel all airlines that were planning to operate an international scheduled service to or from Heathrow for the first time to use Gatwick instead) as a result of having operated a Heathrow–Strasbourg scheduled service prior to this policy coming into effect on 1 April 1978, enabled BMA to compete directly with BA between Heathrow and Amsterdam from 29 June 1986. This resulted in BMA becoming the first private, independent airline to compete with then wholly government-owned BA on an international trunk route from Heathrow.

The Diamond Club frequent flyer programme (FFP) launched on 1 October 1987, coinciding with the introduction of an enhanced business class style, single-class Diamond Service featuring a full meal and free onboard drinks service for all passengers, regardless of the fare paid, as well as airport lounges at the airline's major UK destinations. These service enhancements helped increase British Midland's market share on the main London–Scotland and London–Northern Ireland trunk routes to 30%. All aircraft in the fleet were named after diamonds, beginning with a DC-9 named The Tiffany Diamond, unveiled by Rosamond Monckton, the managing director of Tiffany's in London. The company slogan was Better for Business (2009–2010).

In March 1987, Airlines of Britain Holdings (ABH) was formed to act as a holding company for British Midland Airways and British Midland Aviation Services. British Midland operated its final Viscount flight on 20 February 1988, 21 years after the airline had first operated the type. That year, British Midland also became the first to operate the British Aerospace (BAe) ATP for which it had been the launch customer. The BAe ATP was the airline's last turboprop type. From 1 April 1990 Diamond Line was the name adopted for charter activities.

In 1992, British Midland became the first airline to offer a vegetarian choice of in-flight meals on UK domestic flights and one of the first in Europe to do so on domestic services. The following year, the airline introduced Diamond EuroClass on its European routes, the first time it had offered a separate cabin for business travellers. Initially, Diamond EuroClass was competitively priced, with the highest fares being the same as rivals' published economy class fares.

On 30 September 1996, British Midland began offering Diamond EuroClass on all its domestic routes, becoming the second airline in the UK after Jersey European Airways (which had pioneered business class on UK domestic routes in 1993) to offer a separate cabin for business travellers on domestic routes and the first to do so on domestic trunk routes from Heathrow.

ABH became British Midland Plc in 1997, when it was de-merged as part of major corporate restructuring. Towards the end of the 1990s, British Midland switched its aircraft suppliers from Boeing and Fokker to Airbus and Embraer, selecting A319/320/321s and ERJ 135/145s to replace 737s and F70/100s. In July 1999, Bishop formally opened the British Midland Training Centre in Stockley Close. That year, Scandinavian Airlines System (SAS), a shareholder in British Midland since 1987, sold half its stake to Lufthansa followed by British Midland joining Star Alliance (in 2000).

=== BMI-British Midland International ===
The BMI logo introduced in 2001

Following research that had established that people in the UK tended to confuse British Midland with the Midland Bank or British Airways and that many outside the UK could not relate to the term "Midland", the air carrier launched a new corporate identity in 2001, rebranding the airline as BMI British Midland (subsequently shortened to BMI), officially from 1 February. Aircraft received a new livery of royal blue, white and a fading Union Flag on the tail, along with the new lower case BMI logotype. Also in 2001, BMI introduced the Airbus A330-200, its first widebodied aircraft type, into the fleet to enable it to serve the United States and other long-haul destinations. Bilateral restrictions implemented in the 1977 Bermuda II agreement meant the airline could neither fly its own aircraft to the US from its main base at Heathrow nor sell tickets on codeshare flights operated by Star Alliance partner United Airlines from the airport, as had been planned. Instead, it launched flights from Manchester to Washington Dulles and Chicago O'Hare in May and June 2001 respectively. Initially, the new A330s operated both routes; however, the Washington service was subsequently downgraded to a narrowbody operation using a Boeing 757-200 leased from Icelandair before being axed in 2005.

The airline carried 7.5 million passengers during 2002. By 2005, the total had risen to 10.1 million, the third highest of any UK airline. In early 2006, the Association of European Airlines (AEA) reported a drop in passengers carried and load factor for BMI mainline and regional services (excluding Bmibaby) whilst reporting increased loads for other AEA members over the same period.

BMI operated a service to Mumbai from London Heathrow between May 2005 and October 2006, after the UK and India amended their bilateral air services agreement. Services to Riyadh followed, commencing on 1 September 2005, after British Airways ceased to serve Saudi Arabia earlier that year. BMI also launched a scheduled service to Moscow Domodedevo in co-operation with Transaero Airlines on 29 October 2006, which used a dedicated A320 aircraft (G-MIDO) with special seating for the service, including leather seats and a 40" seat pitch. In 2007 the airline launched non-stop services from its Heathrow hub to Cairo and Amman, raising the airline's profile in the Middle East significantly. BMI announced on 5 November 2008 that it would end all longhaul operations from Manchester Airport. The two Airbus A330 aircraft based there were moved to Heathrow.

In February 2007, BMI bought British Mediterranean Airways (BMED), a British Airways franchise partner, and as a result gained access to new markets in Africa, the Middle East and Central Asia that were served by that carrier. As a condition of the sale, BMI sold BMED's Heathrow slots to British Airways for £30 million. BMED was fully integrated into BMI on 28 October of that same year.

The decision by the European Commission (EC) in 2008 to accord secondary slot trading by European airlines – the practice of buying and selling take-off and landing slots at congested airports – legal recognition resulted in BMI valuing its Heathrow slot holding at £770 million. Its first-time inclusion in BMI's 2007 annual report also resulted in a huge boost to the airline's net asset value, which stood at only £12 million the year before. It can therefore be argued that the EC's decision to legalise this practice made BMI an attractive takeover target for other Heathrow-based airlines and helped it avert bankruptcy.

In November 2009, following the complete takeover of BMI by Lufthansa, the airline announced a restructuring of its mainline and regional operations in an effort to suspend loss-making routes and adjust capacity. The measures included a fleet reduction of nine aircraft from the mainline fleet (two of which were operated by BMI Regional) and the suspension of routes from London Heathrow to Amsterdam, Brussels, Tel Aviv, Kyiv and Aleppo in 2010. Seasonal routes from London Heathrow to Palma and Venice were also discontinued. It was said that the restructuring could result in the loss of around 600 jobs – around 13% of the airline's workforce.

On 12 January 2010, BMI announced that the number of daily flights between Dublin and London Heathrow would be reduced from 28 March from six to four due to the economic climate, which depressed consumer demand. This resulted in the closure of the Dublin base, which consisted of one plane and 33 cabin crew.

=== British Midland International ===
In April 2010, the airline announced it would begin using British Midland International name, whilst retaining the BMI logo and continuing to be known by those initials in the domestic market. The decision to revert to the old British Midland name and to spell out for the first time what the I in BMI was supposed to stand for was taken in response to research showing that for passengers based in the Middle East, who accounted for a significant number of the airline's premium bookings, BMI did not mean anything, and that these people preferred a name with the word "British" in it.

Following increasing heavy losses that exceeded £100 million per year by 2012, BMI decided to stop offering business class on domestic flights and introduce a number of new, longer range international scheduled services from Heathrow to ensure the most profitable use of its highly prized (and sought-after) slots at the severely capacity-constrained airport. This entailed aircraft downsizing (replacing Airbus mainline jets with Embraer regional jets), frequency reductions and route cutbacks on the airline's loss-making short-haul routes from the airport, including axing its by then heavily loss-making Heathrow–Glasgow route from 27 March 2011. The decision to exit the Heathrow–Glasgow market after almost 30 years' continuous operation was blamed on a big rise in the fees BAA levied on domestic passengers at Heathrow, which had resulted in unsustainable losses of £1 million per month.

BMI's last-ever commercial flight using a "BD"-prefixed flight number touched down at London Heathrow on 27 October 2012. It was operated by Airbus A321-231 G-MEDF. Legally the airline had been merged into British Airways on the previous 19 April.

== Services ==
=== In-flight service ===
On flights from London Heathrow within the UK and to Ireland, economy class passengers had a selection of food items available for purchase; flexible economy class passengers were offered complimentary snacks and drinks. On European flights and services to Tripoli, Tunisia and Morocco, a two-class in-flight service was in place, with a hot three course meal for the business cabin and complimentary food and drinks served in the economy cabin. On mid-haul and the Freetown route, a two-class in-flight service was also in place. The business cabin was served a three course meal and was provided in-flight entertainment. A hot meal and complimentary drinks were served in the economy cabin. On A330 services to Saudi Arabia and Israel (until 2010), business, premium economy (only on board the flights to Israel) and economy cabins were available, each provided with complimentary drinks and food.

=== Frequent flyer programme ===
Diamond Club was the frequent-flyer programme of BMI, with three membership levels: Blue, Silver and Gold. After sale to IAG, and being integrated into British Airways, Diamond Club members were offered a status match - BMI Gold to BA Gold, BMI Silver to BA Silver and BMI Blue to BA Blue (BA's base level). At the time of transfer, BA did not offer a lifetime status, so members who held BMI Lifetime Gold having qualified for 10 years in succession were only matched to BA Gold and were required to re-qualify every year to maintain that status level.

== Corporate affairs ==
=== Overview ===
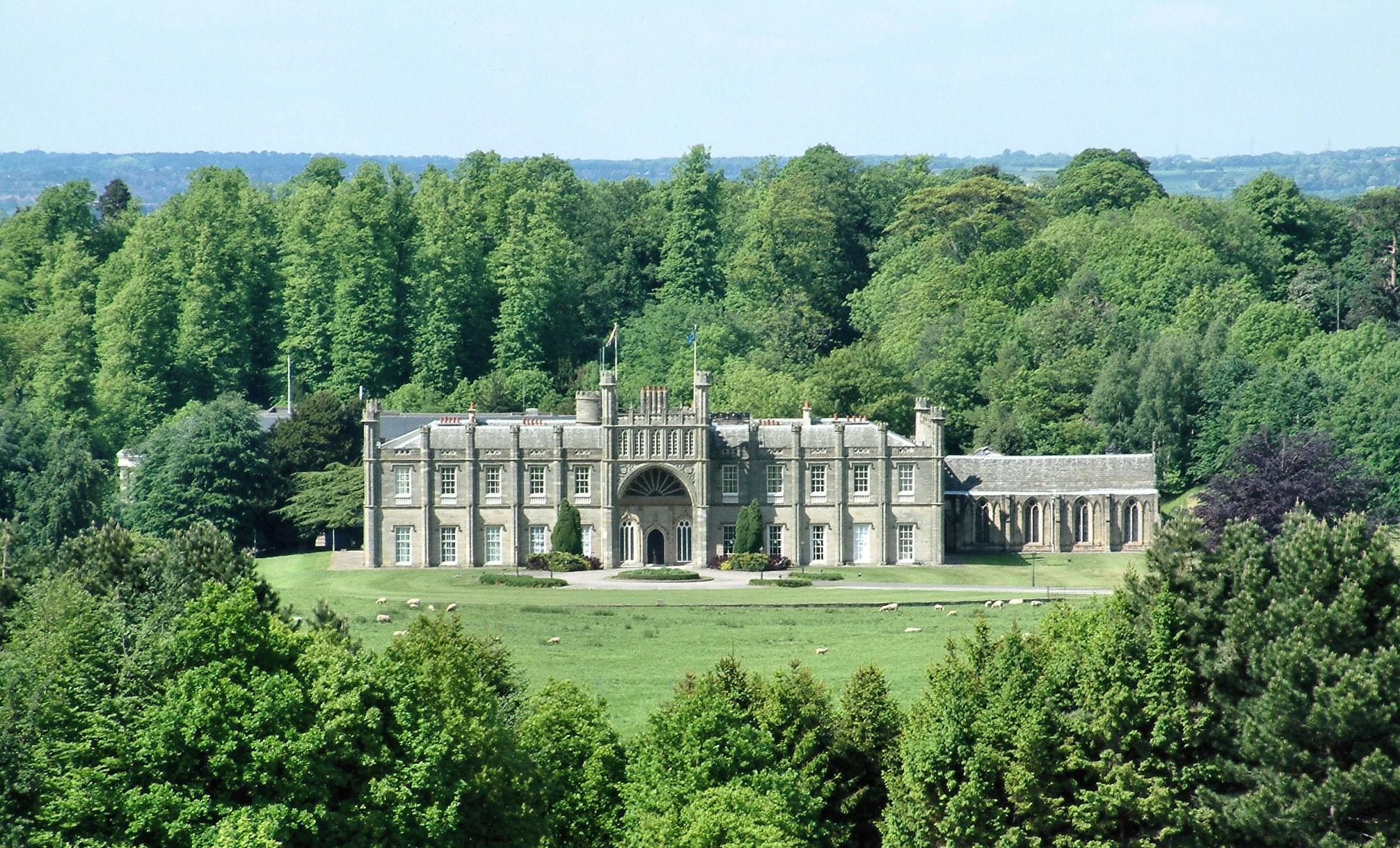
Donington Hall, head office of BMI

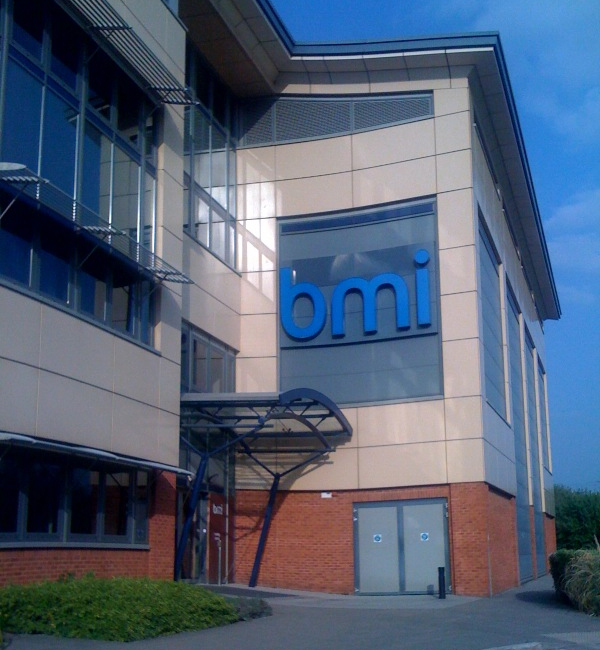
The BMI training centre at the Stockley Close Industrial Estate near London Heathrow Airport

The airline had its head office at Donington Hall in Castle Donington in North West Leicestershire, near Derby. The airline's head office was previously at 78 Buckingham Gate in the City of Westminster, London (until 1982). In 2011, BMI employed 527 staff at Donington Hall. In 2012, International Airlines Group announced that it may lay off up to 1,200 BMI employees, with proposed layoffs mainly from the head office.

BMI also operated a flight training centre in the Stockley Close Industrial Estate in West Drayton, London Borough of Hillingdon, near London Heathrow Airport. The centre opened in 1999 and BMI had a 50-year lease on the property running from 25 March 1999 to 24 March 2049.

=== Ownership ===
In 1999, SAS sold half of its 40% stake in British Midland to Lufthansa, which was seeking a stronger position at London Heathrow, following which British Midland joined Star Alliance. At the time, British Midland chairman Sir Michael Bishop owned a 50% share of the company. Between 1999 and 2004, Lufthansa sought to sell some or all of its share in the airline. Virgin Atlantic hoped to buy the shares to then merge both airlines, as BMI was already Virgin's preferred feeder airline into Heathrow. Virgin argued that the merger would have brought together two airlines with combined ticket sales of more than £2 billion, forming a powerful force in the aviation industry. BMI was believed to have initiated the talks after it began losing money following the 11 September 2001 attacks. A merger would have strengthened Virgin Atlantic's base at Heathrow, where BMI had hundreds of highly valued take-off and landing slots, to increase the competition with British Airways.

The two airlines combined would have had 17% of Heathrow slots against British Airways' 43%. Worried about the increased competition it would face if such a merger went ahead, British Airways considered the takeover of either BMI or Virgin Atlantic to stop the merger. British Airways concluded it would be easier to take over the financially weaker and less high-profile BMI. However, in 2004 talks of any merger of the three airlines ended. In late 2006, the airline again dismissed renewed speculation that Virgin Atlantic was preparing to make a bid to acquire full control of BMI, despite Sir Richard Branson repeating in a radio interview that such a merger would be a logical business move.

In June 2007, SAS announced that it would sell its 20% stake to improve its own group profits. The airline commented that it was in early discussions with Lufthansa as a potential buyer. In October 2008 Lufthansa announced it would be taking over BMI by purchasing the 50% shareholding of Sir Michael Bishop to consolidate with the 30% share it already owned.

The European antitrust body approved the takeover on 14 May 2009, allowing Lufthansa to become the majority stakeholder. Due to landing rights issues, the stake would be tentatively held by a Lufthansa-controlled but British-based company, LHBD Holding. Once new bilateral agreements were in place, Lufthansa would take direct control. In June 2009 it was announced that Lufthansa would buy the remaining stake in the airline from Bishop for less than originally agreed upon.

=== Sale to International Airlines Group ===
Lufthansa announced in September 2011 that it planned to sell BMI following continued losses. Virgin Atlantic were mooted to be considering an offer; but in early November British Airways' parent company, International Airlines Group, announced an agreement in principle to purchase the airline. Virgin Atlantic confirmed on 12 December 2011 that it had also made an offer for BMI and signed an agreement in late November to allow them to conduct due diligence on the airline. The bid amount of around £50 million was half that offered by IAG; Virgin hoped that a quick sale due to fewer potential regulatory issues would convince Lufthansa to sell to Virgin.

On 22 December 2011, IAG confirmed it had entered a contract to buy BMI from Lufthansa for £172.5 million. This would increase IAG's share of take-off and landing slots at Heathrow from 45% to 53%. Branson pledged to fight the deal, urging European competition authorities to intervene. The deal included the option for Lufthansa to sell BMI Regional and Bmibaby separately, as they are not required by IAG; the deal price would be lowered should Bmibaby not be sold in time. Under the agreed contract, Lufthansa would continue to be responsible for the BMI pension scheme after the sale was completed, although following rejection by the pension regulator, it is now to enter the Pension Protection Fund.

On 30 March 2012, the sale of BMI was approved, conditional on giving up control of 14 daily slots at London Heathrow. Twelve of these were required to change hands completely while the remaining two could continue be part of the airline's slot portfolio but needed to be leased out. The twelve slots eventually went to Virgin Atlantic, who subsequently used them to set up its UK domestic operation operating out of BMI's old domestic base at Heathrow Terminal 1. BMI's ownership transferred to IAG at 23:59 on 19 April 2012. The airline left Star Alliance, but membership benefits for both Star Alliance and BMI's Diamond Club continued until 31 May 2012.

The Diamond Club FFP continues for members with a BMI credit card, who earn points from their spend which can be converted to Avios, the currency of BA's FFP, Executive Club, on a 1:1 ratio. All other members were required to transfer to British Airways' Executive Club FFP.

British Midland Airways Limited continues to exist as a company, registered at British Airways' head office at Waterside in Harmondsworth, as of August 2017.

=== Subsidiaries ===
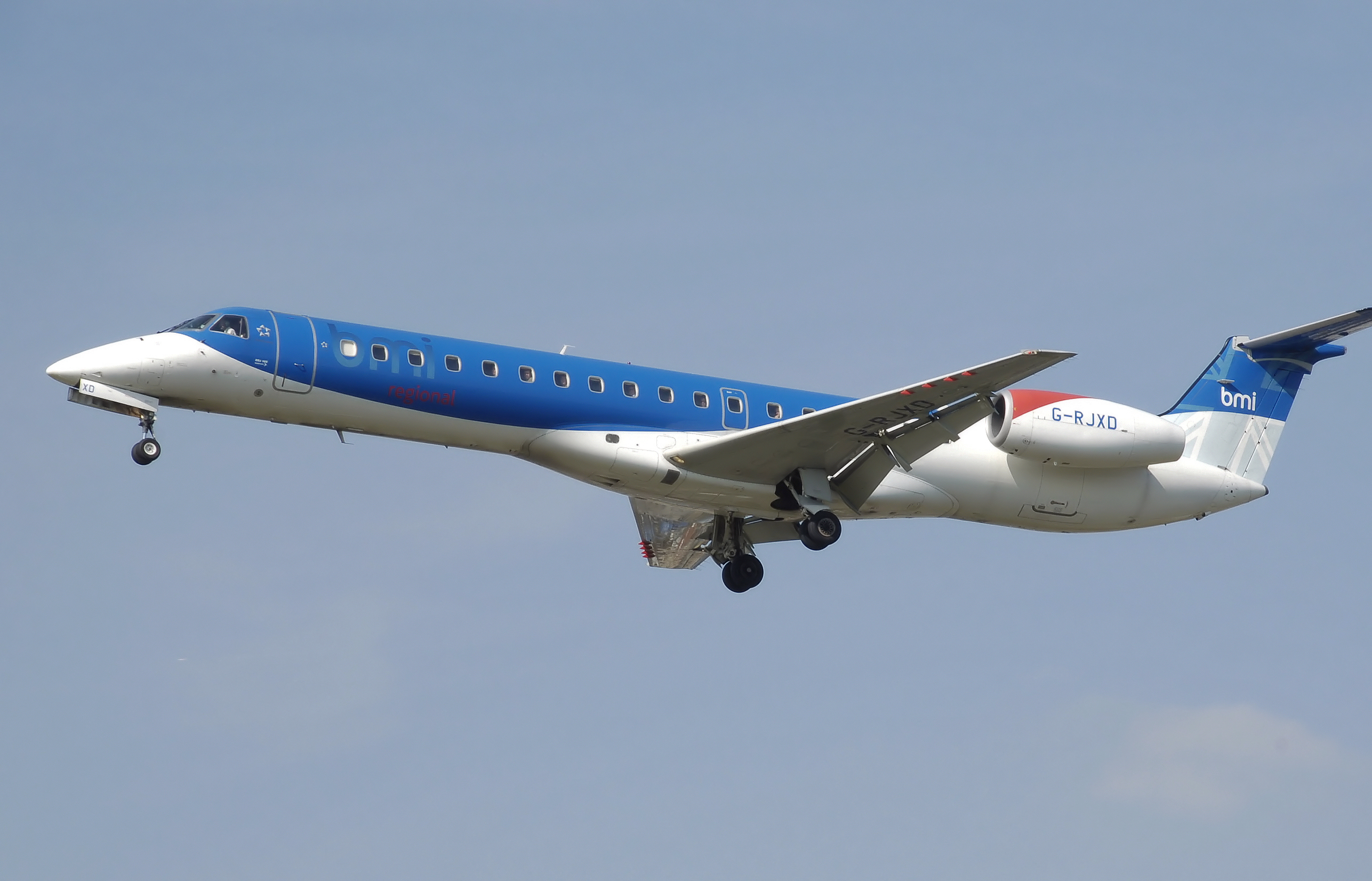
BMI Regional Embraer ERJ 145, 2007

- Manx Airlines Ltd., second airline with this name, was a 75% subsidiary from 1982 to 1988
- Loganair Ltd. was a subsidiary from 1983 to 1988
- Eurocity Express Ltd., renamed London City Airways, from 1986 to 1990
- Manx Airlines (Europe) from 1990 to 1996
- Business Air (which traded as British Midland Commuter 1998-2001), renamed British Midland Regional in 2001 (branded bmi regional 2001-2012) from 1998 to 2012. An agreement to sell the airline to the Scottish-based consortium Sector Aviation Holdings was reached in May 2012 and was completed on 1 June 2012. BMI Regional continued to operate regional services for BMI until 27 October 2012, when it began operations as an independent airline.
- Bmibaby from 2002 to 2012. A low-cost subsidiary operating Boeing 737s which were displaced after BMI's fleet renewal programme favoured an all-Airbus fleet. Bmibaby flew routes between major and secondary airports around Europe from its bases at East Midlands Airport, Manchester Airport and Birmingham Airport until it was closed down by IAG in September 2012.
- BMED-British Mediterranean Airways in 2007

=== Business trends ===
The key trends for BMI over its later years are shown below (figures as at year ending 31 December, and include Bmibaby). Financial data was reported in pounds sterling, and then in euros, because BMI was fully consolidated into the Lufthansa group of airlines on 1 July 2009.

		2005	2006	2007	2008	2009	2010
Turnover	(£m)	869	905	1,023	1,046	↓	
Turnover	(€m)					541	896
Pre-tax profits	(£m)	10.0	29.7	15.5	−155.6	↓	
Pre-tax profits	(€m)					−44	−117
Number of employees						4,346	3,613
Number of passengers (m)		10.5	10.5	10.6	10.0	n/a	6.2
Passenger load factor (%)		not available					
Number of aircraft (at year end)						67	59

== Destinations ==
=== Codeshare agreements ===
Throughout its existence, BMI had codeshare agreements with the following airlines:

- Aegean Airlines
- Air Canada
- Air China
- Air France
- Air India
- Air Malta
- Air New Zealand
- All Nippon Airways
- Asiana Airlines
- Austrian Airlines
- Avianca
- Azerbaijan Airlines
- Blue1
- British Airways (Merger partner)
- Brussels Airlines
- Continental Airlines
- Croatia Airlines
- Egyptair
- Ethiopian Airlines
- Etihad Airways
- Gulf Air
- LOT Polish Airlines
- Lufthansa
- Malaysia Airlines
- Oman Air
- Qatar Airways
- Royal Brunei Airlines
- Scandinavian Airlines
- South African Airways
- Spanair
- SriLankan Airlines
- Swiss International Air Lines
- TAM Airlines
- TAP Air Portugal
- Thai Airways International
- Transaero
- Ukraine International Airlines
- United Airlines
- US Airways
- Virgin Atlantic

== Fleet ==
=== Final fleet ===
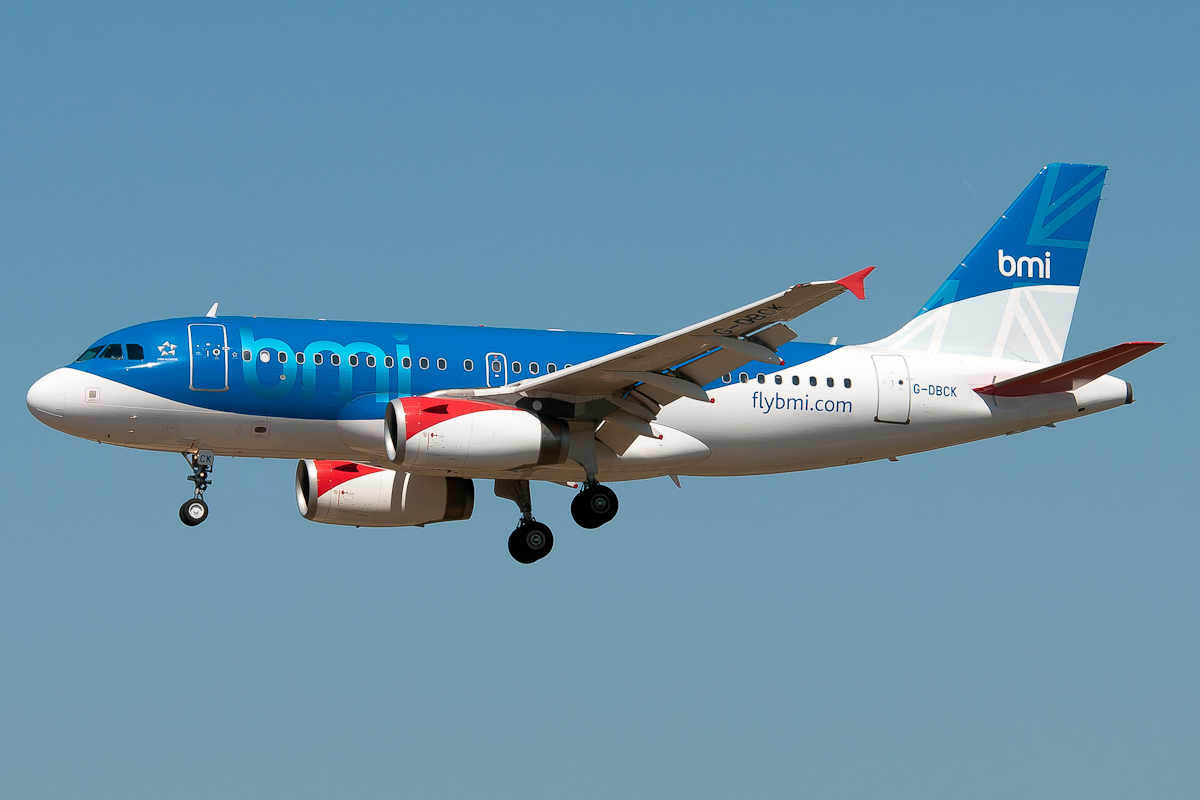
BMI Airbus A319-100

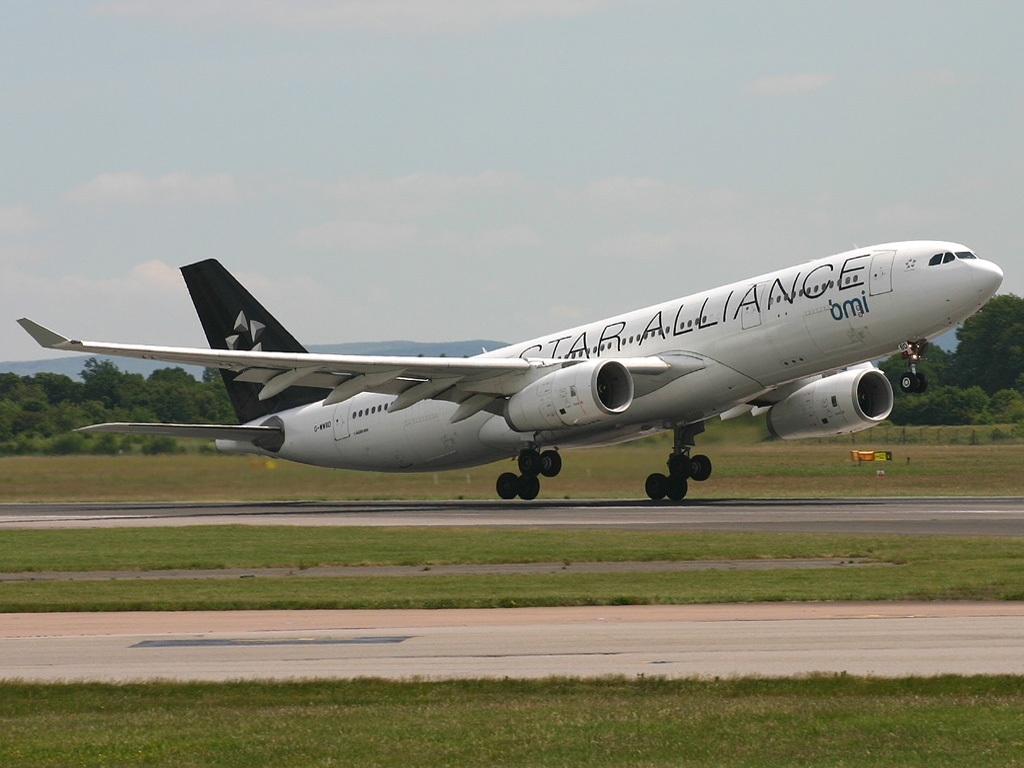
BMI Airbus A330-200 in Star Alliance livery

Following the sale of BMI to IAG, the airline's fleet began to be transferred to British Airways. All aircraft were transferred and repainted in the BA livery, excluding its three Airbus A330s which were returned to the lessors. At its peak prior to the commencement of licensing transfers, the fleet consisted of the following aircraft registered with the Civil Aviation Authority:

British Midland International fleet
Aircraft	In service	Orders	Passengers			Notes
Aircraft	In service	Orders	J	Y	Total	Notes
Airbus A319-100	11	—	—	138	138	
Airbus A319-100	11	—	—	144	144	
Airbus A320-200	7	—	22	102	124	
Airbus A320-200	7	—	20	108	128	
Airbus A320-200	7	—	—	162	162	
Airbus A321-200	7	—	31	118	149	
Airbus A330-200	3	—	42	156	198	
Airbus A330-200	3	—	36	196	232	
Total	28	—				

=== Former fleet ===
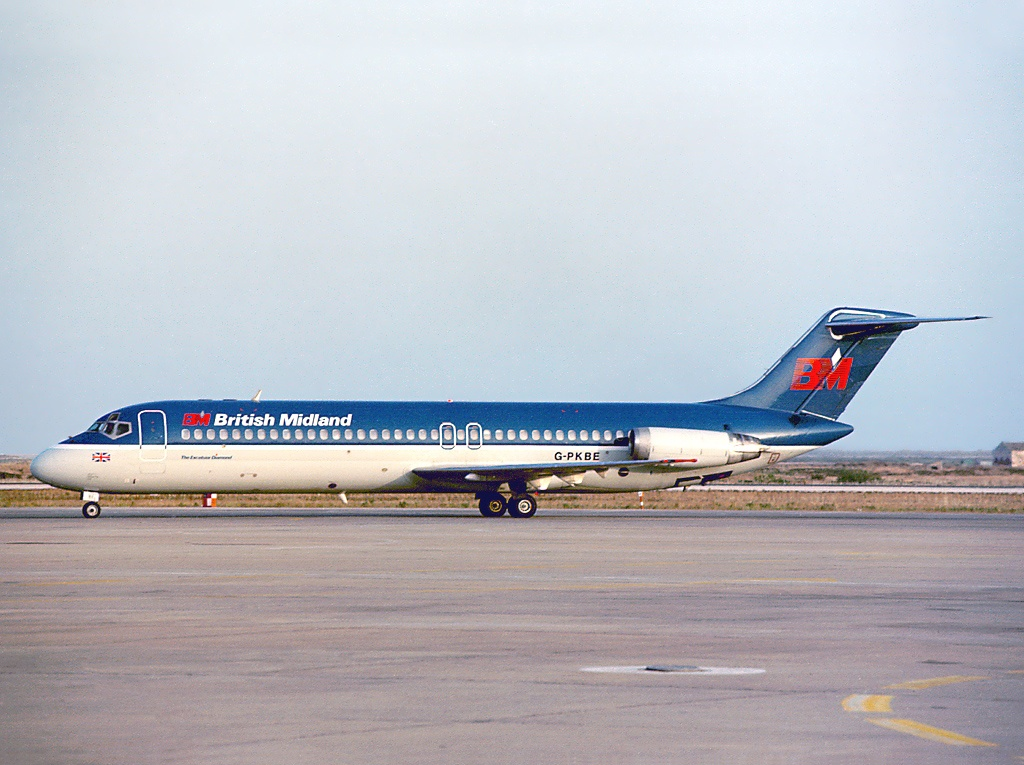
British Midland Douglas DC-9-32

BMI formerly operated the following aircraft types:

Aircraft	Total	Introduced	Retired	Notes
ATR 42-300	1	2004	2004	Leased from Air Atlantique
Airspeed Consul	1	1958	1963	
Auster Autocrat	2	1946	1966	
Avro Anson	3	1955	1965	
BAC One-Eleven Series 300AX	1	1984	1990	
BAC One-Eleven Series 500FJ	3	1970	1974	
British Aerospace ATP	3	1988	1993	
British Aerospace 146-200	6	1994	2003	
British Aerospace Jetstream 41	1	1994	1996	Leased from Manx Airlines
Beechcraft Baron	2	1981	2012	
Boeing 707-320	9	1970	1978	
Boeing 707-320C	4	1978	1986	
Boeing 737-200	3	1986	1988	
Boeing 737-300	13	1987	2003	
Boeing 737-400	8	1988	2003	One written off as Flight 92
Boeing 737-500	13	1993	2003	
Boeing 757-200	1	2005	2005	Leased form Loftleidir Icelandic
Boeing 757-200	3	2008	2011	Leased from Astraeus Airlines
Boeing 767-300ER	1	2007	2007	Leased from Arkefly
Canadair North Star	5	1961	1967	
de Havilland DH.89 Dragon Rapide	7	1948	1957	
de Havilland DH.104 Dove	1	1961	1962	
de Havilland Canada Dash 7	3	1990	1993	
Douglas C-47 Skytrain	8	1958	1969	
Douglas C-54 Skymaster	1	1969	1969	Leased from Invicta International Airlines
McDonnell Douglas DC-9-14	4	1983	1995	
McDonnell Douglas DC-9-15	5	1978	1995	
McDonnell Douglas DC-9-32	9	1984	1996	
Embraer ERJ-145	8	1999	2001	
Fokker F27 Friendship	17	1980	1990	
Fokker 70	3	1995	2002	Transferred to KLM Cityhopper
Fokker 100	6	1994	2005	
Handley Page Dart Herald	6	1965	1977	
Miles M.17 Monarch	2	1946	1953	
Miles M.57 Aerovan	1	1948	1951	
Miles M.60 Marathon	4	1955	1961	One used for spare parts only
Miles M.65 Gemini	1	1960	1961	
Saab 340	2	1994	1994	Leased from Skyways and Swedair
Saab 340	4	1995	1998	Operated by Business Air
Shorts 330	1	1981	1984	
Shorts 360	5	1983	1989	
Vickers Viscount 700	6	1969	1977	
Vickers Viscount 800	22	1967	1988	

== Incidents and accidents ==
- On 7 October 1961, Derby Aviation Douglas C-47B Dakota G-AMSW crashed into Mont Canigou in the French Pyrenees whilst operating a charter flight from Gatwick to Perpignan. All 34 passengers and crew were killed.

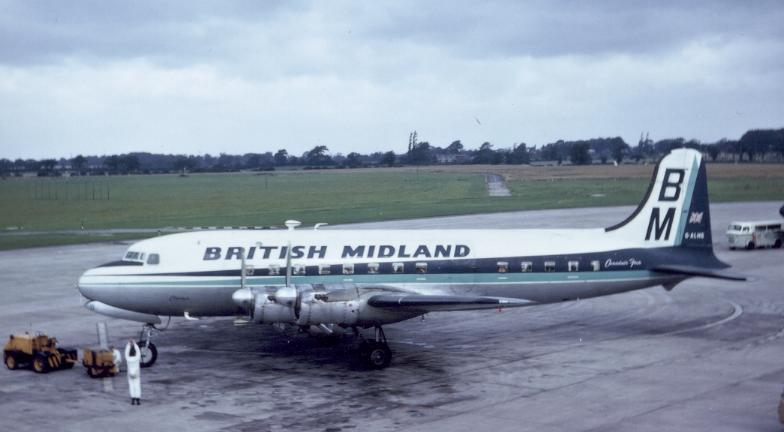
Canadair C-4 G-ALHG at Manchester Airport on 29 August 1965.

- The Stockport Air Disaster: a Canadair C-4 aircraft owned by British Midland Airways (registration G-ALHG) operating a holiday charter flight crashed near the centre of Stockport, Greater Manchester, on 4 June 1967. This accident, the deadliest in the airline's history, killed 72 of the 84 on board and seriously injured the 12 survivors; it also resulted in withdrawal of the type from the airline's fleet.
- On 20 February 1969, a Vickers Viscount (registration G-AODG) was damaged beyond economic repair when it landed short of the runway at East Midlands Airport. There were no casualties.
- On 20 March 1969, a Vickers Viscount (registration G-AVJA) crashed on takeoff at Ringway Airport, Manchester. Three of the four crew members on board were killed.
- On 22 January 1970, a Vickers Viscount (registration G-AWXI) was damaged beyond economic repair at London Heathrow Airport when an engine caught fire on takeoff. A successful emergency landing was made at Heathrow.
- On 18 January 1987, a Fokker F27 Friendship (registration G-BMAU) on a training flight crashed on approach to East Midlands Airport due to wing and tail surface icing. There were no fatalities.
- The Kegworth air disaster: on 8 January 1989, British Midland flight BD 092, a recently delivered Boeing 737-400 (registration G-OBME), crashed onto the embankment of the M1 motorway just short of the runway of East Midlands Airport, Leicestershire. Forty-seven of the 118 passengers lost their lives.
- On 24 August 2010, an Airbus A321-231 (registration G-MEDJ) en route from Khartoum to Beirut as flight BD996 suffered a serious electrical malfunction which caused the intermittent failure of the captain and co-pilot's electronic displays together with the uncommanded application of left rudder trim. The latter caused the aircraft to stray 20 nautical miles off course. The aircraft was cruising at 36,000 ft at the time, with both autopilot and autothrust engaged. The captain ultimately disengaged both and flew the aircraft manually, landing in Beirut without further mishap. Airbus indicated that an electrical power interruption had occurred which had caused a reset of the Flight Augmentation Computer (FAC). Such an event may cause a small incremental offset of the rudder trim, according to the aircraft manufacturer. The Air Accidents Investigations Board (AAIB) subsequently issued Safety Recommendation 2010–092, recommending that Airbus alert all operators of A320 series aircraft of the possibility that an electrical malfunction may not be clearly annunciated on the Electronic Centralised Aircraft Monitoring system (ECAM) and that such an event may lead to an uncommanded input of rudder trim.

== See also ==
- Air transport in the United Kingdom
- List of airports in the United Kingdom
- Transport in the United Kingdom
- List of defunct airlines of the United Kingdom
