= List of accidents and incidents involving the Bristol Freighter =

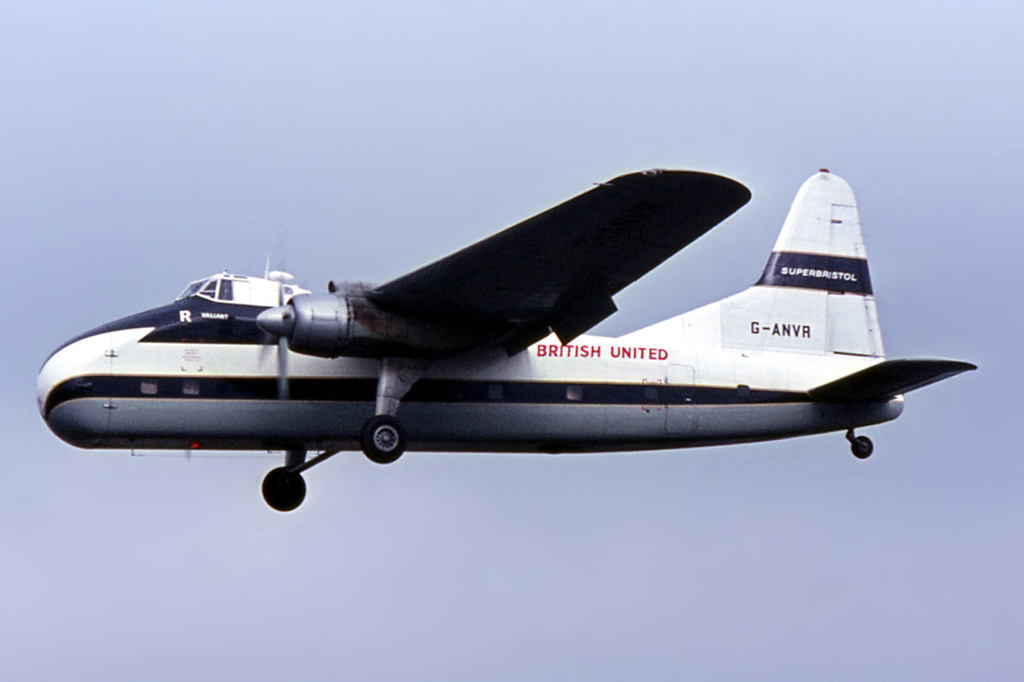
A Bristol Superfreighter Mk.32 of British United Airways

This is a list of accidents and incidents involving the Bristol Freighter, a twin-engined transport aircraft used as both a freighter and airliner as well as a troop transport and car ferry.

Sixty-eight of the 214 Freighters built were destroyed or damaged beyond economical repair in accidents. At least 45 of these were fatal, resulting in the deaths of at least 385 passengers and crew.

== 1940s ==
1946

- 4 July – Freighter IIA G-AHJB on delivery to REAL Transportes Aéreos of Brazil crashed into the sea 198 km east of Aracaju, Brazil. The crew were rescued by an American steamship.

1947

- 16 October – Freighter I F-BCJN Société Aérienne du Littoral crashed into the sea off Cartagena, Spain, 41 killed.
- 23 October – Bristol's company demonstrator Freighter IA G-AIMC, named "Merchant Venturer", was damaged beyond repair at Wau, New Guinea during a worldwide sales and demonstration tour. The aircraft, which was on charter to Qantas, was parked at the top of Wau's 1:12 gradient airstrip after landing when the park brake cable failed. "Merchant Venturer" rolled backwards down the runway and off the lower end into a deep ditch.
- 18 November – Freighter XI SE-BNG of AB Trafik-Turist-Transportflyg crashed into the Santa Marie del Monte mountain near Revello, Italy, 21 killed.

1948

- 25 January – Freighter 21E F-BCJA of Société Indochinoise de Transport Aériens disappeared on a flight from Cyprus to Iraq, five missing.
- 11 April – Freighter 21E F-BENG of Cie Air Transport crashed at Los Barrios, Algeciras, Spain, three killed.

1949

- 6 May – G-AIFF a Bristol Aeroplane Company Freighter Mark 31 crashed into the English Channel about 26 km from Portland Lighthouse following rudder over-balance causing structural failure of the fin, seven killed.
- 8 July – Freighter IA T-28 of the Argentine Air Force was damaged beyond repair, five killed.
- 6 August – Freighter 21 HC-SBU of the Shell Company of Ecuador crashed near Salasca Hill, Cordilleras, Ecuador, 34 killed.
- 24 November – Freighter 21E EC-ADK of Aviacion y Comercio was damaged beyond repair when it overshot the runway at Mahon Airport, Minorca.

== 1950s ==
1950

- 10 March – Freighter 21 F-BECR of Société Indochinoise de Transport Aériens crashed into high ground near Saigon, South Vietnam, four killed.
- 21 March – G-AHJJ a Bristol Aeroplane Company Freighter Mark 21 crashed near Cowbridge, Glamorgan after take-off from Llandow, four killed.
- 28 July – Freighter 21 F-BENF of Cie Air Transport crashed in the Sahara near Tanezrouft, Tunbukta, 26 killed.
- 5 October – Freighter 21 WH575 operated by the Bristol Aeroplane Company crashed on take off during a simulated engine failure when both engines were stopped, aircraft later re-built.

1951

- 27 July – Freighter 21E VR-NAX of West African Airways Corporation was damaged beyond repair when it landed short of the runway at Kaduna, Nigeria.
- 14 September – Freighter 21E G780 of the Royal Pakistan Air Force crashed.
- 25 September – Freighter IA T-37 of the Argentine Air Force crashed in Argentina, three killed.

1952

- 26 August – Wayfarer 21P G783 of the Royal Pakistan Air Force crashed near Khewra, Pakistan, 18 killed.
- 25 September – Wayfarer 21P G699 of the Royal Pakistan Air Force crashed near Lahore, Pakistan, two killed.

1953

- 19 January – G-AICM a Silver City Airways Freighter 21 crashed near Tempelhof Airport, West Berlin.
- 27 May – Freighter 31M NZ5908 of the Royal New Zealand Air Force crashed into high ground at Wither Hills near Blenheim, New Zealand, five killed.
- August – Freighter IA T-41 of the Argentine Air Force crashed.
- 11 November – Wayfarer 21P G809 of the Royal Pakistan Air Force crashed.
- 25 November – Freighter 21E A81-2 of the Royal Australian Air Force crashed after structural failure near Woomera, Australia, three killed.
- 4 December – Freighter 21 EC-AEG of Aviacion y Comercio crashed near Guaderrama mountains 132 km from Madrid, Spain, 23 killed.

1954

- 16 August – Freighter 21E F-VNAI of Air Vietnam crashed near Pakse, Laos, 47 killed.

1955

- 5 February – Freighter 21E VR-NAD of West African Airways Corporation crashed 94 km north west of Calabar, Nigeria, 13 killed.
- 17 September – Freighter 31 CF-GBT of Pacific Western Airlines was damaged beyond repair after a forced landing north of Thorhild, Alberta, Canada, two killed.
- 3 December – Freighter 31M 9696 of the Royal Canadian Air Force crashed at Marville, France, seven killed.

1956

- 13 February – Freighter 31 CF-FZU of Maritime Central Airways was damaged beyond repair during a take off from Baffin Island, Frobisher Bay, Canada, three killed.
- 30 May – Freighter 31 CF-TFZ of Pacific Western Airlines was damaged beyond repair at Beaver Lode Lake, Northwest Territories, Canada.
- 18 June – Freighter 31 CF-TFY of Transair was damaged beyond repair after it sank in 40 feet of water at Hudson Bay, Canada.
- November – F-OAUO of Air Laos was damaged beyond repair when it overshot the runway at Vientiane, Laos.
- 1 November – Freighter 31M S4413 of the Pakistan Air Force crashed.
- 10 December – NZ5901 of the Royal New Zealand Air Force crashed at Cameron Highlands, Malaya, eight killed.

1957

- 9 May – EC-ADI an Aviacion y Comercio, later Aviaco, Freighter 21 crashed on approach to Barajas near Madrid, Spain, 37 killed.
- 11 September – EC-AEH, a Freighter 21E of Aviacion y Comercia, was damaged beyond repair when landing at Tetuan, Morocco.
- 8 October – Freighter 21E HZ-AAC of Saudi Arabian Airlines was damaged beyond repair during landing at Turaif, Saudi Arabia.
- 21 November – Freighter 31 ZK-AYH of Straits Air Freight Express crashed and burned at Russley Golf Course, Christchurch, New Zealand, after it broke up in flight due to a severe gust of wind initiating the fatigue failure of the right wing. The wing failed at a bolt hole that had been drilled in its front spar during a modification meant to fix an existing fatigue problem in the wing. The four occupants were killed.

1958

- 27 February – Freighter 21E G-AICS of Manx Airlines crashed at Winter Hill, near Bolton, Lancashire, United Kingdom, 35 killed.
- 25 March – Freighter 21E HZ-AAB of Saudi Arabian Airlines was damaged beyond repair during a landing at Guriat airstrip in Saudi Arabia.
- 4 November – Freighter 31 F-BHVB of Cie Air Transport crashed on landing at Le Touqet, France.

1959

- 29 January – Freighter 31M S4426 of the Pakistan Air Force crashed near Chakala, Pakistan. seven killed.
- 15 March – Freighter 31 EC-ADH of Aviacion y Comercio was damaged beyond repair on landing at Mahon Airport, Minorca, one killed.
- November – Pakistan Air Force Mark 21P G778 was damaged beyond repair in a landing accident.
- November – Freighter 31M S4419 of the Pakistan Air Force crashed.

== 1960s ==
1961

- 1 November – Freighter 32 G-ANWL of Silver City Airways crashed in Guernsey, two killed.
- 18 December – VH-AAH of Pacific Aviation was damaged beyond repair while landing at Albion Park near Sydney, Australia.
- Freighter 31 S4415 of the Pakistan Air Force crashed on an unknown date.

1962

- 19 April – Freighter 31E EC-AHJ of Aviacion y Comercio was damaged beyond repair at Valencia, Spain.
- 30 June – Freighter 21 G-AGVC of Manx Airlines was damaged beyond repair when the landing gear collapsed during landing at Ronaldsway, Isle of Man.
- 26 July – S4414 of the Royal Pakistan Air Force crashed at Indus Valley, Pakistan.

1963

- 24 September – G-AMWA of British United Air Ferries crashed on take-off at Guernsey.
- 30 December – Freighter 31M 9697 of the Royal Canadian Air Force crashed on approach to Marville aerodrome, France, eight killed.

1967

- Freighter 31M 369 of the Iraqi Air Force was damaged beyond repair in a landing accident on an unknown date.
- 12 June – Freighter 31M EI-APM of Aer Turas crashed on landing at Dublin, Ireland, 2 killed.

1968

- 10 April – Freighter 31E ZK-CPU of SAFE Air was damaged beyond repair by a hurricane.

1969

- Freighter CF-UME of Northcoast Air Services broke through thin ice on Baker Lake, YT and was lost with no loss of life in the spring of 1969.
- 11 June – Freighter 32 F-BLHH of Cie Air Transport was damaged beyond repair at Le Touquet, France.
- 21 August – G775 of the Pakistan Air Force was damaged beyond repair.

== 1970s ==
- 3 May 1970 – Freighter 31M CF-WAG of Wardair was damaged beyond repair at Great Slave Lake near Snowdrift, Northwest Territories, Canada.
- 31 May 1974 – Freighter 31M CF-QWJ of Lambair entered a spiral dive and crashed at Rankin Inlet, Canada following an engine failure; two killed.
- 10 May 1975 – Freighter 21E VH-SJQ of Air Express crashed in Bass Strait off Cape Paterson 40 km south of Wonthaggi, Victoria, Australia following an engine failure; two killed.
- 20 November 1977 – Freighter 31M C-FWAD of Norcanair stalled and crashed at Hay River Airport, Canada; one killed.

== 1980s ==
- 14 January 1981 – Freighter 31E ZK-CAM of SAFE Air was damaged beyond repair while landing at Blenheim-Woodbourne Airport, New Zealand.
- 21 June 1988 – Freighter 31M C-GYQY of Trans-Provincial Airlines crashed on landing at Bronson Creek, 350 km north of Terrace, British Columbia, Canada.

== 1990s ==
- 18 July 1996 – Freighter 31 C-FDFC crashed on take off from Enstone Airfield, United Kingdom.
- 24 April 1997 – Freighter 31A C-FTPA damaged beyond repair landing at Bronson Creek Airport, Canada.
