= Channel Air Bridge =

1954–1962 British independent airline

- Bristol Freighter
| IATA | ICAO | Call sign |
|---|---|---|
| – | – | – |
- Founded: 1954
- Ceased operations: 1962
- Hubs: Southend Airport
- Alliance: Air Charter; Aviation Traders, Aviation Traders (Engineering)
- Fleet size: 11 aircraft
- Destinations: United Kingdom; Continental Europe
- Parent company: Airwork (1958–1960); Air Holdings (1961–1962)
- Headquarters: Central London
- Key people: D.A. Whybrow, H.E. Cross, G.P. Parselle, A.T. Pugh

Channel Air Bridge was a private British independent (Note: independent from government-owned corporations) airline specialising in cross-Channel vehicle-cum-passenger ferry services. Freddie Laker started Channel Air Bridge as a sister airline of Air Charter on a provisional basis in 1954. Operations commenced in 1955. In 1958, Channel Air Bridge took over Air Charter's vehicle ferry services. In 1959, both Channel Air Bridge and its sister airline Air Charter became part of the Airwork group. In 1960, Airwork joined with Hunting-Clan to form British United Airways (BUA). In 1962, BUA reorganised its vehicle ferry operations by merging Channel Air Bridge with Silver City Airways. This resulted in the creation of British United Air Ferries in 1963.

== History ==
Following Freddie Laker's creation of Air Charter ferry division in late 1954, the newly formed unit commenced regular scheduled vehicle and passenger ferry services in April 1955 with four Bristol Freighters shuttling seven times a day between Southend and Calais. The aircraft sported a red-and-white colour scheme. In that same year, the ferry division also took delivery of the first two of nine larger, "long-nosed" Bristol 170 Mark 32 Superfreighters. Eventually, it operated 24 daily round-trips between Southend and Calais and inaugurated additional vehicle/passenger ferry services from Southend to Ostend and Rotterdam. Southend—Ostend services were operated in partnership with Sabena.

By 1958, the air ferry unit was carrying almost 15,000 cars a year. A considerable proportion of this was traffic diverted from the Midlands, which would otherwise have used Silver City Airways, the original air ferry airline that had held a monopoly in this market prior to the arrival of the new competitor. 1958 was also the year Laker decided to transfer Air Charter's vehicle ferry services and Bristol 170 fleet to a so-called Channel Air Bridge, thus putting it solely in charge of this type of operation. During that year, Laker furthermore announced his decision to sell Air Charter and Aviation Traders to Airwork for £600,000 cash plus a further £200,000, subject to the valuation of stock. The deal became effective in January 1959, when all two companies joined the Airwork group. Channel Air Bridge Ltd. subsidiary was formally established on 25 February 1959.

Following a rationalisation of Air Charter's flight crew and ground staff in February 1959, Channel Air Bridge assumed Air Charter's vehicle ferry services while parent's remaining operations were subsequently absorbed into the newly formed BUA, as a result of the Airwork-Hunting-Clan merger in June 1960.

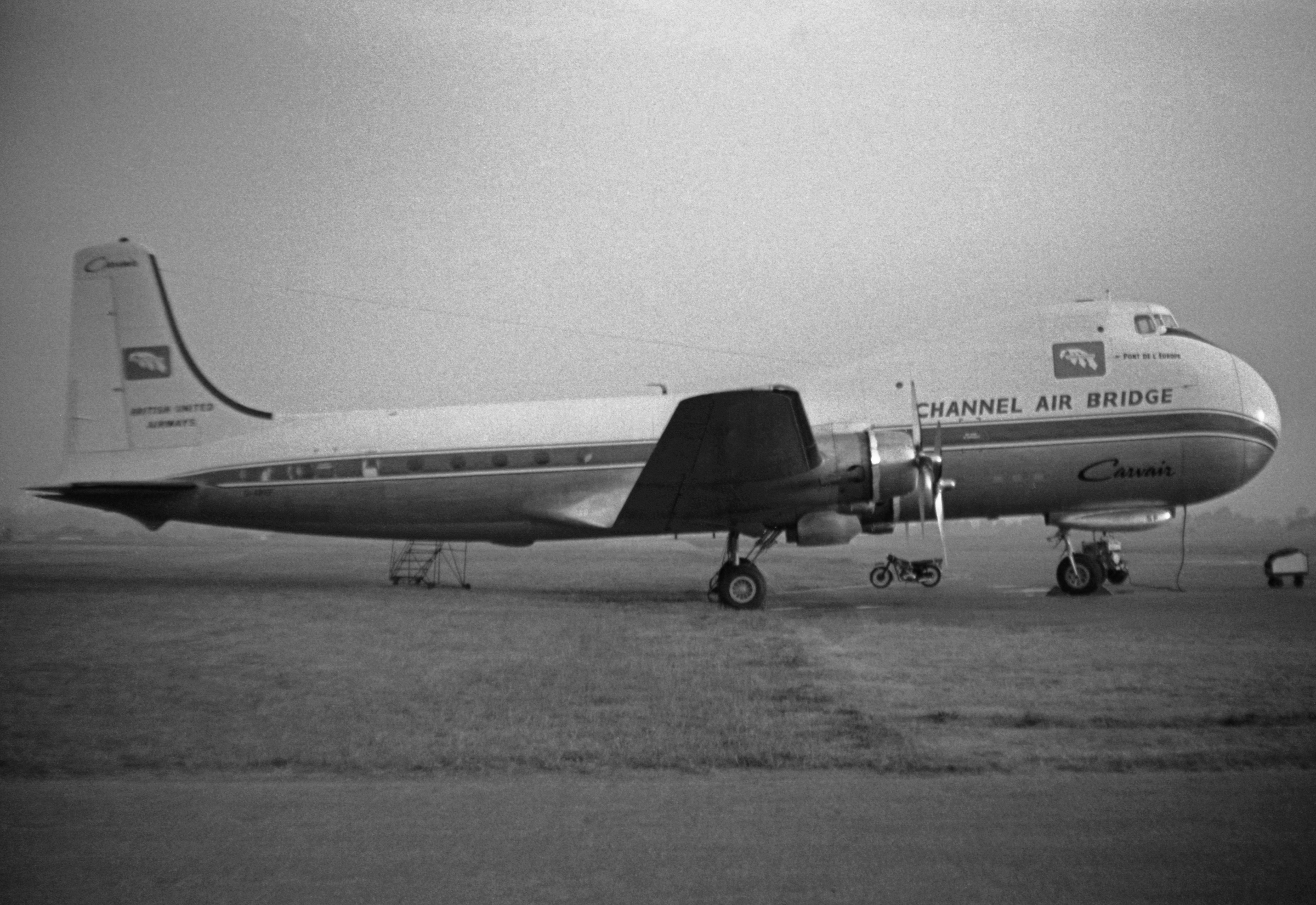
ATL-98 Carvair at Southend in July 1962

By 1962, Channel Air Bridge operated scheduled vehicle, passenger and freight ferry services from Southend to Calais, Ostend, Rotterdam, Basel, Geneva and Strasbourg. The longer routes to Switzerland and Strasbourg in France, as well as all Dutch routes, were operated with larger ATL-98 Carvairs while Bristol Freighters continued to ply the shorter routes to Calais and Ostend. Combined rail-air-rail services were provided between London and Brussels in conjunction with British Rail and Société Nationale des Chemins de fer Belges (SNCB/NMBS), the respective contemporary national railway companies of the UK and Belgium. In addition, the air carrier held British licences to operate scheduled air ferry services from Southend to Bremen, Düsseldorf and Lyon. These licences remained unused as a result of foreign government approval being withheld.

Channel Air Bridge continued to operate under its own name until it merged with Silver City Airways to form British United Air Ferries, operationally from mid-1962, formally from 1 January 1963. Channel Air Bridge employed 201 people at this time.

== Fleet ==
In April 1962, the Channel Air Bridge fleet comprised 11 aircraft.

| Aircraft | Number | Remarks |
|---|---|---|
| Aviation Traders ATL-98 Carvair | 2 | A further 8 Carvairs were on order. |
| Bristol 170 Superfreighter Mark 32 | 8 | |
| Bristol 170 Freighter Mark 31 | 1 | |
| Total | 11 | |

== Accidents and incidents ==
There is one recorded fatal accident involving a Channel Air Bridge aircraft. The accident occurred on 28 December 1962. It involved an Aviation Traders ATL-98 Carvair (registration: G-ARSF) operating an international scheduled passenger flight from Southend to Rotterdam. While the Carvair was making a visual approach to Rotterdam Airport in conditions of snow with 1,460m visibility, the landing gear struck a 6 feet high dyke, 800 ft short of the runway threshold. When the plane hit the ground 200 ft further on, it bounced heavily. This resulted in the right wing becoming partially detached from the fuselage and the aircraft rolling rapidly to the right. After sliding inverted for about 700 ft, the Carvair came to a halt.

This accident resulted in the death of one of the four crew members. All 14 passengers survived. Accident investigators established the fact that the commander carried out the final stage of approach below the normal glide path with insufficient engine power as the primary cause. This resulted in the speed of descent being too high in relation to the horizontal distance still to be covered to the beginning of the runway. As a result, the aircraft hit a dyke at a high vertical speed after facing the direction of the approach. The board of investigators furthermore concluded that the aircraft would still have hit the ground a considerable distance short of the runway threshold, possibly with less fatal consequences, even if there had been no dyke, which in this instance was not an obstruction of any significant height.

== See also ==
- Freddie Laker
- List of defunct airlines of the United Kingdom

== Notes ==
Notes

Citations
