= British United Air Ferries =

Car and passenger ferry airline of the United Kingdom (1963–2001)

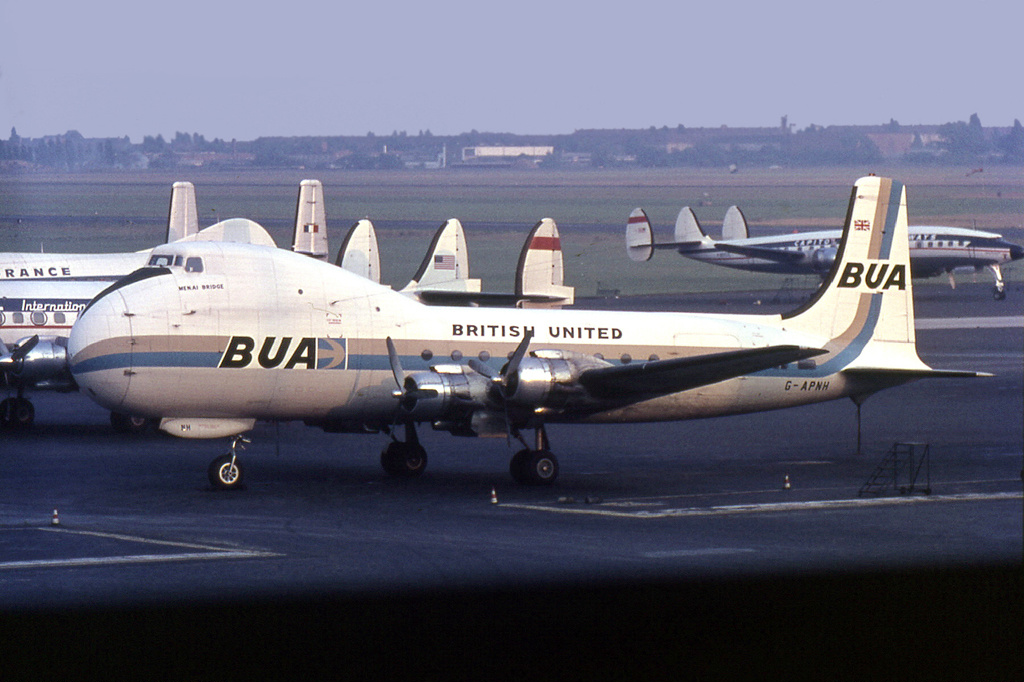
- BUAF Aviation Traders ATL 98 Carvair
IATA	ICAO	Call sign
VF	BAF	AIR FERRY
- Founded: 1 January 1963 (amalgamation)
- Ceased operations: 14 December 2001
- Hubs: Aberdeen; Bournemouth; London–Gatwick; London–Southend; London–Stansted; Lydd Ferryfield; Southampton; Sumburgh
- Fleet size: 23 piston airliners (9 Aviation Traders Carvair, 14 Bristol Superfreighter (as of September 1967))
- Destinations: Channel Islands; Continental Europe
- Parent company: Air Holdings (1967–1971); T.D. Keegan (1971–1972); Transmeridian Air Cargo (1972–1977); T.D. Keegan (1977–1983); Jadepoint (1983–1988); Mostjet (1989–1993); [British] World Aviation Group (1994–2001)
- Headquarters: Central London (1963–1967); London Southend Airport (1967–2001)
- Key people: Sir Miles Wyatt; F. A. Laker; Max Stuart-Shaw; Graham Kentsley; R.L. Cumming; A.F. Nickalls; D.J. Platt; T.D. Keegan; A.L. MacLeod; D. Willis; R. Pesskin; N. Skinner; A. Weiner; I.M. Herman; R. Pinnington; R. Sturman; N. Hansford; M.J. Sessions
- Website: british-world.co.uk

British United Air Ferries Ltd. (BUAF) was a wholly private, British independent (Note: independent from government-owned corporations) car and passenger ferry airline based in the United Kingdom during the 1960s. It specialised in cross-Channel ferry flights carrying cars and their owners between its numerous bases in Southern England, the Channel Islands and Continental Europe. All-passenger and all-cargo flights were operated as well. Following several identity and ownership changes, it went out of business in 2001. In its final years, as British World Airlines, its head office was at Viscount House, London Southend Airport.

== History ==
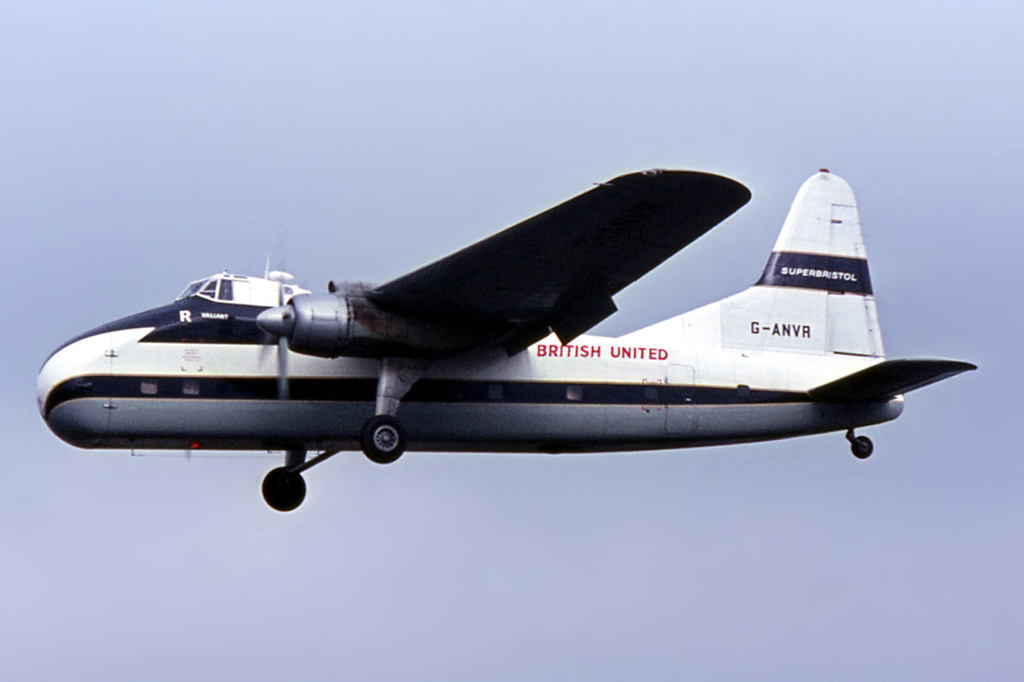
BUAF Bristol 170 Superfreighter Mark 32 Valiant in 1966

=== Establishment through a merger ===
BUAF came into being on 1 January 1963 as a result of the merger of Channel Air Bridge and Silver City Airways Air Ferry Division. The newly formed airline was a wholly owned subsidiary of Air Holdings, which in turn was a subsidiary of British & Commonwealth Holdings. This ownership structure made BUAF a sister airline of British United Airways, at the time Britain's biggest independent airline and the country's leading independent scheduled operator.

BUAF operated scheduled and non-scheduled vehicle ferry, passenger and freight services. This included scheduled routes from Southend, Lydd Ferryfield and Hurn to ten points in the Channel Islands and Continental Europe. Aviation Traders Carvairs operated what the airline called "deeper penetration" routes to Basel, Geneva and Strasbourg. Bristol Superfreighters plied the routes to Jersey, Guernsey, Cherbourg, Le Touquet, Calais, Ostend and Rotterdam.

The airline's scheduled services between the UK, Le Touquet and Ostend formed part of rail-air operations linking the respective capital cities at each end. These were operated in conjunction with SNCF and NMBS, the respective national railway companies of France and Belgium. (Amongst these, was a six-times daily Southend—Ostend vehicle ferry service operated in conjunction with erstwhile Belgian flag carrier Sabena. This service, which had been launched by Air Charter in partnership with Sabena in 1957 with three dedicated Bristol Superfreighters in full Sabena livery and which BUAF had inherited from Channel Air Bridge, continued until 1964.) Coach-air services were provided in conjunction with local coach operators between the UK, France, Belgium, the Netherlands and Switzerland via Calais, Ostend, Rotterdam and Baswl.

In addition, all-passenger configured Bristol Freighters/Superfreighters were used for inclusive tour work on behalf of BUA (Services) Ltd. Sister airline BUA (C.I.) assumed the former Silver City routes linking the North of England with the Channel Isles and the Continent.

BUAF subsequently added routes linking Southampton with Rotterdam, Ostend, Calais, Deauville, Le Touquet, Jersey, Guernsey, Dinard and Cherbourg to its scheduled route network, while discontinuing its "deeper penetration" routes to Basel, Geneva and Strasbourg as these generated insufficient traffic to sustain a viable operation. Some of the new Southampton routes were part of rail-air operations in conjunction with the French and Belgian national railway companies as well.

=== British Air Ferries (BAF) ===
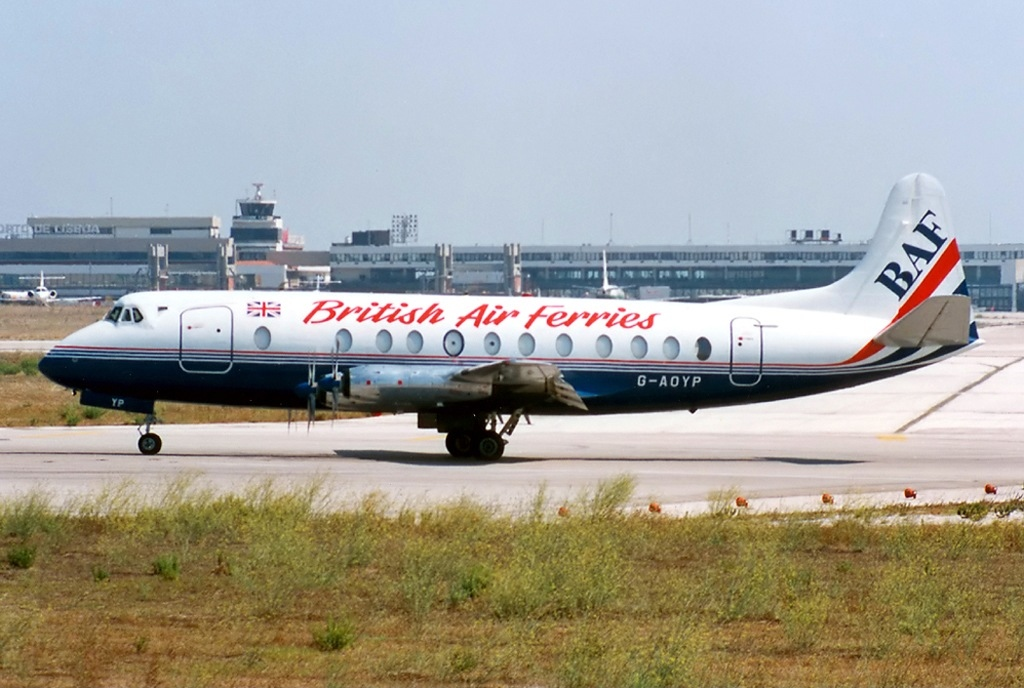
Vickers Viscount 800

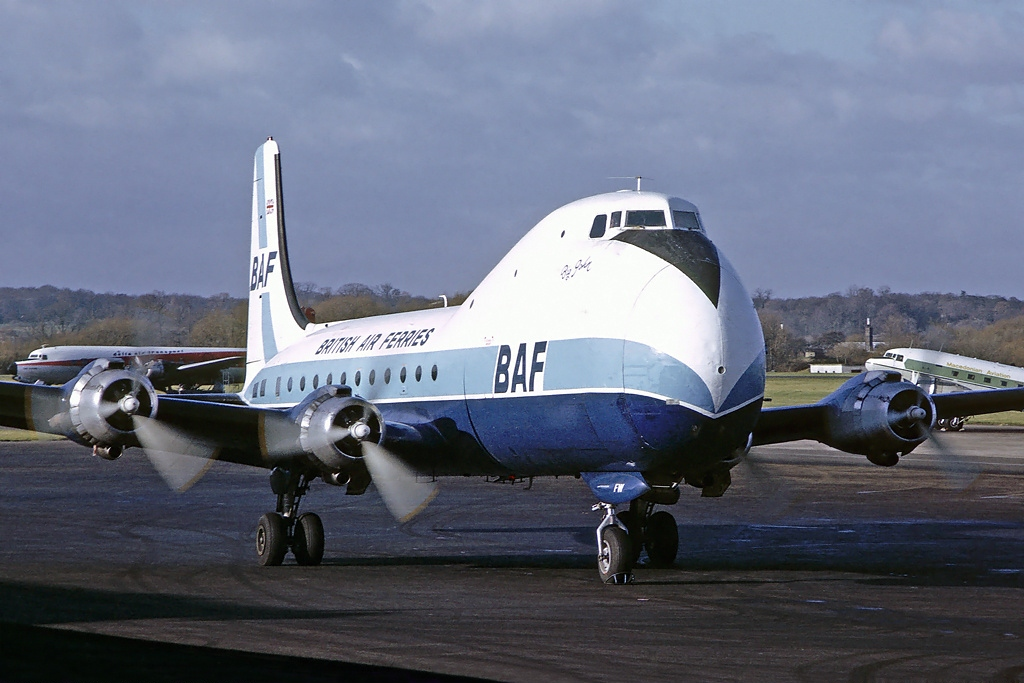
Aviation Traders ATL 98 Carvair

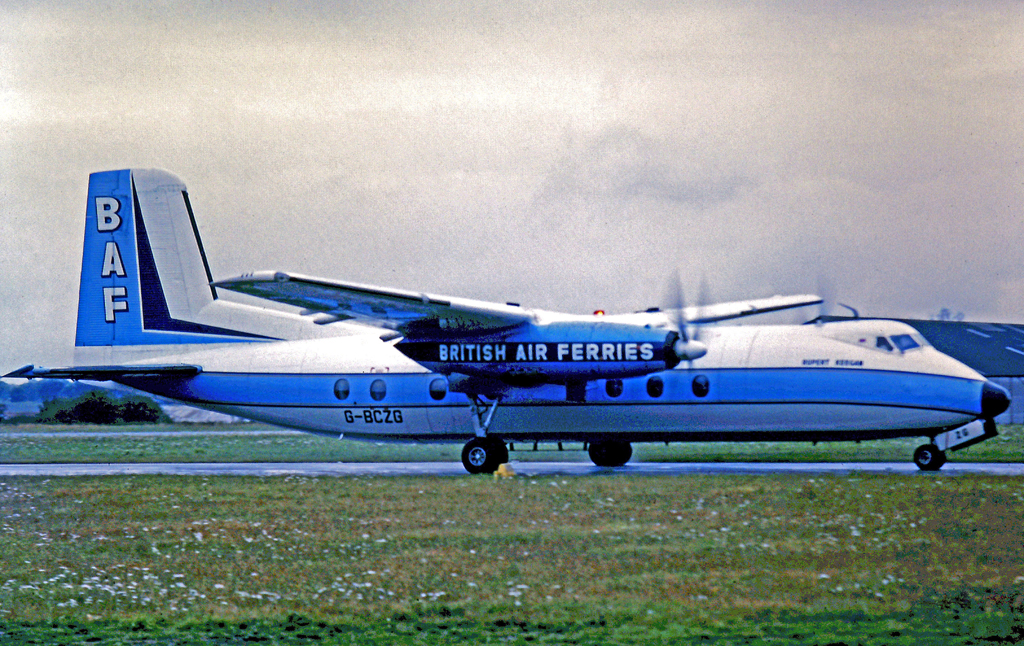
Handley Page Dart Herald operating a service from Southend Airport in 1976

As a consequence of B&C's reorganisation of the BUA group of companies during 1967/8, BUAF changed its name to British Air Ferries Ltd. (BAF) on 1 October 1967.

In October 1971, BAF's ownership passed from Air Holdings to the Keegan family, owners of Transmeridian Air Cargo (TMAC). Consequentially, in 1972, BAF became a wholly owned subsidiary of Transmeridian Air Cargo (TMAC), a Stansted-based all-cargo airline controlled by the Keegan family.

In 1975, BAF began replacing its remaining Carvairs with Handley Page Dart Herald turboprops on its cross-Channel routes linking Southend with Le Touquet, Ostend and Rotterdam. This resulted in these services being converted into ordinary passenger schedules and the Carvairs being transferred to cargo flying.

On 1 January 1977, BAF operated its last car ferry service. Later the same year, on 31 October, BAF Herald G-BDFE operating the airline's inaugural scheduled passenger flight from Southend to Düsseldorf under the command of Captain Caroline Frost and First Officer Lesley Hardy became Britain's first airliner flown by an all-female crew.

On 1 January 1979, BAF transferred its entire scheduled operation including associated aircraft and staff to British Island Airways (BIA).

Following British Airways's decision to withdraw from its loss-making regional routes and to retire its Vickers Viscount turboprop fleet, BAF acquired the entire 18-strong fleet along with the spares inventory during the early 1980s. This acquisition made it the world's largest Viscount operator at the time.

As a result of the changes the airline underwent in the late 1970s and early 1980s, BAF mainly concentrated on leasing, charter and oil industry support work.

In 1983, the Keegans put some of their businesses into receivership and in March of that year, sold the British Air Ferries name along with the airline's commercial flying operations to the Jadepoint investment group for £2m. On the other hand, this meant the direct management of two airlines: the regional Guernsey Airlines (from August 1983) and the charter Jersey Air Ferries, which however lasted only a few months (August-October 1983). In the spring of the same year, some scheduled services were also reactivated, which would last until the beginning of 1988. In the two-year period 1986-1986 BAF also operated some services under the British Caledonian Commuter brand under the name Tulip Express.

Growing financial difficulties at Jadepoint resulted in BAF being placed in administration in January 1988. A new holding company, called Mostjet, was formed within a year to enable the airline to emerge from administration in May 1989, the only British airline to do so at the time. At the same time, the charter airline Baltic Airlines, which had been established just over a year earlier, was absorbed.

=== British World Airlines (BWA) ===

On 6 April 1993, BAF was renamed British World Airlines Ltd. (BWA), ICAO code BWL.

Following delivery of BWA's first ATR 72 on 1 April 1996, the airline converted its three remaining passenger-configured Viscounts to freighters. On 18 April the same year, BWA Viscount G-APEY operated the type's last passenger flight, marking the 43rd anniversary of the Viscount's entry into full commercial air service with British European Airways (BEA).

BWA ceased trading on 14 December 2001, as a result of the tough business climate during the post-9/11 downturn.

== Fleet ==
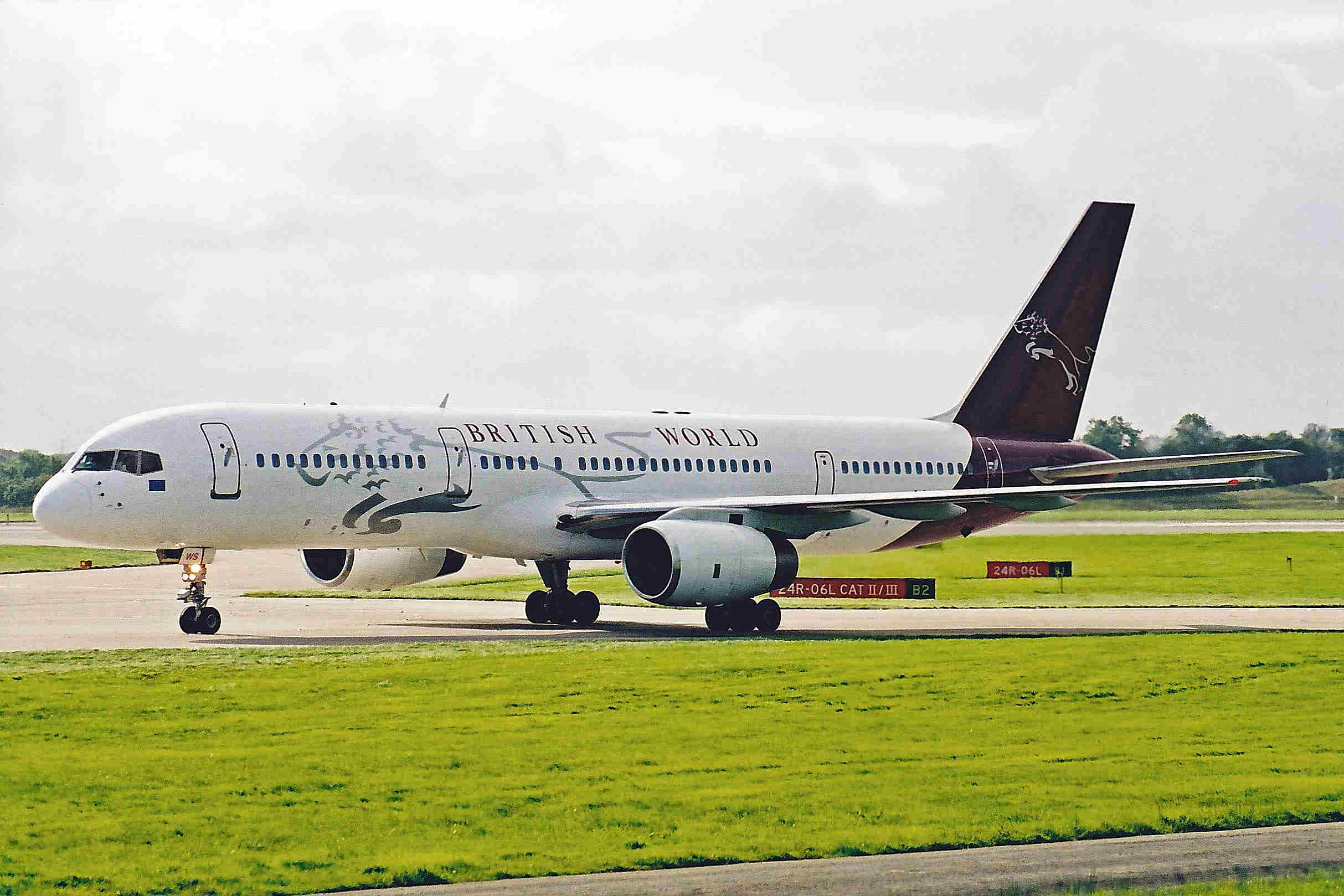
Boeing 757-200

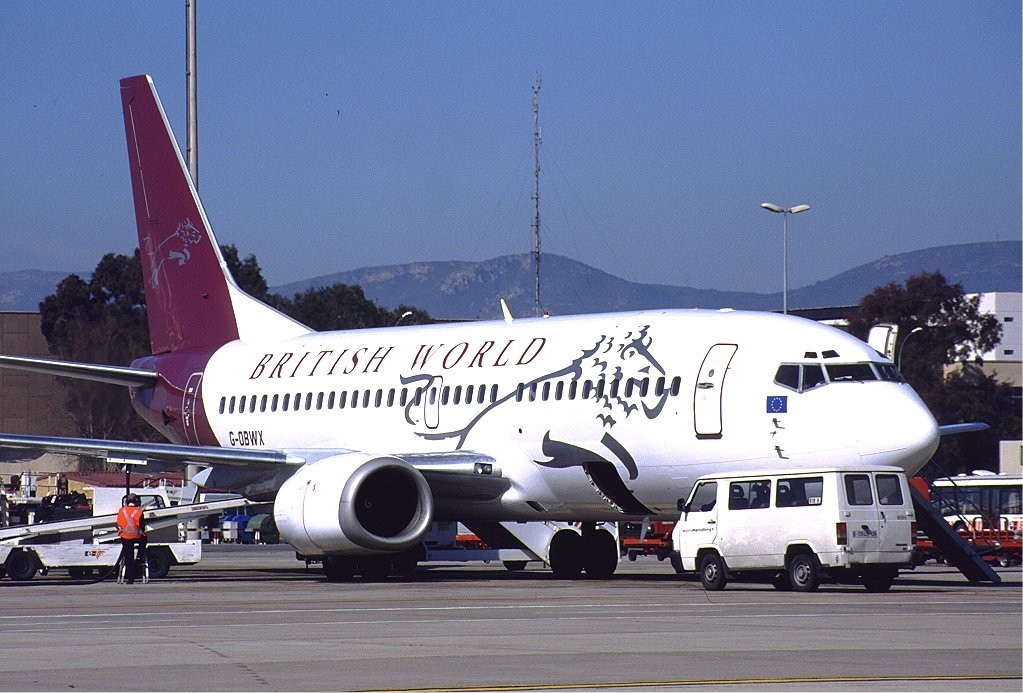
Boeing 737-300

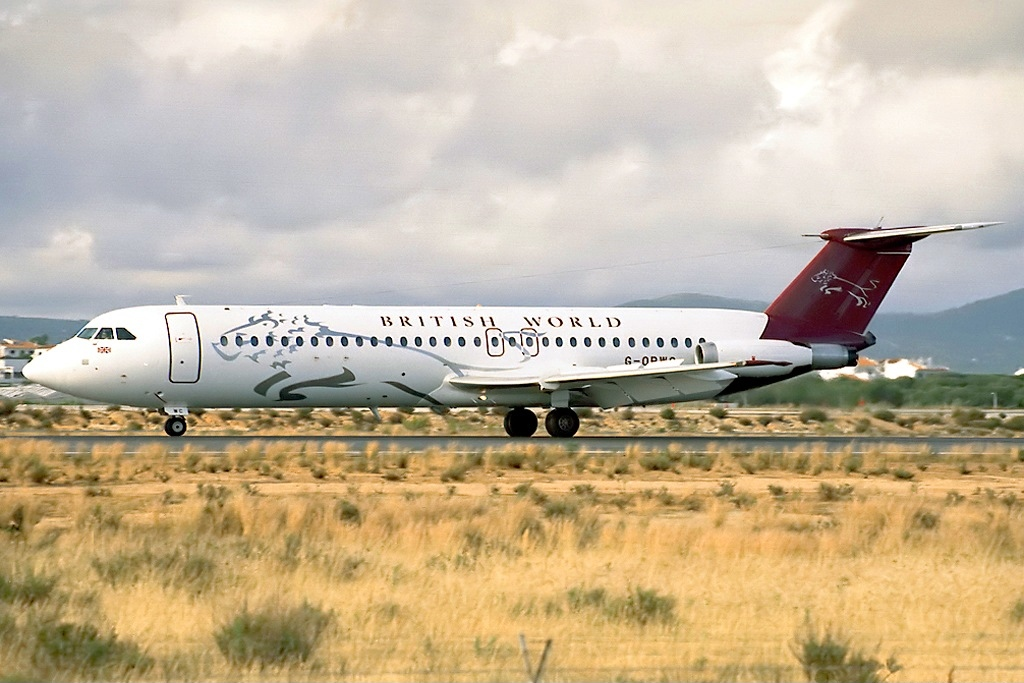
BAC One-Eleven 500

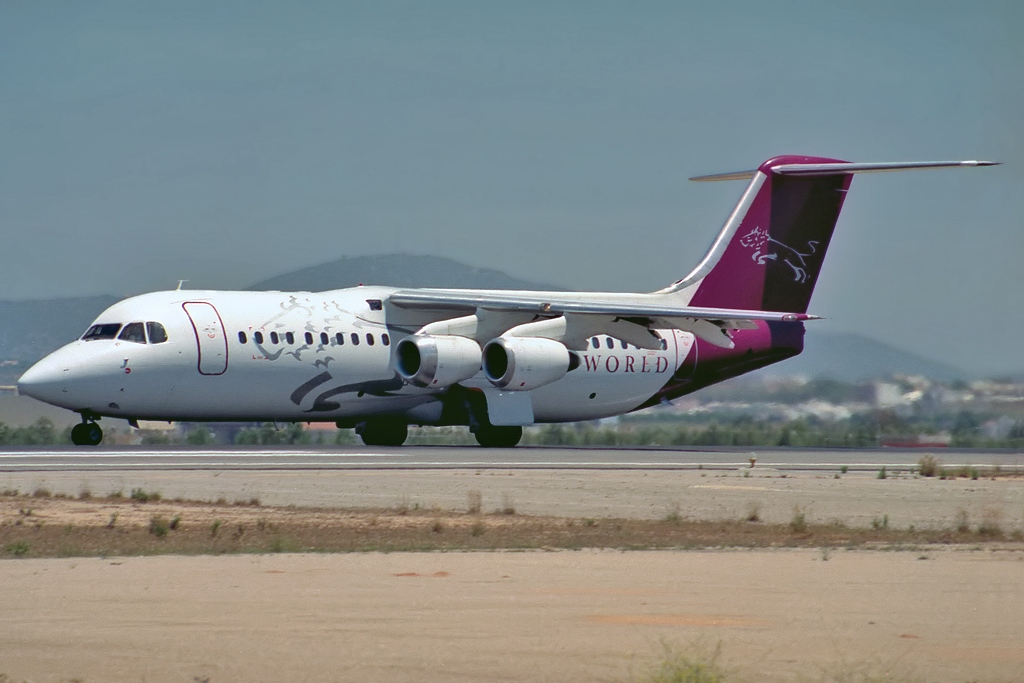
BAe 146-100

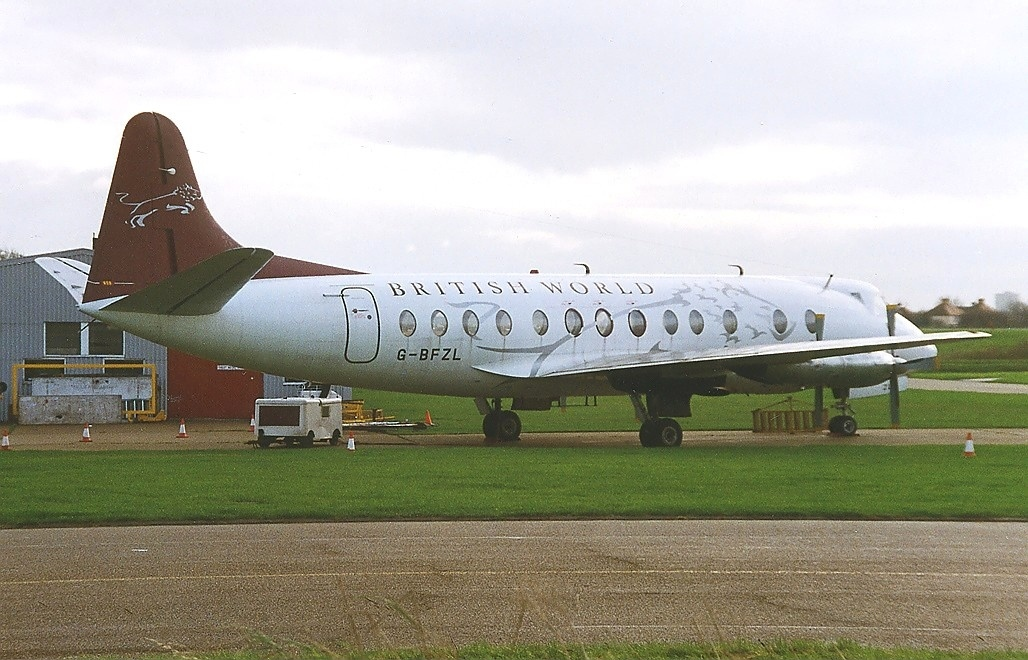
Vickers Viscount 800

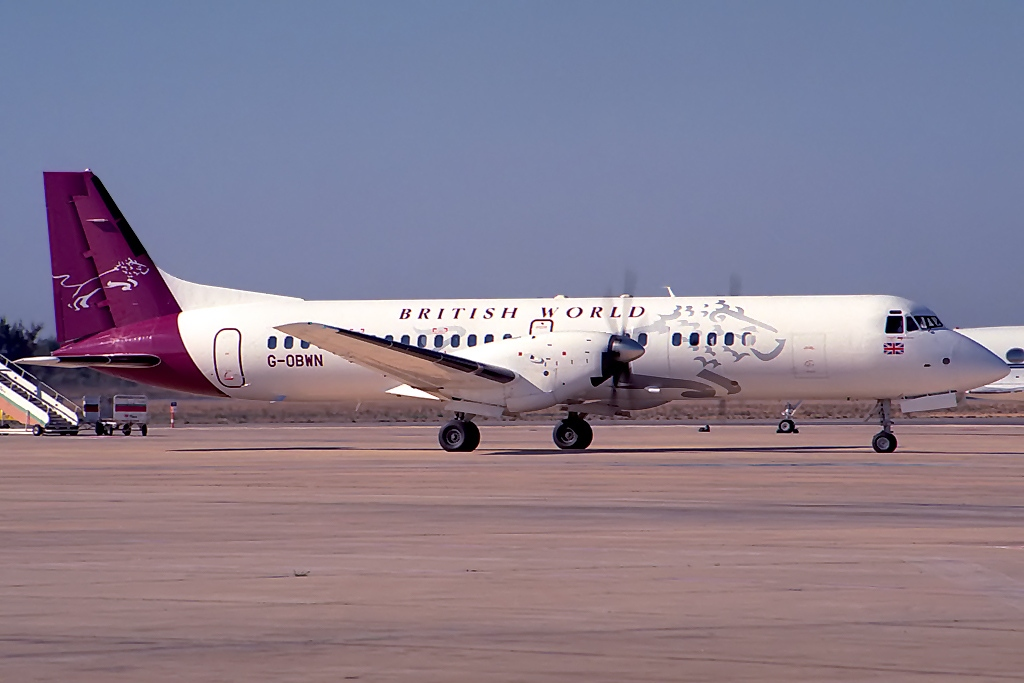
BAe ATP

BUAF/BAF/BWA operated the following aircraft types:

- Aviation Traders ATL 98 Carvair (BUAF/BAF)
- ATR 72-200 (BWA)
- BAC One-Eleven 200 (BAF)
- BAC One-Eleven 500 (BWA)
- BAe ATP (BWA)
- BAe 146-100 (BAF)/200 (BAF)/300 (BWA)
- Bristol 170 Freighter Mark 21E (BUAF)
- Bristol 170 Freighter Mark 31 (BUAF)
- Bristol 170 Superfreighter Mark 32 (BUAF/BAF)
- Boeing 727-200 (BAF)
- Boeing 737-300 (BWA)
- Boeing 757-200 (BWA)
- British Aerospace ATP (BWA)
- British Aerospace 146-300 (BWA)
- Canadair CL-44 (BAF)
- Fokker F-27 600 (BAF)
- Handley Page Dart Herald 200 (BAF)
- Hawker Siddeley HS 125 (BAF)
- McDonnell-Douglas MD-80 (BAF)
- Shorts 330 (BAF)
- Shorts 360 (BAF)
- Vickers Viscount 800 (BAF/BWA).

=== Hovercraft ===
- Vickers-Armstrongs VA-3 (BAF)

In BUAF's days, all aircraft were given individual names.

=== Fleet in 1963 ===
In April 1963, the fleet comprised 28 aircraft.

British United Air Ferries fleet in April 1963
Aircraft	Number
Aviation Traders ATL 98 Carvair	3
Bristol 170 Superfreighter Mark 32	21
Bristol 170 Freighter Mark 31	1
Bristol 170 Freighter Mark 21E	3
Total	28

BUAF employed 519 people at this time.

=== Fleet in 1967 ===
In September 1967, the fleet comprised 23 aircraft.

British United Air Ferries fleet in September 1967
Aircraft	Number
Aviation Traders ATL 98 Carvair	9
Bristol 170 Superfreighter Mark 32	14
Total	23

BUAF employed 633 people at this time.

=== Fleet in 1972 ===
In May 1972, the fleet comprised eight aircraft.

British Air Ferries fleet in May 1972
Aircraft	Number
Canadair CL-44	3
Aviation Traders ATL 98 Carvair	5
Total	8

BAF employed 300 people at this time.

=== Fleet in 1978 ===
In April 1978, the fleet comprised eighteen aircraft.

British Air Ferries fleet in April 1978
Aircraft	Number
Aviation Traders ATL 98 Carvair	2
Handley Page Dart Herald 200	16
Total	18

BAF employed 450 people at this time.

=== Fleet in 1984 ===
In March 1984, the fleet comprised ten aircraft.

British Air Ferries fleet in March 1984
Aircraft	Number
Vickers Viscount 800	8
Handley Page Dart Herald 200	2
Total	10

BAF employed 165 people at this time.

=== Fleet in 1990 ===
In March 1990, the fleet comprised 22 aircraft.

British Air Ferries fleet in March 1990
Aircraft	Number
BAC One-Eleven 200	3
Vickers Viscount 810	5
Vickers Viscount 806	10
Handley Page Dart Herald 200	3
Fokker F-27 600	1
Total	22

BAF employed 450 people at this time.

=== Fleet in 1994 ===
In March 1994, the fleet comprised eighteen aircraft.

British World Airlines fleet in March 1994
Aircraft	Number
BAe 146–300	2
BAC One-Eleven 500	6
Vickers Viscount 800	10
Total	18

The BWA group employed 400 people at this time.

=== Fleet in 1998 ===
In March 1998, the fleet comprised nine aircraft.

British World Airlines fleet in March 1998
Aircraft	Number
BAC One-Eleven 500	5
BAe ATP	2
ATR 72–210	2
Total	9

BWA employed 222 people at this time.

=== Fleet in 2001 ===
In December 2001, the fleet comprised fifteen aircraft.

British World Airlines fleet in March 2001
Aircraft	Number
Boeing 757-200	1
Boeing 737-300	3
BAC One-Eleven 500	3
BAe ATP	6
ATR 72–210	2
Total	15

== Accidents and incidents ==
During the early part of its existence, when the airline was British United Air Ferries, it suffered one non-fatal incident.

On 24 September 1963, a Bristol 170 Superfreighter Mark 32 (registration: G-AMWA) was damaged beyond repair in a takeoff accident at Guernsey Airport.

Operating a scheduled passenger flight to Bournemouth, the Bristol 170 was preparing for takeoff from Guernsey Airport's runway 28. The first officer, who was flying the aircraft used full power to counteract the effects of a 17 kn (20 mph) crosswind. Due to a problem with the port engine the First officer decided to abort takeoff as speed approached 80 knots. As the aircraft was going to overshoot the end of the runway he steered it to the left to avoid hitting obstacles. The aircraft became airborne for a short distance, crashing through the airport boundary fence, crossing a public road and coming to a halt a quarter of a mile from the runway end. Although the aircraft was a complete write-off, there were no fatalities among the four occupants (three crew and one passenger).

The accident investigators established the probable cause of the accident as the inability of the pilot in command to bring the aircraft to a stop within the remaining runway length, following his decision to abandon the takeoff due to a malfunction of the port engine, .

The company suffered two non-fatal incidents in the British Air Ferries years.

Vickers Viscount 806 G-APIM Viscount Stephen Piercey, (Note: named after Flight International magazine's former staff photographer Stephen Piercey who died on 20 May 1984 in a mid-air collision during an assignment at the Hanover Air Show) was hit on 11 January 1988 by a Fairflight Shorts 330 (registration: G-BHWT), which had suffered a nosegear brake and steering failure while preparing to take off from Southend Airport to Fairflight's Biggin Hill base. The collision destroyed the left-hand side of the Viscount's nose. Although the aircraft was deemed damaged beyond economical repair, it was subsequently restored and put on display at the Brooklands Museum.

The final two recorded incidents occurred during the British World years. One of these involved fatalities.

On 25 February 1994, a BWA Vickers Viscount 813 (registration: G-OHOT) operating an all-cargo flight from Edinburgh to Coventry encountered severe icing conditions en route. This caused the no. 2 engine to fail and its propeller to autofeather while the aircraft had begun its descent from flight level (FL) 150. During that time, the no. 3 engine started losing power as well. In response air traffic control immediately cleared the flightdeck crew to descend to FL070 and thereafter, FL050. The crew attempted to restart the no. 2 and 3 engines but when this proved futile, they elected to divert to Birmingham. The crew did manage to restart the no. 2 engine but this was followed by failure of no. 4. Five minutes short of Birmingham, the aircraft lost all electrical power and as a result radio navigation and intercom. The aircraft struck trees on 7.5 km (4.7 mi) southwest of Uttoxeter, causing it to break up and kill one of the two pilots.

The official accident investigation report of the UK's Air Accidents Investigation Branch (AAIB) identified the several factors as the likely cause:

1. Multiple engine failures were a consequence of extreme icing conditions.
2. The flightdeck crew's failure to complete the emergency drills as a result of not referring to the emergency checklist prejudiced their chances of restarting the engines successfully.
3. The crew's actions to secure and restart the failed engines, which did not comply with the operator's procedures, restricted the power that was available.
4. The drag induced by the failed engines' unfeathered propellers and the weight increase suffered by the heavily iced airframe caused a loss of height and control before reaching the diversion airfield.
5. The crew had no contingency plan to avoid the forecast severe icing conditions and was unaware of the relative position of a closer diversion airfield that could have been chosen by using ATC services more effectively. This constituted poor crew resource management, which reduced the potential for emergency planning, decision making and workload sharing.

== See also ==
- List of defunct airlines of the United Kingdom

== Notes ==
Notes

Citations
