= Aviation Traders Carvair =

Transport aircraft

ATL-98 Carvair
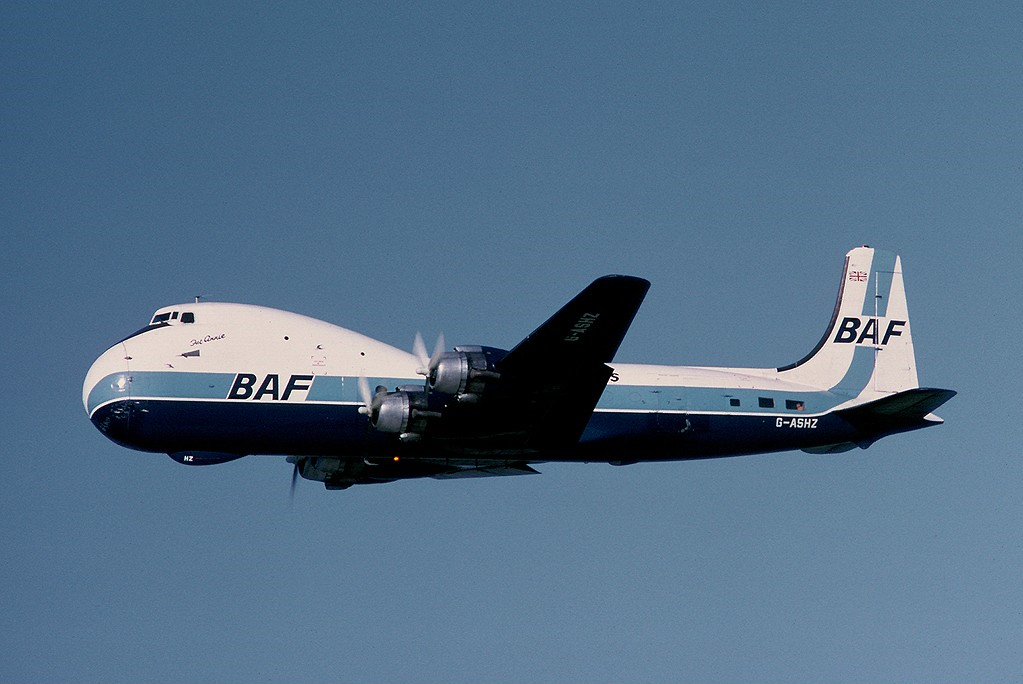
- Aviation Traders ATL-98 Carvair, British Air Ferries, 1975

General information
- Type: Transport
- Manufacturer: Aviation Traders
- Status: Retired from service
- Number built: 21 conversions

History
- Introduction date: 16 February 1962 with Channel Air Bridge
- First flight: 21 June 1961
- Developed from: Douglas DC-4

The Aviation Traders ATL-98 Carvair is a retired air ferry conversion developed by Freddie Laker's Aviation Traders (Engineering) Limited (ATL). Based on the Douglas DC-4, it has a capacity of 22 passengers in a rear cabin, and five cars loaded in at the front. It is powered by four radial engines.

== Design and development ==
Freddie Laker's idea to convert surplus examples of the Douglas DC-4 and its military counterpart the C-54 Skymaster to carry cars was a relatively inexpensive solution to develop a successor to the rapidly aging and increasingly inadequate Bristol 170 Freighter, the car ferry airlines' mainstay since the late 1940s.

The Bristol Freighter's main drawback was its limited car payload: even the "long-nosed" Mark 32 was able to accommodate only three cars, in addition to 20 passengers. This made carrying cars by air a very risky business: if a booked car did not arrive for the flight, the one-third cut in payload made the flight unprofitable. This was made worse by the increasing average length of British cars during the 1950s: the average UK car in 1959 was 25 centimetres (9.8 in) longer than in 1950. The extreme seasonality of the car ferry business furthermore resulted in poor aircraft utilization outside peak periods. Moreover, repeated takeoffs and landings on short cross-Channel flights, in turbulent air at lower altitudes with tight turnarounds of as little as 20 minutes, made the aircraft prone to structural fatigue problems, necessitating rigorous and costly modification programmes, further increasing the type's operating costs on low-yield routes.

When the major airlines replaced their obsolete piston airliners with new Boeing 707 and Douglas DC-8 jets on their prestige long-haul routes, the unit price of second-hand DC-4s dropped to as little as £50,000 (equivalent to £1 million today). The conversion of each of these airframes into car-passenger carriers cost about £80,000 (£1.6 million today). This was easily affordable by smaller airlines, such as the car ferry companies. Freddie Laker's cardboard model of a converted DC-4 featuring a door in the nose and a flight deck raised above the fuselage had shown that its payload was superior to the Bristol Freighter/Superfreighter. The aircraft conversion was designed to accommodate five average-sized British cars plus 25 passengers in the DC-4's longer and wider fuselage. British Air Ferries (BAF), for example, operated its Carvairs in a flexible configuration, either accommodating five cars and 22 passengers or two-three cars and 55 passengers, changeable from one configuration to the other in about 40 minutes. In addition, the DC-4's lack of pressurisation was suitable for low-altitude cross-Channel flights, making the proposed structural conversion straightforward. The result was a new aircraft christened Carvair (derived from car-via-air).

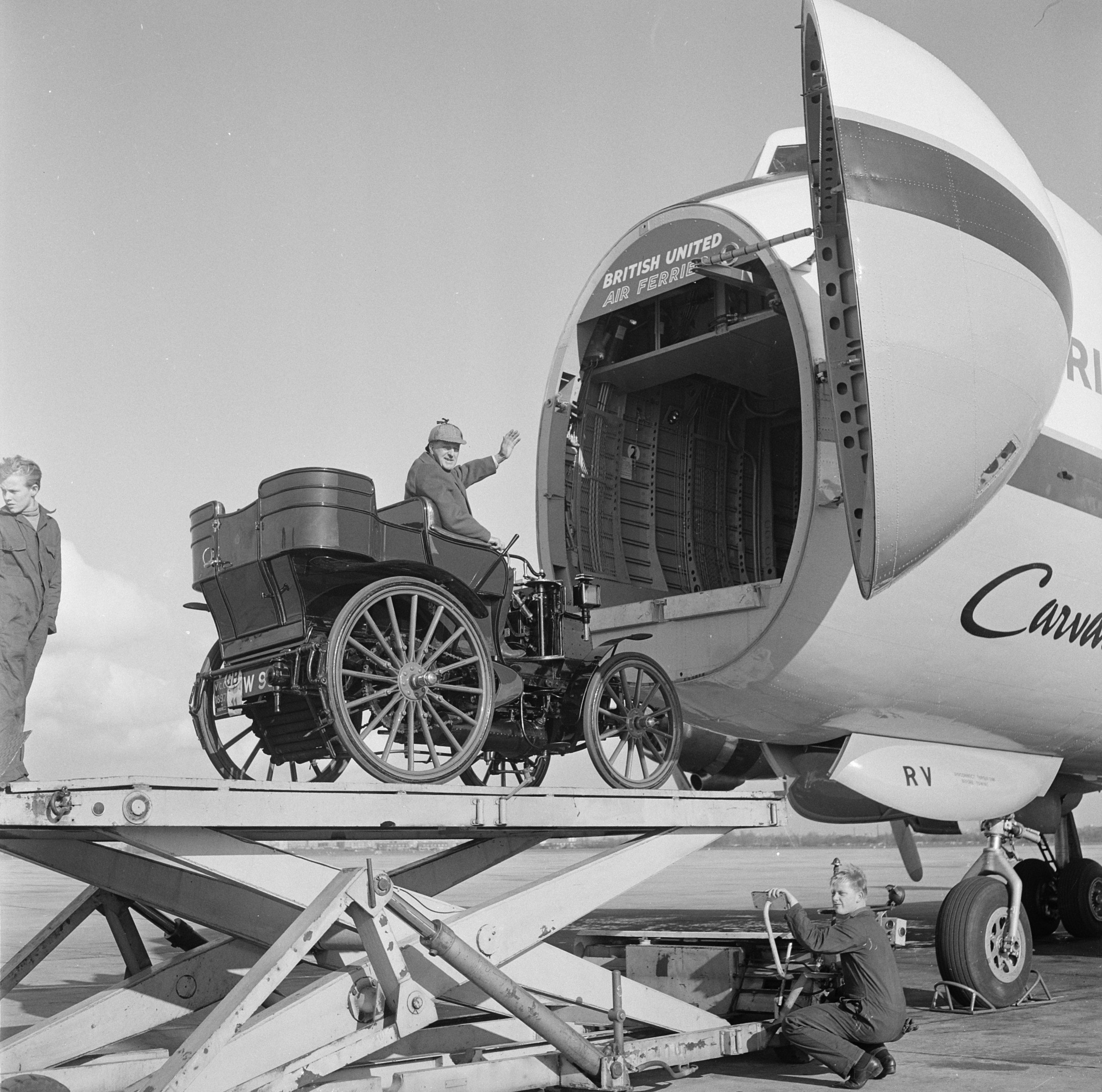
A publicity photo of a vintage 1897 Daimler car being loaded via scissor-lift onto a Carvair, 1966

Initially, it was thought that second-hand, pressurised Douglas DC-6 and Douglas DC-7 airframes could be converted into larger, "second generation" Carvairs within 15 years of the original DC-4-based Carvair's entry into service.

The conversion of the original DC-4 entailed replacing the forward fuselage with one 8 feet 8 inches (2.64 m) longer, with a flight deck raised into a bulbous "hump" like the later Boeing 747 jet, to allow a sideways-hinged nose door. It also required more powerful wheel brakes and an enlarged tail, often thought to be a Douglas DC-7 unit, but actually a completely new design. The engines, four Pratt & Whitney R-2000 Twin Wasps, were unchanged.

The prototype conversion first flew on 21 June 1961. Twenty-one Carvairs were produced in the UK, with production of aircraft 1, 11 and 21 at Southend Airport and the others at Stansted Airport. The final three aircraft were delivered to Australia's Ansett-ANA, which supplied its own DC-4s to ATL for conversion, unlike the previous 18 aircraft that were purchased by ATL and either sold on or transferred to associate company British United Air Ferries (BUAF). One of the two aircraft still flying in June 2007 was an ex-Ansett airframe. A second Ansett aircraft was abandoned at Phnom Penh in 1975. The first flight of the last conversion, number 21, for Ansett, was on 12 July 1968.

Basic price for a Carvair newly converted from a C-54 airframe (two of the three Ansett airframes supplied were of the DC-4 variant) in 1960 was £150,000, equivalent to £3 million today.

== Operational history ==
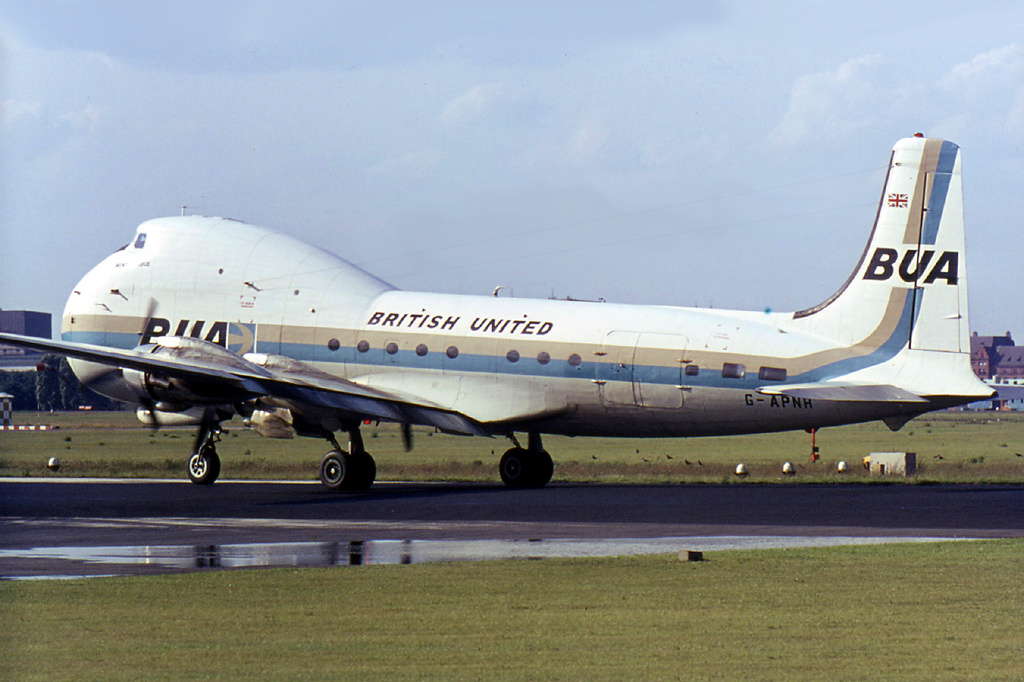
Aviation Traders ATL-98 Carvair, British United (BUA), 1967

The Carvair was used by Aer Lingus, BUA/BUAF and BAF among others, and was used in Congo-Kinshasa during 1962–1963, under contract to the United Nations. Aircraft for Aer Lingus were quickly convertible between 55 seats, and 22 seats with five cars. Some aircraft were pure freighters with only nine seats. One aircraft had 55 high-density seats and room for three cars. BAF was the last operator in Europe of the aircraft, keeping them flying into the 1970s.

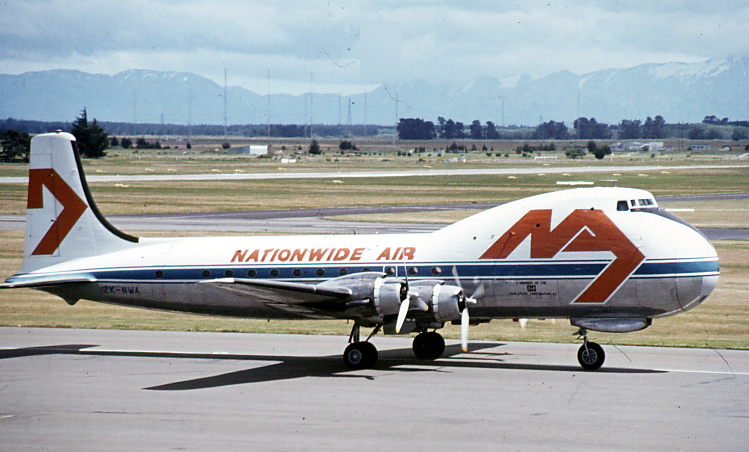
Aviation Traders ATL-98 Carvair of Nationwide Air at Christchurch, New Zealand in 1977

== Former operators ==
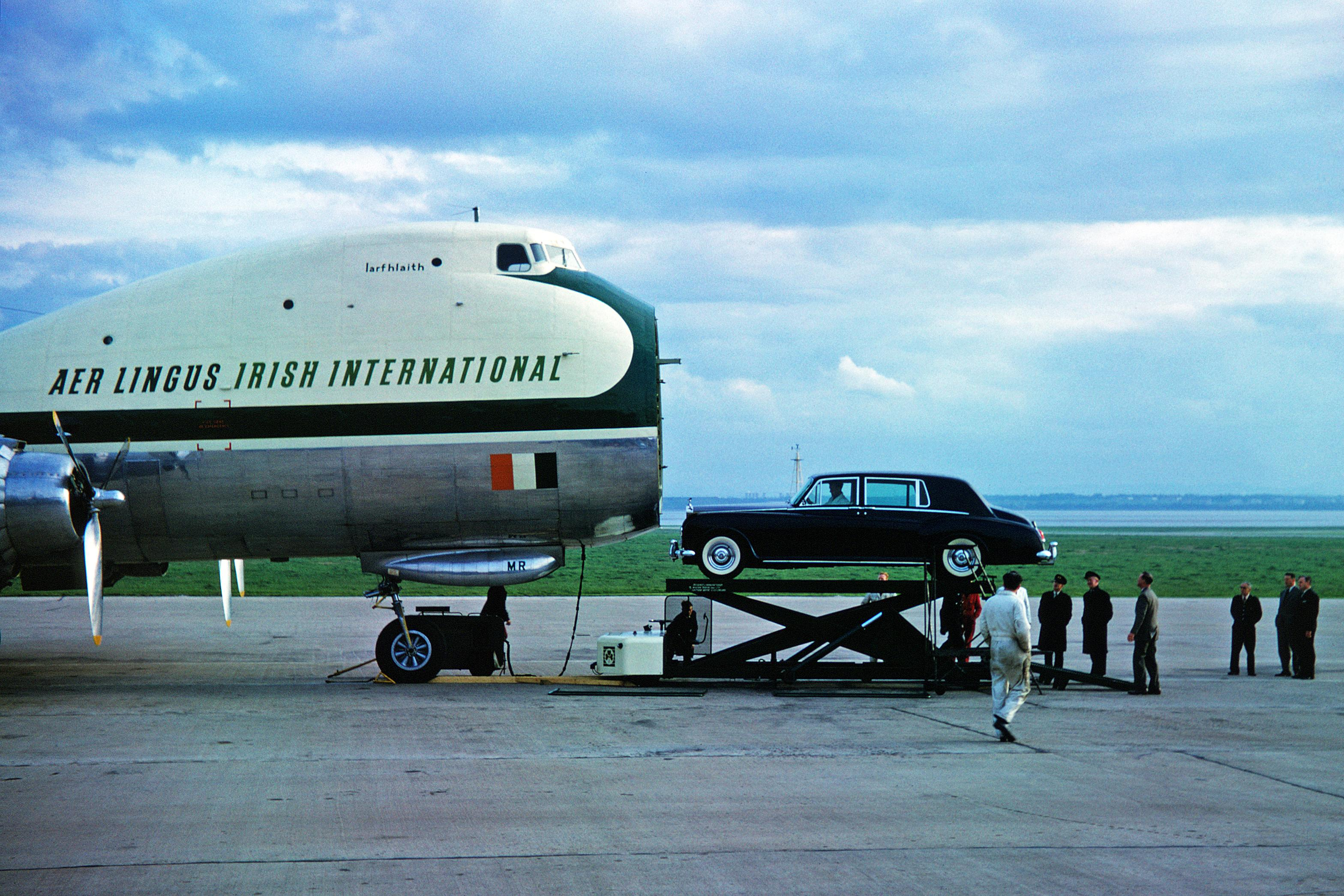
A Rolls-Royce being loaded onto an Aer Lingus Carvair, at Liverpool 19 May 1963

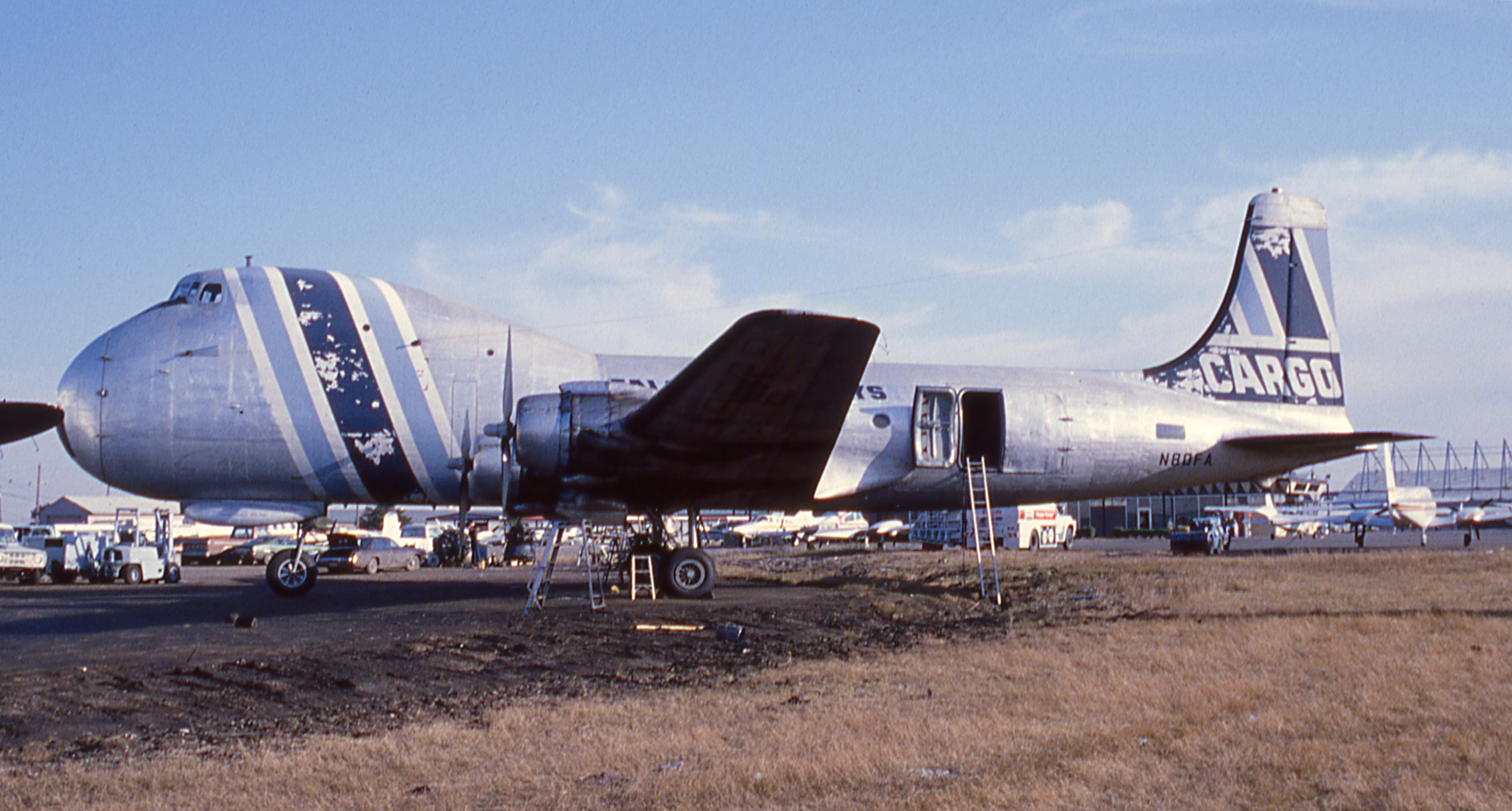
ATL-8 Carvair transport, Dallas, Texas, 1979

Australia

- Ansett Australia

Canada

- Eastern Provincial Airways

Republic of the Congo

- Aero Service

Dominican Republic

- Dominicana de Aviación

France

- Compagnie Air Transport
- SF Air
- SOACO
- Transport Aériens Réunis

Ireland

- Aer Lingus

Italy

- Alisud

Luxembourg

- Interocean Airways

New Zealand

- Nationwide Air

Spain

- Aviaco

Switzerland

- International Committee of the Red Cross

Tunisia

- Tunis Air

United Kingdom

- British United Air Ferries and successor British Air Ferries (BAF)
- Channel Air Bridge

United States

- Falcon Airways

== Accidents and incidents ==
Of the 21 airframes, eight were destroyed in crashes:

- Rotterdam, Netherlands 1962
- Karachi, Pakistan 1967
- Twin Falls, Newfoundland and Labrador, Canada 1968
- Miami, Florida, United States 1969
- Le Touquet, France 1971
- Venetie, Alaska, United States 1997
- Griffin, Georgia, United States 1997
- McGrath, Alaska, United States 2007

== Surviving aircraft ==
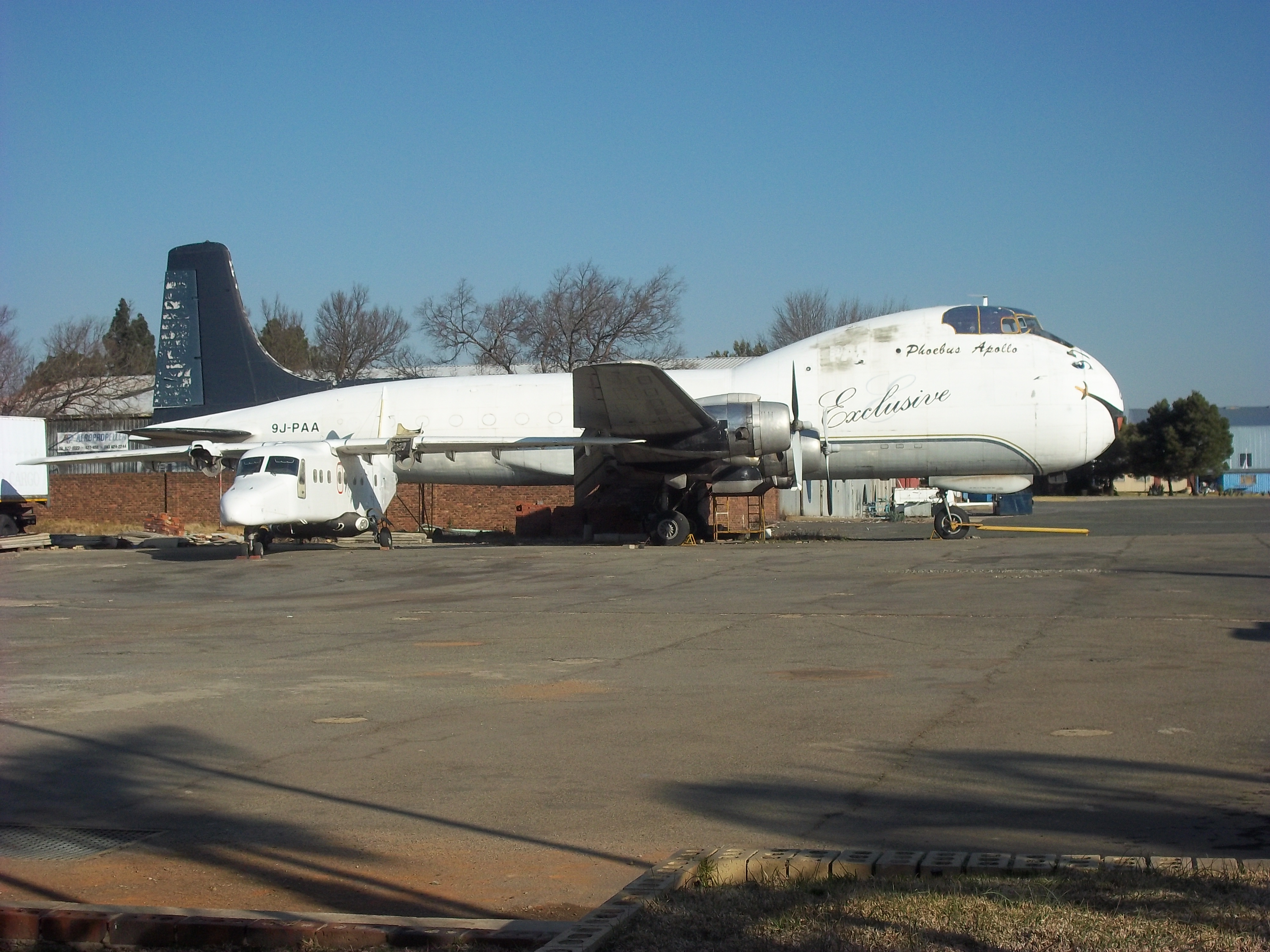
9J-PAA seen at Rand Airport, South Africa on 18 August 2011

- 9J-PAA (the 21st and final Carvair built) is in South Africa with Phoebus Apollo Aviation. Formerly registered in Zambia, the aircraft is currently on display at Rand Airport, where it sits near other uncommon aircraft such as the Boeing 747SP. Although removed from the Zambian register, the owner planned to return it to the skies for air shows.
- N89FA "Miss 1944" (the 9th Carvair) is based in Gainesville, Texas at KGLE Gainesville Municipal Airport. The aircraft is still complete as of April 2024, and has been seen receiving periodic maintenance, but there is no specific evidence that she has flown in recent years. In 2005 this aircraft appeared at the World Free Fall Convention, Rantoul, Illinois, where it took over 100 skydivers into the air in one flight.

== Specifications ==
Data from Jane's All The World's Aircraft 1965–66

General characteristics

- Crew: 2 or 3
- Capacity:
  - Maximum seating 85 passengers or
  - five cars and 22 passengers or
  - 19,335 lb (8,770 kg) cargo
- Length: 102 ft 7 in (31.27 m)
- Wingspan: 117 ft 6 in (35.81 m)
- Height: 29 ft 10 in (9.09 m)
- Wing area: 1,462 sq ft (135.8 m^{2})
- Aspect ratio: 9.45:1
- Airfoil: NACA 23016 at root, NACA 23012 at tip
- Empty weight: 41,365 lb (18,763 kg)
- Max takeoff weight: 73,800 lb (33,475 kg)
- Fuel capacity: 2,993 imp gal (3,594 US gal; 13,610 L)
- Powerplant: 4 × Pratt & Whitney R-2000-7M2 Twin Wasp 14-cylinder radial engines, 1,450 hp (1,080 kW) each
- Propellers: 3-bladed Hamilton-Standard Hydromatic, 13 ft 1 in (3.99 m) diameter

Performance

- Maximum speed: 250 mph (400 km/h, 220 kn)
- Cruise speed: 207 mph (333 km/h, 180 kn) at 10,000 ft (3,000 m) (econ. cruise)
- Stall speed: 119 mph (192 km/h, 103 kn) (wheels and flaps up)
- Never exceed speed: 275 mph (443 km/h, 239 kn)
- Range: 2,300 mi (3,700 km, 2,000 nmi) at 10,000 ft (3,000 m) with maximum payload, 3,455 mi (3,002 nmi; 5,560 km) with 10,000 lb (4,500 kg) payload and max fuel
- Service ceiling: 18,700 ft (5,700 m)
- Rate of climb: 650 ft/min (3.3 m/s)
- Takeoff distance to 50 ft (15 m): 4,200 ft (1,300 m)
- Landing distance from 50 ft (15 m): 3,120 ft (950 m)

== Notable appearances in media ==
British United Carvairs made an appearance in the 1964 James Bond movie Goldfinger as Auric Goldfinger and bodyguard Oddjob boarded G-ASDC bound for Switzerland while Goldfinger's Rolls-Royce Phantom was being loaded through the Carvair's nose. In the 1967 TV series The Prisoner in the episode "The Chimes of Big Ben", the plane is seen being loaded through the nose, then taking off and landing again. A Carvair serves as Charlie Marshall's plane in the John Le Carre novel The Honourable Schoolboy.

== See also ==
Related development

- Canadair North Star – Canadian airliner with 4 piston engines, 1946
- Douglas C-54 Skymaster – Military transport aircraft derived from DC-4
- Douglas DC-4 – Four-engine propeller-driven airliner

Aircraft of comparable role, configuration, and era

- Armstrong Whitworth AW.660 Argosy – 1959 transport aircraft family by Armstrong Whitworth
- Bristol Freighter – Twin-engine freighter and airliner
