= Phoebus Apollo Aviation =

South African airline

IATA	ICAO	Call sign
—	PHB	PHOEBUS
- Founded: 1995
- Hubs: Johannesburg
- Alliance: Exclusive Alliance
- Fleet size: 2
- Headquarters: Rand Airport, Germiston, South Africa
- Key people: Owner: Hennie Delport
- Website: phoebusapollo.co.za

Phoebus Apollo Aviation is a passenger, charter and cargo carrier and a flight school in Johannesburg, Germiston.

== Fleet ==
=== Current fleet ===
The Phoebus Apollo Aviation fleet includes the following aircraft (as of October 2019):

Phoebus Apollo Aviation fleet
Aircraft	In Fleet	Notes
Douglas DC-9-30	2	
Total	1	

=== Former fleet ===
Phoebus Apollo Aviation retired fleet
Aircraft	Operated	Notes
Douglas DC-3 Skytrain	1	
Douglas DC-4 Skymaster	1	
Douglas DC-9-32	1	
ATL-98 Carvair	1	
