= Aviation Traders =

1947–1959 British aviation company

Aviation Traders Limited (ATL) was a war-surplus aircraft and spares trader formed in 1947. In 1949, it began maintaining aircraft used by some of Britain's contemporary independent airlines on the Berlin Airlift. In the early 1950s, it branched out into aircraft conversions and manufacturing. During that period it also became a subcontractor for other aircraft manufacturers. By the end of the decade, it was taken over by the Airwork group.

== History ==
Aviation Traders Ltd. (ATL) was established by Freddie Laker at Bovingdon in Hertfordshire, England, in 1947 to trade in war-surplus aircraft and spares. Two years later, Laker shifted his fledgling business to new premises at Rochford aerodrome (later Southend Municipal Airport) near Southend-on-Sea, Essex, England.

ATL initially specialised in converting numerous war-surplus bombers and transporters into freighters. This included the conversion of Handley Page Halifax bombers into freighters, six of which were sold to Bond Air Services, an early post-war independent British airline. Bond Air Services based these planes at Wunstorf aerodrome in West Germany to carry essential supplies into West Berlin during the Berlin Blockade of 1948–49. Bond Air Services furthermore contracted Aviation Traders to service these planes. In return, Aviation Traders got half of Bond Air Services' freight charges. Following the end of the Berlin Airlift in 1949, Laker had most of the Halifaxes he had supplied to various independent airlines during the Airlift scrapped at its Southend facilities.

Aviation Traders (Engineering) Ltd – (ATEL), ATL's engineering division, was formally established in 1949. Laker put Jack Wiseman, a fully qualified aircraft maintenance engineer with whom he had worked for a brief period at London Aero Motor Services (LASM), in charge of his new engineering business.

Three former British European Airways (BEA) Vickers Vikings, which Laker had acquired in 1949 as well, were overhauled at ATL's Southend maintenance base and sold on to British Overseas Airways Corporation (BOAC) at a profit.

The following year, ATL's engineering arm cannibalised a number of unairworthy Yorks and Lancasters Laker had purchased to rebuild the salvaged parts into three airworthy Yorks.

ATL also became one of many post-war aircraft manufacturers which attempted to develop a successor to the ubiquitous Douglas DC-3 piston-engine airliner.

ATL's answer was the 28 passenger ATL-90 Accountant powered by two Rolls-Royce Dart turboprop engines, which first flew on 9 July 1957, however ATL's design was competing against a large number of designs from well-established aircraft manufacturers with much deeper pockets and could not match the scale of their investments, either in the design and development or in marketing it. Competing designs including the Convair CV-240 series, Fokker F-27 Friendship and Vickers VC.1 Viking also saturated the market. As a consequence, the Accountant failed to attract orders, which led to the programme's termination and in the prototype's destruction.

Subsequent conversion work was more successful. Avro Tudor airliners were fitted with large side freight doors for Air Charter Ltd (one of ATL's sister companies) as Supertraders.

Twenty-one Douglas DC-4 airliners were converted into car ferries as the ATL-98 Carvair, a major rebuild that replaced the aircraft's original nose with an enlarged version that raised the cockpit above the cargo hold and added a hinged nose through which five cars could be loaded with a mobile scissor lift. Twenty-five passengers could be carried in the unaltered rear fuselage while the fin was enlarged to offset the increased side area of the new forward fuselage. Carvairs were operated from Southend Airport on short air ferry routes across the English Channel or North Sea where they supplemented Bristol Freighters already being used in the same role. High speed car ferry service by large hovercraft such as the SR.N4 meant an end to the service.

ATL installed unused Rolls-Royce Merlins in ex-BOAC Canadair Argonaut (North Star) airliners. The engines were acquired earlier along with ex-BOAC Halifaxes and several Avro Tudors purchased from the British Government.

In 1951, ATL won a contract from Bristol Aircraft to manufacture wing centre sections for Bristol Freighters. Between the beginning of 1952 and the end of 1955, ATL built 50 wing sections for Bristol Aircraft. During that period ATL had grown into a large engineering and manufacturing organisation.

In 1956, ATL purchased over 250 surplus ex-Royal Air Force Percival Prentice trainers, about 20 of which were converted for civilian customers.

In 1958, Laker announced his decision to sell both ATL and Air Charter to Airwork for £600,000 cash plus a further £200,000, subject to the valuation of stock. The deal became effective in January 1959, when both companies joined the Airwork group.

In 1996, Britavia, which was part of Airwork and was the design arm of Shorts Support Services ceased trading as Britavia and was subject to a Management Buy-Out, and started trading again as Aviation Traders Limited (ATL) based at Bournemouth Airport until 2016. In 2016 ATL moved to their current offices in Wimborne. ATL provided approved design services under the CAA reference of DAI/9525/96. With the introduction of EASA, ATL moved under the control of EASA and transferred to a Design Organisation Approval (DOA) under Part 21J and now certifies and designs fixed and rotary wing modifications under approval reference EASA.21J.016. ATL are currently opening a European company and office to continue following BREXIT.

== Aircraft ==
- ATL.90 Accountant – Prototype medium-range airliner
- ATL.92 – Proposed military variant of the Accountant
- ATL.93 – Proposed military variant of the Accountant
- ATL.98 Carvair – Modified Douglas DC-4 for use as a car transport
