= Bristol Superfreighter =

Cargo aircraft

Type 170 Series 32 Superfreighter
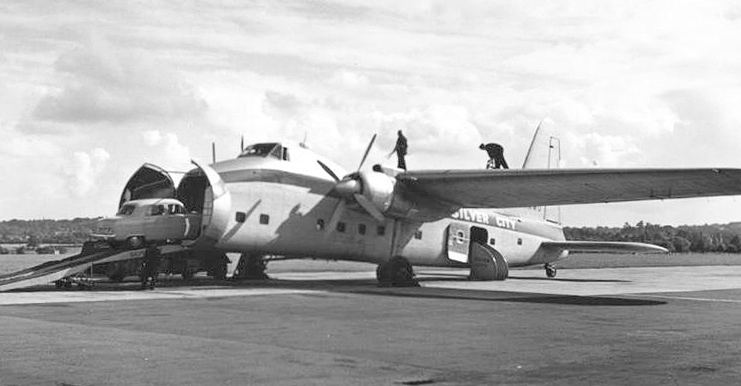
- A Bristol Superfreighter of Silver City Airways at Southampton Airport in 1954

General information
- Type: Cargo aircraft Passenger aircraft
- Manufacturer: Bristol Aeroplane Company
- Status: Retired
- Primary user: Silver City Airways; British United Air Ferries; British United Airways

History
- Introduction date: 1953
- First flight: 16 January 1953
- Developed from: Bristol Freighter

The Bristol Type 170 Superfreighter Mk 32 was a larger, stretched version of the Bristol Freighter designed for Silver City Airways for use on the short air ferry routes to France.

== Production and operation ==
The first Superfreighters, with a longer - 42 ft 3 in (12.88 m) - hold than the earlier Mark 31, were delivered to Silver City Airways in spring 1953 and were used on cross-channel services to Europe. One example was converted to a 60-seat all-passenger "Super Wayfarer".

The Mark 32 could carry 20 passengers instead of 12 in the smaller Mark 31 Freighter, and three cars instead of two in its air ferry role.

The Superfreighter was distinguishable from the earlier Freighter by having a longer nose, in which the extra car was carried, and a fin fillet as well as rounded wingtips.

A British United Air Ferries Superfreighter appears in the 1966 comedy film That Riviera Touch as the means by which Morecambe and Wise travel abroad with their car. The aircraft also appears in the 1965 film "Hysteria", and in the 1969 TV series "The Gold Robbers"

== Operators ==
- Air Charter
- Air Ferry
- British Air Ferries (BAF)
- British United Air Ferries (BUAF)
- Channel Air Bridge
- Compagnie Air Transport
- Lambair
- Midland Air Cargo
- SABENA
- Silver City Airways

== Specifications (Freighter Mk 32) ==
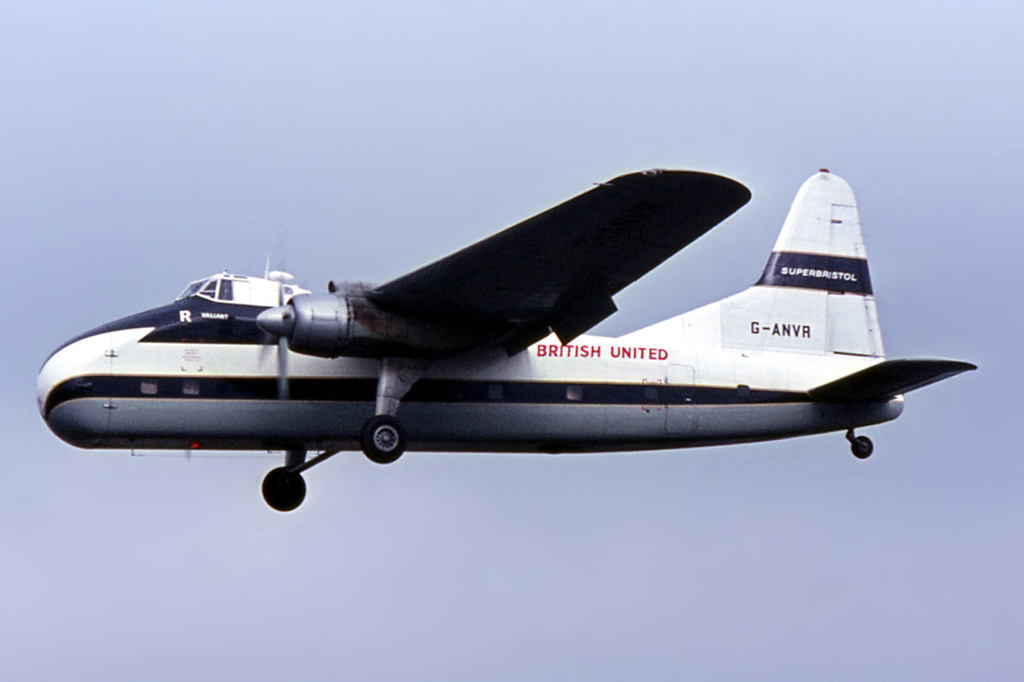
A British United Air Ferries Superfreighter in 1966

Data from Jane's all the World's Aircraft 1953–54

General characteristics

- Crew: 3
- Capacity: 22,300 cu ft (630 m^{3}) cargo hold / 13,659 lb (6,196 kg) (3 crew, 20 pax plus cars)
- Length: 73 ft 6 in (22.40 m)
- Wingspan: 108 ft 0 in (32.92 m)
- Height: 25 ft (7.6 m)
- Wing area: 1,487 sq ft (138.1 m^{2})
- Airfoil: RAF 28 (modified)
- Empty weight: 29,435 lb (13,351 kg)
- Gross weight: 44,000 lb (19,958 kg)
- Fuel capacity: 1,170 imp gal (1,410 US gal; 5,300 L) total (2 x 350 imp gal (420 US gal; 1,600 L) + 2 x 135 imp gal (162 US gal; 610 L) + 2 x 100 imp gal (120 US gal; 450 L)
- Powerplant: 2 × Bristol Hercules 734 14-cylinder air-cooled radial piston engines, 2,000 hp (1,500 kW) each
- Propellers: 4-bladed de Havilland constant-speed fully-feathering metal propellers, 14 ft (4.3 m) diameter

Performance

- Maximum speed: 225 mph (362 km/h, 196 kn) at 3,000 ft (910 m)
- Cruise speed: 164 mph (264 km/h, 143 kn) recommended, at 5,000 ft (1,500 m)
- Range: 820 mi (1,320 km, 710 nmi) with 12,000 lb (5,400 kg) payload
- Service ceiling: 23,000 ft (7,000 m) at max. continuous power and 38,000 lb (17,000 kg)
- Single-engined ceiling: 12,900 ft (3,900 m) at 38,000 lb (17,000 kg) with emergency climb power
- Rate of climb: 250 ft/min (1.3 m/s) On one engine at fully loaded weight
- Time to altitude: 10,000 ft (3,000 m) in 10 minutes at max. continuous power
- Power/mass: 11 lb/hp (6.7 kg/kW)
- Take-off distance to 50 ft (15 m): 2,500 ft (760 m) in a 5 mph (4.3 kn; 8.0 km/h) wind
- Landing distance from 50 ft (15 m): 2,300 ft (700 m) in a 5 mph (4.3 kn; 8.0 km/h) wind
