= Air ferry =

Aircraft carrying passengers and cars

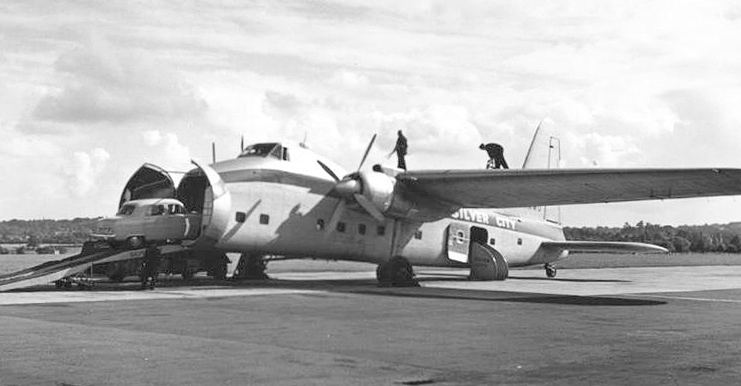
Bristol 170 Freighter 32 of Silver City Airways loading a car at Southampton in 1954

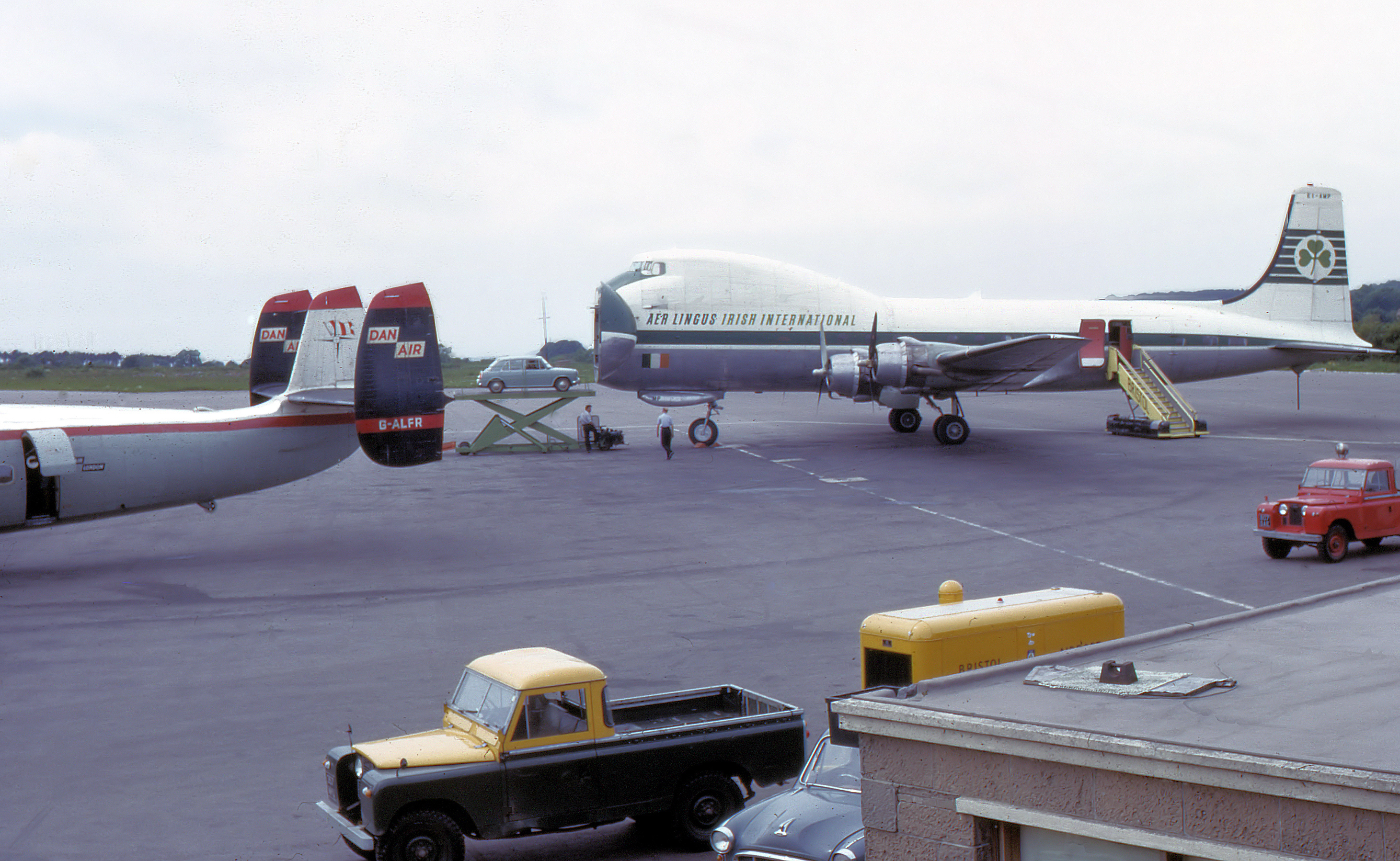
Aer Lingus Aviation Traders Carvair in 1965

An air ferry is a ferry service in which cars and passengers are transported by aircraft. Use of air ferries peaked in the 1950s, but the advent of more economical alternative modes of transport in the 1960s resulted in the demise of these services. Today a large part of cross-channel car transport is done through the Channel Tunnel.

== British services ==
The air ferry service was inaugurated by retired Royal Air Force officer Air Commodore Griffith J. ("Taffy") Powell, who founded an airline company called Silver City in 1948. Using Bristol Freighter aeroplanes, the service operated until 1954 from Lympne airfield, and later from Lydd airport. Other companies and routes opened across the English Channel. The ultimate air ferry aeroplane was the Aviation Traders Carvair, a conversion of the Douglas DC-4.

Air ferries were popular during the 1950s, when they were significantly faster and not much more expensive than the sea ferries. They ceased to be economically viable in the 1960s with the introduction of faster and more reliable roll-on/roll-off ferries, plus hovercraft on a few routes. Aircraft manufacturers were also reluctant to develop and build new aircraft for a small specialised market.

=== Airlines that offered air ferry services involving the British Isles ===
All the airlines below are defunct except Aer Lingus. Aer Lingus no longer offers transport of cars.

- Aer Lingus
- Air Ferry
- British United Air Ferries (later British Air Ferries and British World Airlines)
- Channel Air Bridge (merged with Silver City Airways forming British United Air Ferries)
- Silver City Airways (merged with Channel Air Bridge forming British United Air Ferries)
