= Silver City Airways =

UK-based European airline

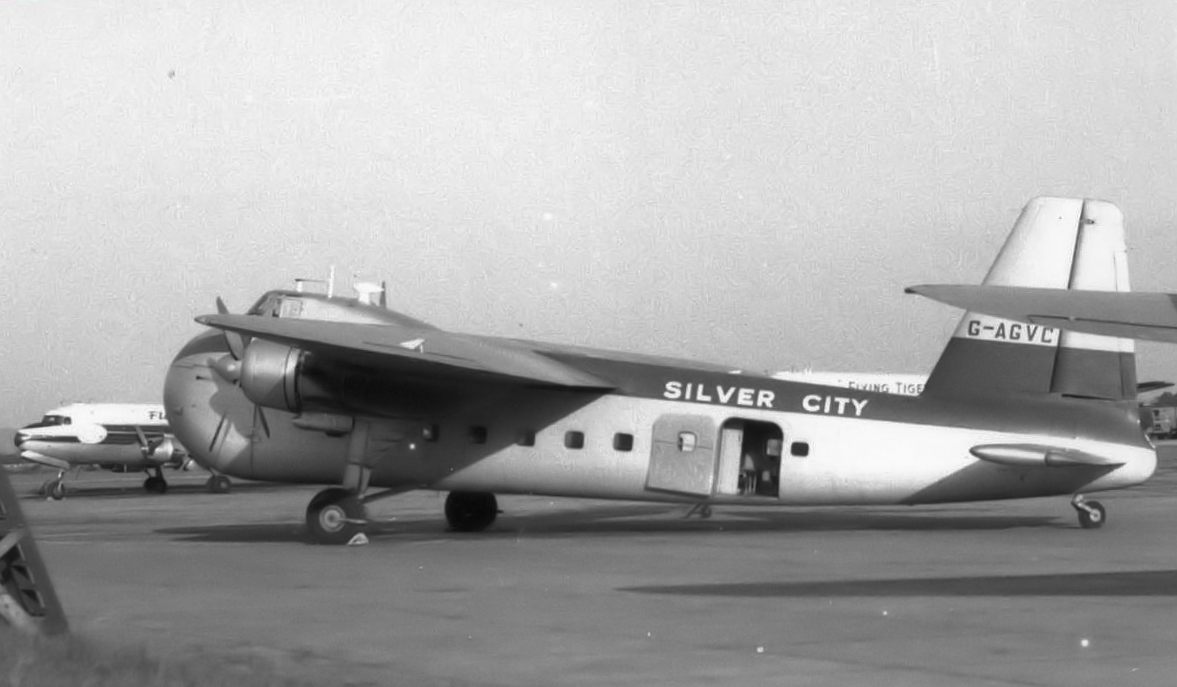
- Bristol 170 Mark 21 Freighter, 1955
IATA	ICAO	Call sign
SS	SS	—
- Founded: 1946
- Commenced operations: 1946
- Ceased operations: 1962 (merged into British United Airways)
- Operating bases: Langley Airfield, Berkshire; Blackbushe Airport; Lympne Airport; Southampton Airport; Southend Airport; RAF West Malling; Lydd Ferryfield; Bournemouth Airport; Jersey Airport; Guernsey Airport; Manchester Airport; Newcastle Airport; Blackpool Airport; Isle of Man Airport; Manston Airport; London Gatwick; Le Touquet Airport; Tripoli Airport; Benghazi Airport
- Fleet size: 31 aircraft (4 Handley Page Hermes, 10 Bristol Superfreighter, 5 Bristol Freighter, 11 Douglas Dakota; 1 de Havilland Dove (as of 1962))
- Destinations: scheduled: Europe non-scheduled: worldwide
- Parent company: British Aviation Services/Britavia
- Headquarters: Central London
- Key people: Hugh Kennard, Eoin C. Mekie, Air Cdre Griffith J. Powell

Silver City Airways was an airline based in the United Kingdom that operated mainly in Europe between 1946 and 1962. Unlike many airlines at the time, it was independent of government-owned corporations; its parent company was Zinc Corporation, an Australian company involved mainly in mining and mineral processing. The name "Silver City" originated as a nickname of Broken Hill, Australia – an area famed for silver mines, including some owned by the airline's parent company.

The first commercial flight by Silver City departed London Heathrow for Sydney via Johannesburg in late November 1946. The following year, Silver City leased its first Bristol Freighter, moved its base to Blackbushe and participated in the airlift of Hindu and Muslim refugees between Pakistan and India. In 1948, control of Silver City passed from the Zinc Corporation to British Aviation Services. In July of that year, the airline inaugurated the world's first air ferry service across the English Channel between Lympne Airport and Le Touquet Airport. In 1948–49, Silver City participated in the Berlin Airlift. In 1949, it established a French sister airline.

In 1953, Silver City took delivery of its first Bristol Superfreighter. The following year, the company moved to a new permanent home at Lydd Ferryfield, Britain's first newly constructed post-war airport. The same year, Silver City Airways came under the control of P&O. By the mid-1950s, Silver City had become the biggest air cargo carrier in the United Kingdom while annual passenger numbers at its "Ferryfield" base had reached ¼ of a million. During that time, the airline also inaugurated air ferry services between Scotland and Ireland and from/to the Midlands. This period also saw the launch of Silver Arrow, a London—Paris coach-air-coach/rail service, with the cross-Channel air portion operating between Lydd and Le Touquet. In 1957, Silver City accomplished its one-millionth Channel crossing. In summer 1958, Silver City's "Ferryfield" base recorded more aircraft movements than any other UK airport. That year, also marked the conclusion of Silver City's first decade of air ferry operations during which the airline operated more than 100,000 flights carrying over 200,000 vehicles and ¾ of a million passengers, with peak-day frequency exceeding 200. In 1959, Silver City took over sister airline Britavia's Handley Page Hermes fleet and Manston base. That year, the airline also began oil industry support flights in Libya.

By 1960, Silver City's 40,000 annual cross-Channel flights transported 220,000 passengers and 90,000 vehicles while network-wide freight haulage reached 135,000 tons a year. The following summer, the airline reached agreement with a French rival to co-finance construction of a branch line linking Le Touquet Airport with the nearby main railway line to reduce surface travelling time from/to Paris. Unsustainable losses as a result of the loss of the Libyan oil industry support flight contract, increasing competition from roll-on/roll-off ferries and the lack of suitable replacements for the ageing Bristol Freighters resulted in growing financial difficulties, culminating in Silver City's takeover by British United Airways (BUA) holding company Air Holdings in 1962.

== History ==
=== The 1940s ===
In 1946, Air Cdre Griffith James ("Taffy") Powell got in touch with W.S. Robinson, chairman of London-based mining company the Zinc Corporation. That meeting resulted in Robinson appointing Powell as the Zinc Corporation's adviser.

One of Powell's first visits in his new capacity took him to Broken Hill, Australia, also known as Silver City. This visit resulted in the decision to set up a new air transport operator to serve the mining industry, to be named Silver City.

Silver City Airways Ltd. was incorporated on 25 November 1946. British Aviation Services (BAS) (or Britavia), an early post-World War II airline holding company and air transport operator, became one of Silver City's shareholders, initially taking a 10% stake. Air Cdre Griffith James Powell was the first managing director of both BAS and Silver City.

Silver City's first base was at Langley Airfield, Berkshire.

The airline's initial fleet comprised four ex-military Douglas Dakotas and three Avro Lancastrians, the 13-seater civil version of the Lancaster Mark 3 bomber. Two of the latter were new aircraft that had been ordered by British South American Airways (BSAA).

Lancastrian G-AHBW operated the company's first commercial flight, from London Airport (Heathrow) to Sydney via Johannesburg in November 1946. This was followed by similar operations to Johannesburg via Karachi and to Malta before the end of the year.

In October 1947, Silver City became involved in the airlift of Hindu and Muslim refugees between Pakistan and India, following the Subcontinent's partitioning. This operation constituted the fledgling airline's first major engagement. Initially, the repatriation airlift was undertaken by four Dakotas. On short journeys, the authorities granted Silver City dispensation to raise the limit on the maximum number of passengers it could carry from 28 to 52 to airlift as many people as quickly as possible.

Also that year, Silver City moved its base to Blackbushe Airport, as a result of Langley's closure due to Heathrow's expansion.

Also in 1947, Silver City leased its first Bristol Freighter from the manufacturer to replace one of the four Dakotas that had originally been allocated to the repatriation airlift in the Indian subcontinent. Like the Dakotas it had operated on that airlift, Silver City was given dispensation to increase the maximum number of passengers it could carry on the Bristol Freighter above the normal limit of 32. Actual loads on this aircraft type often exceeded 100 passengers per flight, resulting in a total of 1,105 evacuees and their belongings being transported aboard Silver City's single Freighter over a period of nine days. The airline's Bristol Freighter fleet soon expanded to four aircraft. The Freighter would play a major role in the company's development over the coming years. Powell realised that the Bristol Freighter could be adapted to fly car owners with their vehicles from Britain to Continental Europe and the Channel Islands. This "air ferry" would allow British holidaymakers avoid long waits for sea ferries and time-consuming, bumpy rides in rough waters.

On 7 July 1948, a Silver City Bristol Freighter operated the first cross-Channel air ferry service, between Lympne near Folkestone in Kent and Le Touquet on France's northern Côte d'Opale coast, with good road connections from and to London and Paris respectively. The new service, which initially operated on a seasonal charter basis, became a year-round scheduled operation in 1949. In the beginning, there was a flat £32 one-way fare to take a group of four passengers along with their car across the Channel. Once opposition from British European Airways (BEA) to the carriage of passengers travelling without vehicles was overcome, a new fare structure was introduced. For example, a group of four travelling with a small car was charged only £27, while the comparable fare for four people travelling with a large car remained at £32. By the end of 1949, this operation fully utilised five Freighters, which carried 2,700 cars and 10,000 passengers. These figures represented a significant increase over the previous year when only 178 cars and their occupants, as well as some motorcycles and bicycles had been carried until the end of the season in September.

The same year, the Zinc Corporation sold its shareholding in Silver City to BAS, making the latter the airline's sole owner. Silver City subsequently became BAS's biggest operating division.

Silver City joined the 1948–49 Berlin Airlift with a single Bristol Freighter in September 1948. Owing to heavy demand for additional civilian airlift capacity, the airline leased a further two Freighters from the Bristol Aeroplane Company. By the time the civil contribution to the Airlift was scaled down in February 1949, the company's three Bristol Freighters were the last twin-engined airliners employed in this operation. When it came to an end, the firm's Freighters had flown a total of about 800 hours.

In February 1949, Silver City established a French sister airline headquartered in Paris to operate vehicle ferry flights from Le Touquet Airport. The new company was registered under the name Société Commerciale Aérienne du Littoral (SCAL). A number of Silver City aircraft were registered to this company. These were transferred onto the French aircraft register. In addition, an agreement was reached to appoint the Automobile Club de France as Silver City's and SCAL's official representative in France. These steps were necessary to secure French approval to turn the seasonal charter flights Silver City had operated on this route into a full-fledged scheduled operation.

=== The 1950s ===
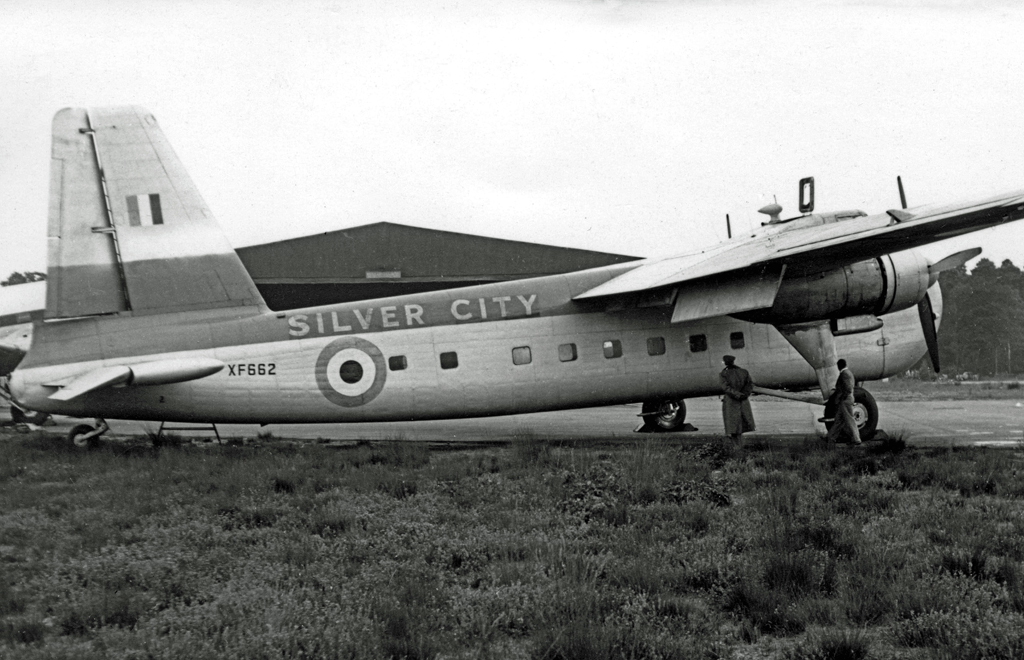
A Bristol 170 in RAF markings in 1953, used for freight flights to and through the Suez Canal Zone

By 1950, the number of cars and passengers carried on Silver City's cross-Channel services roughly doubled to 5,000 and 24,000 respectively.

To encourage further traffic growth on its Lympne — Le Touquet cross-Channel car ferry service, Silver City reduced fares with effect from 19 September 1950: the rate for cars up to 14 feet in length was cut from £27 to £19 while the rate for larger vehicles dropped from £32 to £25. This reduction left Silver City's fares only slightly higher than the Dover—Calais ferry fares of British Railways' Southern Region and, together with the service's earlier extension permitting the carriage of cycles and motor cycles, helped establish the airline's ferry services as a serious competitor to the railways.

The success of Silver City's Lympne — Le Touquet air ferry service resulted in subsequent introduction of additional routes across the English Channel and to other parts of the United Kingdom.

Over the coming years, Silver City pursued a policy of continuous fare reductions to fill the additional capacity on its growing air ferry network. This included new car ferry services between Southampton (Eastleigh) and Cherbourg as well as between Southend (Rochford) and Ostend and a DC-3 passenger service linking Gatwick and Le Touquet. Both of the former commenced in spring 1952, while the latter was inaugurated the following year. As a result, the number of vehicles carried doubled from 5,000 to 10,000 between 1950 and 1952 and quadrupled to 40,000 by the end of the following year. The latter was the consequence of an average 40% fare reduction.

BAS's takeover of Air Kruise, an independent charter and pleasure flight operator based at Lympne, in March 1953 brought a fleet of all-passenger de Havilland Dragon Rapides and Douglas Dakotas. This acquisition resulted in formation of Silver City's "Passenger Division".

In summer 1953, Silver City leased a Breguet Br.763 to participate in the second Little Berlin Airlift on the Hamburg (Fuhlsbüttel) — Berlin (Tempelhof) route. A total of 127 round trips carried 4,000,000 pounds (1,800 t) of freight with up to three round trips being made in a day, each leg taking 52 minutes' flight time.

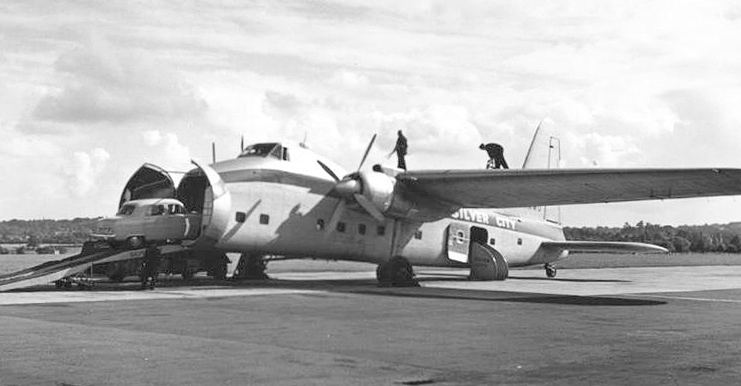
A Bristol 170 Mark 32 Superfreighter loading a car at Southampton in 1954

In 1953, Silver City also took delivery of its first stretched Mark 32 Bristol Superfreighter, the first of six. The Superfreighter's elongated nose enabled it to accommodate three cars or to be fitted with 60 seats in an all-passenger Super Wayfarer configuration. The new Superfreighters joined a fleet of nine standard Mark 21 Freighters. Other freight charter work at this time included flights to the Suez Canal Zone supporting the UK military forces then stationed there.

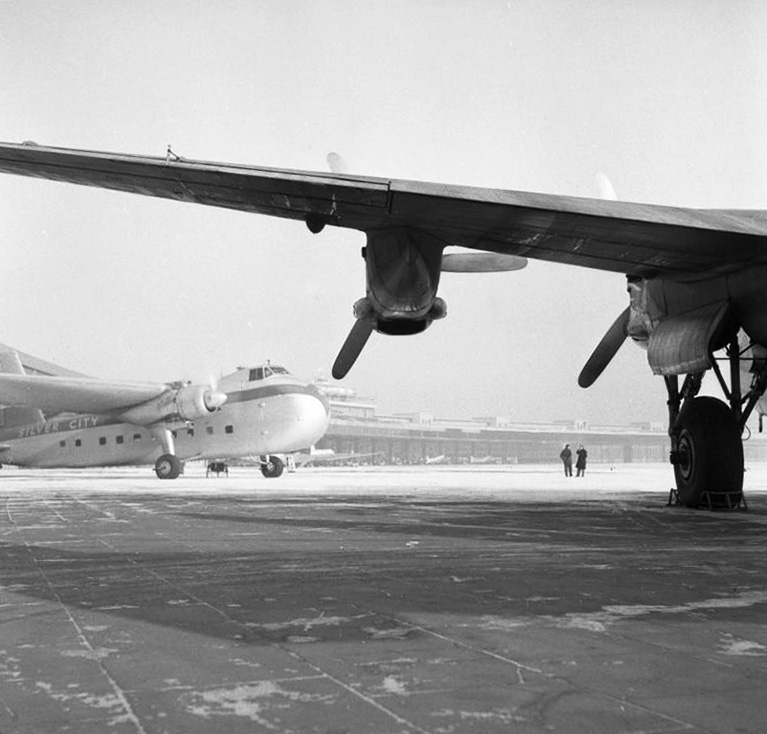
A Bristol Freighter at Berlin Tempelhof in 1954

As operations expanded, the small grass airfield at Lympne became increasingly inadequate. The search for a suitable location to site a new, purpose-built airport began in 1953. Interim moves to Southend and West Malling were followed by final selection of an area covered by grazing land on the edge of the Dungeness shingle desert on the Kentish coast close to the village of Lydd. This site would host Britain's first newly constructed post-war and first privately owned airport. It would feature two runways, a control tower, passenger terminal with a restaurant, maintenance area and petrol station. The new airport — named Ferryfield — opened on 14 July 1954, after six months' work costing £400,000. However, it took almost another two years for the official opening ceremony to be performed at Ferryfield, which occurred on 5 April 1956. On that day, the Duke of Edinburgh arrived at Ferryfield just before 11.00 am on board the Royal Heron. The occasion marked the Duke's first visit to a private British airline at an all-new, privately owned airport. Following his tour of the airport's facilities, the Duke boarded one of Silver City's scheduled air ferry services to Le Touquet on Superfreighter G-AMWD. During the 19-minute flight, the Duke flew the aircraft at its scheduled en route height of 1,000 ft. The Duke's reception at Le Touquet Airport was followed by an informal lunch hosted in his honour by the president of the French Aero Clubs in the airport restaurant. The Duke then departed, flying the Royal Heron to London Airport. By 1954, the Silver City cross-Channel network comprised five routes: Gatwick — Le Touquet, Lydd — Le Touquet, Lympne—Calais, Lympne—Ostend and Southampton—Cherbourg.

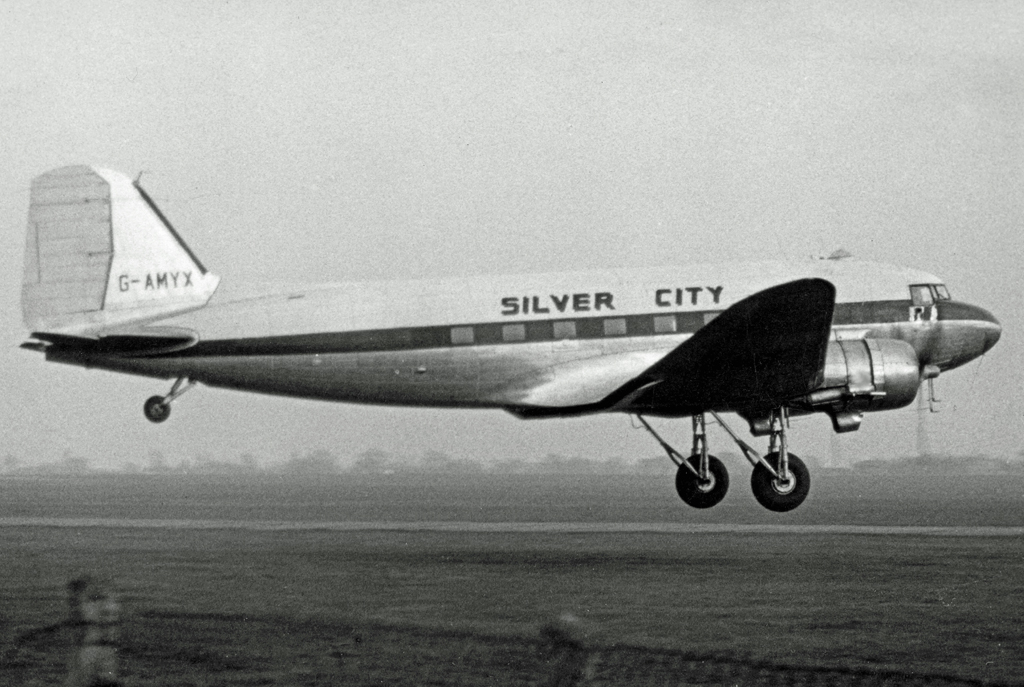
A Douglas Dakota landing at Manchester Airport in 1954

Following the opening of Ferryfield in mid-1954, Silver City initially split its operations between the new airport and Lympne. For a short while, Le Touquet flights operated from the former while Calais and Ostend services continued to use the latter. The last of 33,000 Silver City flights, which had carried a total of 54,000 cars and 208,000 passengers since 1948, departed Lympne on 3 October. From then on, vehicle ferry services were concentrated at Ferryfield.

Also in 1954, control of Silver City passed to P&O via General Steam Navigation, which had acquired a 70% stake in BAS, the airline's parent company. It was also the year Silver City complemented its Gatwick — Le Touquet all-passenger operation with a vehicle ferry service.

By 1955, Ferryfield handled 250,000 passengers annually. This made it busier than Gatwick.

Also in 1955, Silver City launched its first air ferry services between Scotland and Ireland and its first such service from the Midlands. These linked Stranraer with Belfast and Birmingham with Le Touquet. In addition, the airline opened a new service from Southampton to Deauville.

That year also saw Silver City become the UK's biggest air cargo carrier with an annual freight volume of 70,190 tons.

In 1956, Silver City commenced London—Paris coach-air-coach/rail services via Lydd (Ferryfield) and Le Touquet/Étaples. As Le Touquet Airport was not linked to the French railway network at the time, the journey between the airport and Paris involved an additional change between coach and train at Étaples. DC-3s initially operated these all-passenger services, which were marketed as Silver Arrow in the UK and as Flèche d'argent in France. Silver Arrow/Flèche d'argent was a joint operation between British Railways, Silver City and Société Nationale des Chemins de Fer français (SNCF).

By 1957, BAS's airline subsidiaries included Air Kruise, Aquila Airways, Britavia, the Lancashire Aircraft Corporation and the original Manx Airlines, apart from Silver City Airways itself. The need to rationalize the various activities led to the creation of three Divisions: Air Ferry, Northern, and Southern. Air Ferry Division had been actually established in July 1948 and began operating in the spring of the following year. In 1962 it will merge to form BUAF-British United Air Ferries. Northern Division absorbed Dragon Airways (in early 1957), Lancashire Aircraft (accomplished between 1957 and 1958), (1st) Manx Airlines (accomplished between 1957 and 1958). Southern Division absorbed Air Kruise cross-Channel services (in 1958) and part of previous Silver City air ferry flights. In November 1962 it will merge to form British United (C.I.) Airways.

Also in 1957, Silver City completed its one-millionth Channel crossing since its inaugural Lympne — Le Touquet air ferry service took to the air in July 1948.

That year also saw Silver City become involved in supporting the oil industry in Libya, flying geologists and supplying desert camps with a fleet of DC-3s and a single DC-2 from bases at Tripoli and Benghazi. The airline's sole DC-2 was originally operated by Swissair and subsequently sold to new owners in South Africa, who leased it to Silver City.

By 1958, Ferryfield had become one of Britain's three busiest airports. It recorded more aircraft movements during the peak summer months than any other airport in the UK, and only Heathrow and Northolt were busier in terms of annual air freight volume.

That year also marked the conclusion of the first decade of Silver City's air ferry services. During that period, the airline completed 125,000 ferry flights. These carried 215,000 vehicles and 750,000 passengers. At its peak, Silver City operated 222 daily ferry flights across the English Channel, as well as between Scotland and Ireland and to/from the Isle of Wight, the Channel Islands and the Isle of Man. Cross-Channel flights to France operated between 7.30 am and 11.00 pm. The average fare was £25 per car and £4 per passenger. This was furthermore the time the Air Kruise cross-Channel services, as well as all Dragon Airways, Lancashire Aircraft Corporation and Manx Airlines operations from Newcastle upon Tyne, Blackpool and the Isle of Man were transferred to Silver City's new Northern Division to streamline BAS's fragmented airline operations. It was hoped that these measures would improve BAS's financial performance.

In May of the same year, the crew of a Silver City Dakota made the first sighting of the Lady Be Good, a WW II bomber that had disappeared in 1943 while returning from an operation to Naples, in the Libyan Desert.

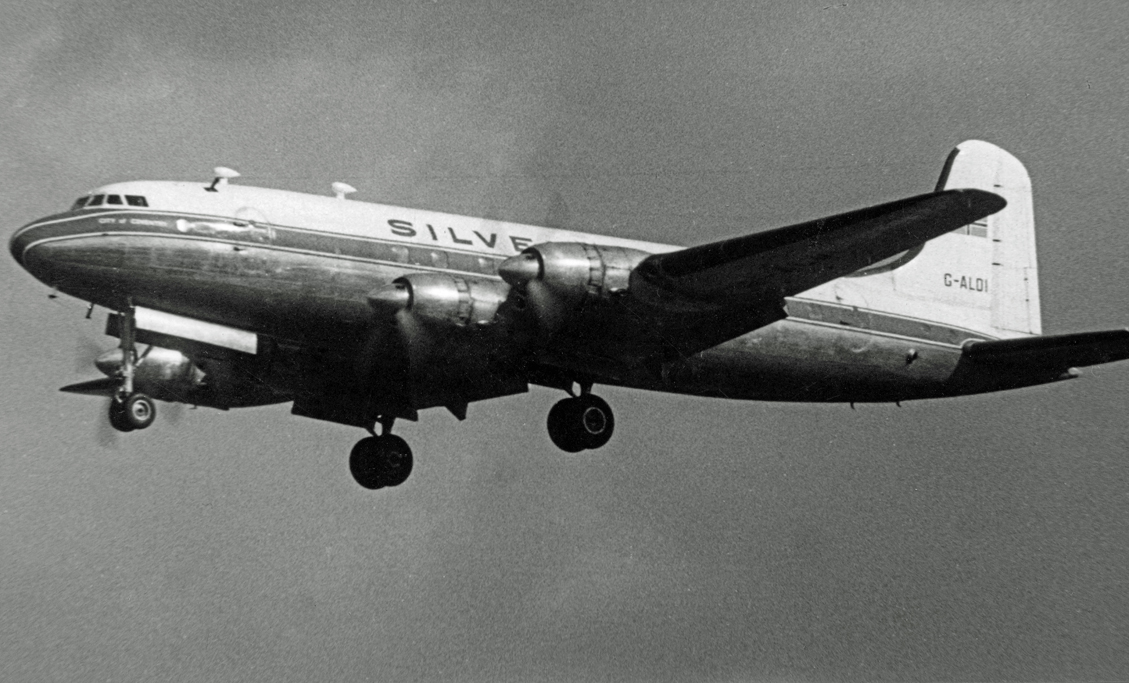
A HP.81 Handley Page Hermes serie 4 in 1962

In 1959, Britavia transferred its five-strong Hermes 4A fleet to sister airline Silver City, as a consequence of the loss of a trooping contract to Eagle. The Hermes were based at Manston, from where they operated Silver Arrow all-passenger services to Le Touquet and inclusive tour charters to European destinations until parent company BAS's acquisition by British United Airways (BUA) parent Air Holdings in 1962. Britavia effectively stopped flying in June 1959.

Also in 1959, Silver City opened a Blackpool-Dublin route.

By the end of that decade, Silver City advertised £8 18s day-return fares for its London—Paris Silver Arrow/Flèche d'argent service.

=== The 1960s ===
By 1960, Silver City made 40,000 yearly Channel crossings, carrying 90,000 vehicles and 220,000 passengers. During that year, it also moved 135,000 tons of freight across its network. This represented an increase of 35% over the previous year.

In summer 1961, Silver City agreed with rival French air ferry operator Compagnie Air Transport (CAT) for the latter to finance the construction of a two-mile rail spur into Le Touquet Airport from the nearby main line to reduce the travelling time between the airport and Paris by cutting out the coach/rail change at Étaples. In return, Silver City transferred three of its Superfreighters to CAT along with the traffic rights to operate the Ferryfield — Le Touquet and Bournemouth (Hurn) — Cherbourg routes. This arrangement gave CAT a 25% share of the car ferry market between Britain and France.

Having been outbid by Belgium's flag carrier Sabena for the Libyan oil industry support flight contract that year, Silver City's losses became unsustainable. This necessitated the sale of three Superfreighters to CAT for £192,300.

Following growing financial difficulties, Silver City was taken over by BUA parent Air Holdings in 1962. The takeover was officially announced in January of that year. Air Holdings were the owners of Channel Air Bridge, a rival air ferry operator based at Southend in Essex, which operated similar services from Southend to the Continent. The BUA-BAS merger removed BUA's last remaining independent competitor in the air ferry business. The addition of Silver City's 650,000 annual ferry passengers increased the yearly combined total to just under one million, accounting for two thirds of BUA's total passengers. However, the change in ownership failed to staunch the airline's losses. These amounted to £650,000 during the first half of 1962. By the end of the year, the Silver City name ceased to be used as all aircraft had either been repainted in BUA colours or retired.

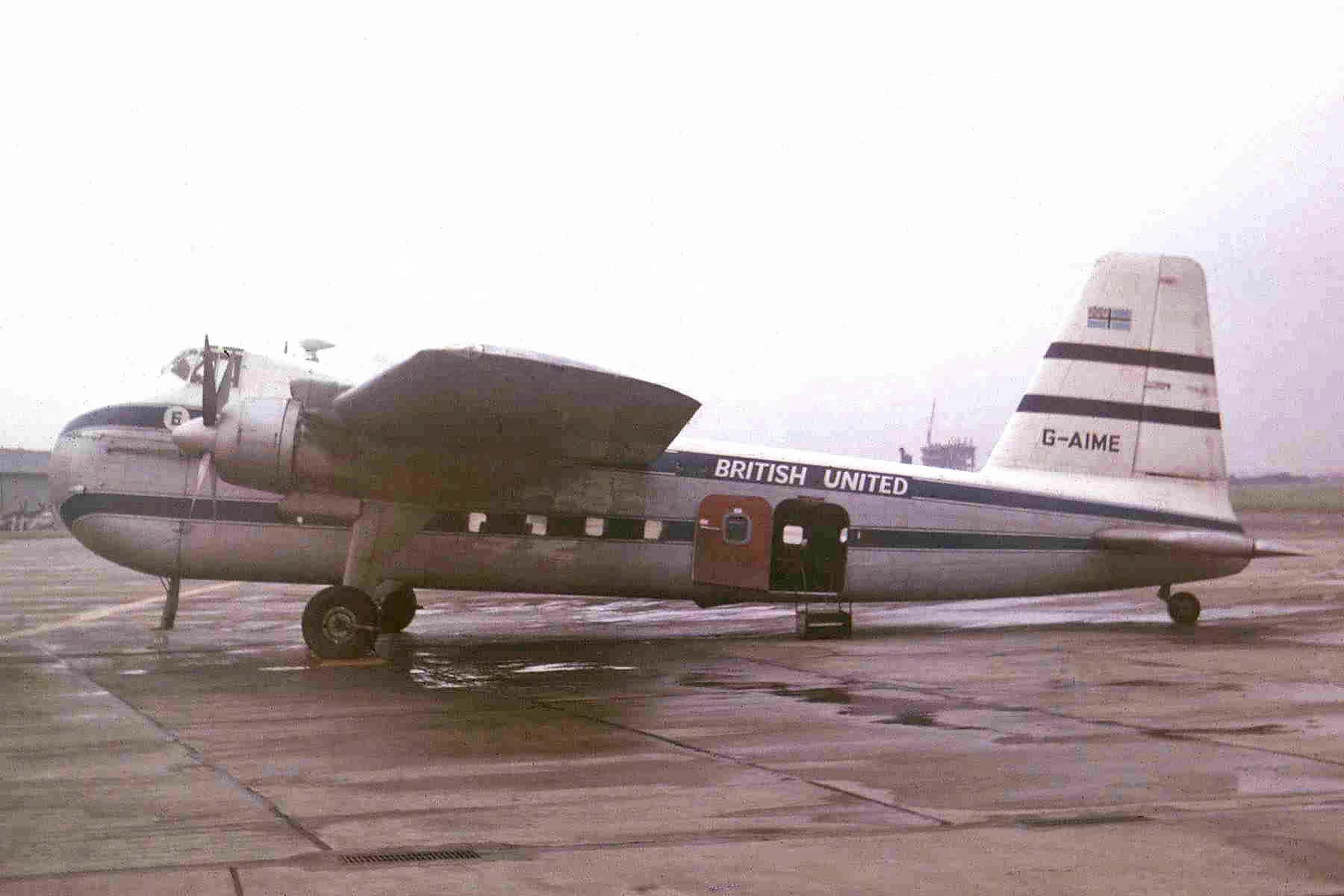
A Bristol 170 Mk21 still in Silver City colors but with British United titles

Despite the poor financial performance, 1962 turned out to be the busiest year in Silver City's 16-year history. During that year, (Note: 1961–62 financial year ending 31 March 1962) the airline and its French partner CAT carried 96,272 vehicles and 238,748 passengers on 43,064 flights, representing increases of 10%, 6% and 12% compared with 1961. (Note: 1960–61 financial year ending 31 March 1961) In addition, over 43,000 tonnes of cargo were carried. However, these record-breaking traffic statistics did not alter the fact that the airline's air ferry operation was no longer economically viable. With the advent of new, high-capacity roll-on/roll-off ferries competition intensified. Established aircraft manufacturers were not interested in producing reasonably priced replacements for the ageing Bristol Freighters/Superfreighters that were suffering from wing fatigue. The airline's long-standing policy of stimulating the market by continuously reducing fares had resulted in uneconomic yields in the absence of a corresponding reduction in costs. The Hermes fleet had continued in operation serving several UK airports, mainly on inclusive tour flights, with the last example being retired from service in late 1962. Silver City legally merged into British united Airways on 23 January 1962 while operations were integrated in the following month of October.

== Fleet details ==
Silver City operated the following aircraft types during its 16-year existence:

- 3 x Airspeed AS65 Consul
- 3 x Avro 691 Lancastrian 3
- 1 x Breguet BR761S Deux-Ponts leased
- 17 x Bristol 170 Mark 2A/21/21E Freighter
- 14 x Bristol 170 Mark 32 Freighter (Superfreighter)
- 1 x de Havilland DH86 Express
- 2 x de Havilland DH89A Dragon Rapide
- 1 x de Havilland DH90 Dragonfly
- 4 x de Havilland DH104 Dove 1/2
- 2 x de Havilland DH114 Heron 1B
- 24 x Douglas C-47/47A/B/53D Dakota
- 1 x Douglas C-54B Skymaster leased
- 5 x Handley Page HP81 Hermes 4
- 1 x Percival P34 Proctor 3
- 3 x Vickers Viscount 708 leased

=== Fleet in 1950 ===
In 1950, Silver City operated 16 aircraft.

Silver City Airways fleet during 1950
Aircraft	Number
Bristol 170 Mark 21/21E Freighter	5
Douglas C-54 Skymaster	1
Douglas Dakota	2
de Havilland Dove	3
de Havilland Dragonfly	1
Airspeed Consul	2
Lockheed Lodestar	1
Percival Proctor	1
Total	16

=== Fleet in 1954 ===
23 aircraft.

Aircraft type	Number
Bristol 170 Mark 32 Superfreighter	9
Bristol 170 Mark 21/21E Freighter	6
Douglas Dakota	2
de Havilland Dove	1
de Havilland Dragonfly	1
Airspeed Consul	2
Lockheed Model 12 Electra Junior	1
Westland-Sikorsky Dragonfly	1
Total	23

=== Fleet in 1958 ===
38 aircraft.

Aircraft type	Number
Bristol 170 Mark 32 Superfreighter	14
Bristol 170 Mark 21/21E Freighter	7
Douglas Dakota	12
de Havilland Heron	2
de Havilland Dragon Rapide	1
de Havilland Express	1
de Havilland Dragonfly	1
Total	38

=== Fleet in 1962 ===
31 aircraft.

Aircraft type	Number
Handley Page Hermes	4
Bristol 170 Mark 32 Superfreighter	10
Bristol 170 Mark 21/21E Freighter	5
Douglas DC-3	11
de Havilland Dove	1
Total	31

== Accidents and incidents ==
There are six recorded accidents involving Silver City aircraft, three of which were fatal.

1. 21 March 1950 - Bristol 170 Mark 21 Freighter (registered G-AHJJ) crashed after take-off nera Cowbridge (Glam). Four fatalities.
2. 19 January 1953 - The first non-fatal accident. A Bristol 170 Mark 21 Freighter (registered G-AICM) operating a cargo flight from Tempelhof Airport. Bad weather at the destination forced it to return to Berlin resulting in fuel starvation. The accident damaged the aircraft beyond economical repair, but both pilots survived.
3. 27 February 1958 - The worst accident in company history, when a Bristol 170 Mark 21E Freighter (registered G-AICS) was operating a charter flight on behalf of Manx Airlines from the Isle of Man to Manchester crashed in bad weather on Winter Hill near Bolton, Lancashire, destroying the aircraft and killing 35 of 39 passengers (all three crew members survived). The aircraft was chartered by the Isle of Man motor trade to take members to the Exide battery factory in Clifton Junction, and it hit the northeast slope of Winter Hill in thick fog at a height of approximately 1,460 feet (450 m) and burst into flames, as a result of a navigational error committed by the first officer.
4. 4 November 1958 - Bristol 170 Mark 21 Freighter (registered G-AGVB) which crashed into a beacon while landing at Le Touquet airport (France).
5. 1 November 1961 - The second fatal accident involved a Bristol 170 Mark 32 Superfreighter (registered G-ANWL), operating a scheduled service from Cherbourg to Guernsey, which crashed after losing height during a missed approach to Guernsey Airport. Having failed to gain height following a power increase to go around, the aircraft struck the ground with its starboard wing and cartwheeled due to a malfunctioning automatic pitch coarsening unit of the starboard propeller. Two out of three crew members were illed but all seven passengers survived. The aircraft was damaged beyond economical repair.
6. 30 June 1962 - B-170 (registered G-AGVC), operated by Manx Airlines, had the undercarriage collapsing on landing at Ronaldsway (IoM) airport. No fatalities.

== Resurrection ==
Air Holdings, which had retained the rights to the Silver City name following the merger between Silver City and Channel Air Bridge to form British United Air Ferries a decade earlier, resurrected Silver City Airways as a limited company from spring to October 1973.

The airline's second incarnation was as a specialist livestock carrier transporting cattle between Norwich and Germany. This operation utilised three of five Vickers Vanguards owned by Air Holdings, which had been leased to Invicta International Airlines. That airline's failure to pay for the leases had resulted in Air Holdings repossessing the aircraft and starting its own air freight operation.

Air Holdings' lack of success with its German cattle charters led to a decision to put the aircraft up for sale in October and to close down the resurrected airline the following month, with the Silver City name being de-activated by the end of the year.

== In fiction ==
- The company is mentioned in Ian Fleming's James Bond Novel "Goldfinger" – Goldfinger mentions to Bond that he takes his car to Europe – 'I take a plane to myself. The Silver City company knows the car. It is a regular routine, twice a year.'
- The company features in a British Black & white Comedy "A Weekend with Lulu"
- A Silver City Bristol 170 Car Ferry Aircraft is also featured in the Opening Titles of the Rock Hudson Movie "Come September"

== See also ==
- List of defunct airlines of the United Kingdom

== Notes ==
Notes

Citations
