= List of De Havilland Canada Dash 8 operators =

The De Havilland Canada Dash 8, previously the Bombardier Dash 8, is a regional turboprop aircraft that was previously delivered in three size categories, typically seating from 37 passengers (DHC-8-100) to 90 passengers (DHC-8-400). Only the larger DHC-8-400 model remained in production until 2021. The following lists both former and current operators.

== Unfilled orders ==
As of early 2021, De Havilland announced the suspension of production after a backlog of 19 aircraft had been completed. As of December 2018, the following customers had outstanding orders listed:

As of 31 December 2018
Airline	Country	Orders
Biman Bangladesh Airlines	Bangladesh	2
CIB Leasing	China	1
Conair Group	Canada	5
Ethiopian Airlines	Ethiopia	10
Philippine Airlines	Philippines	2
Qazaq Air	Kazakhstan	2
SpiceJet	India	25
US-Bangla Airlines	Bangladesh	3
Undisclosed		4
Total		54

== Civil operators ==
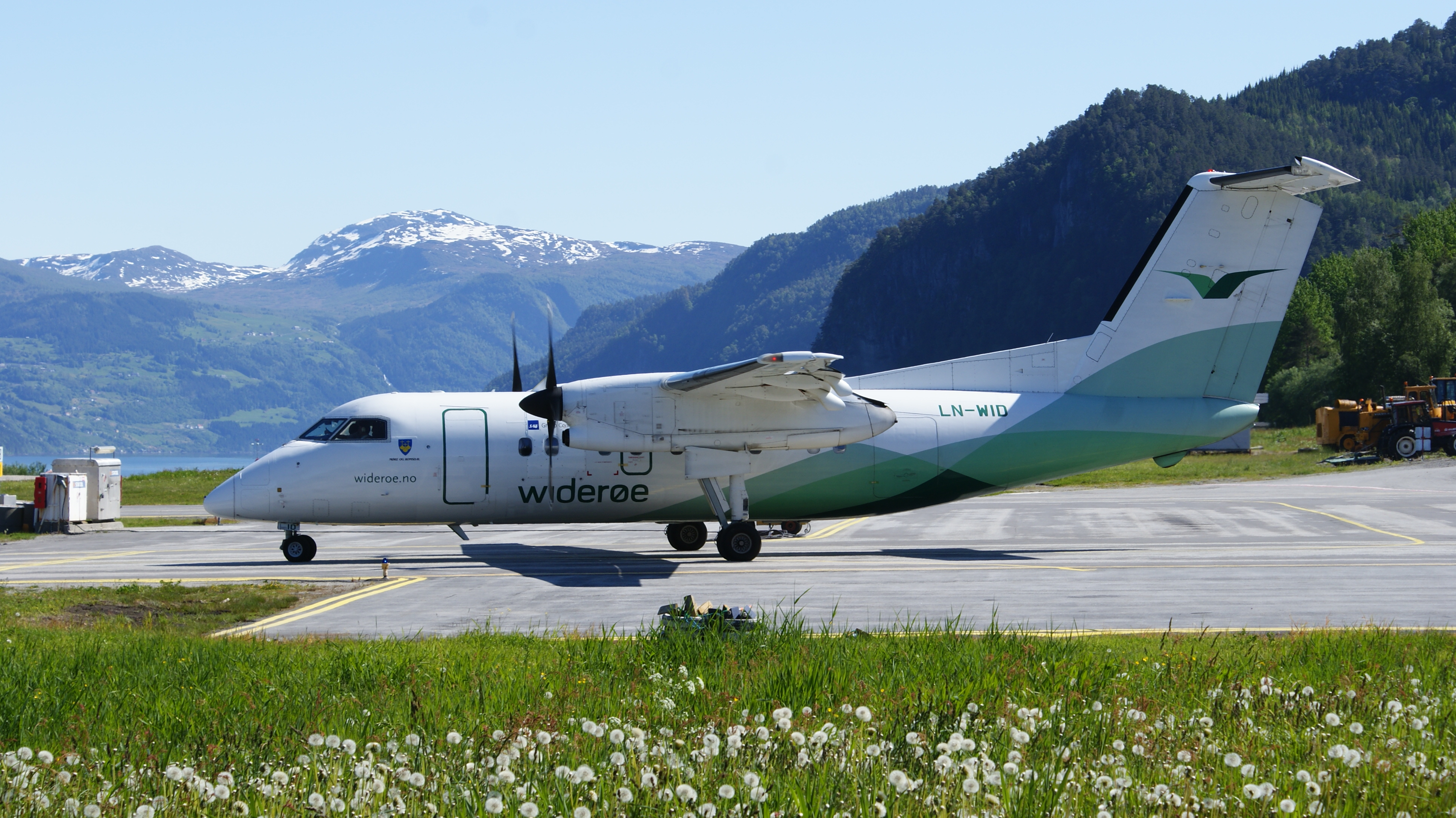
A Widerøe De Havilland 100 series at Sandane Airport

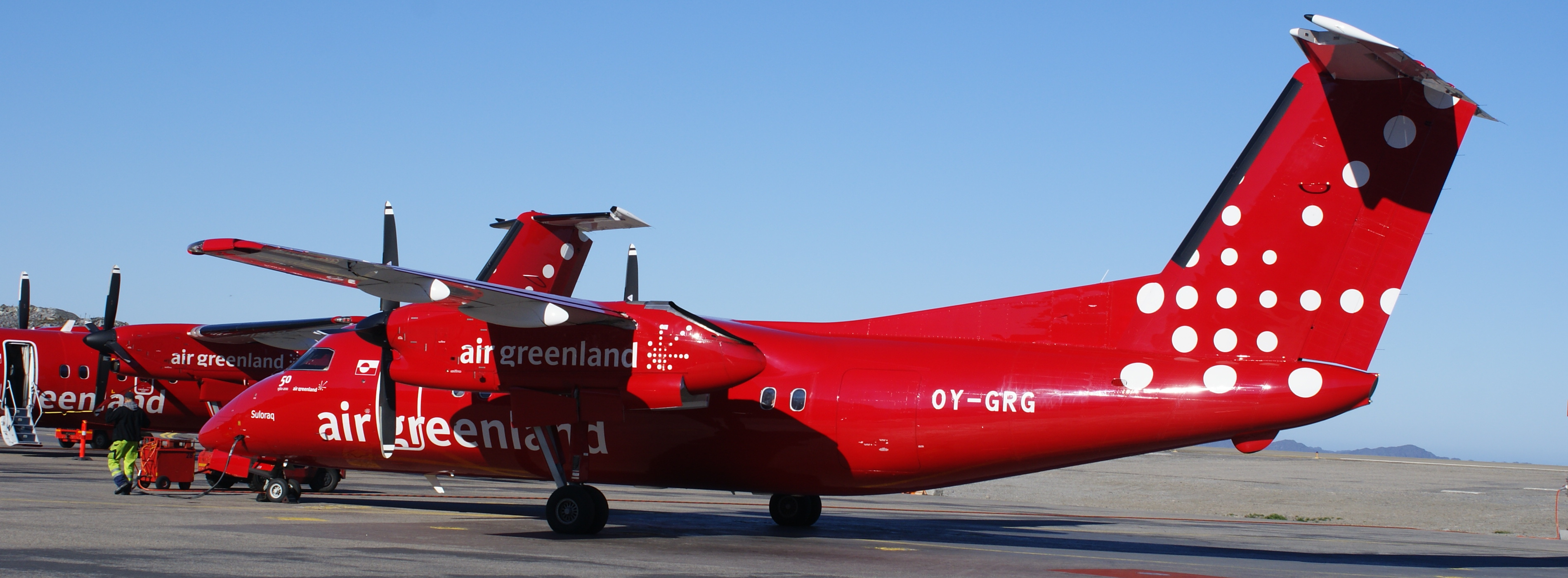
An Air Greenland De Havilland 200 series at Nuuk Airport

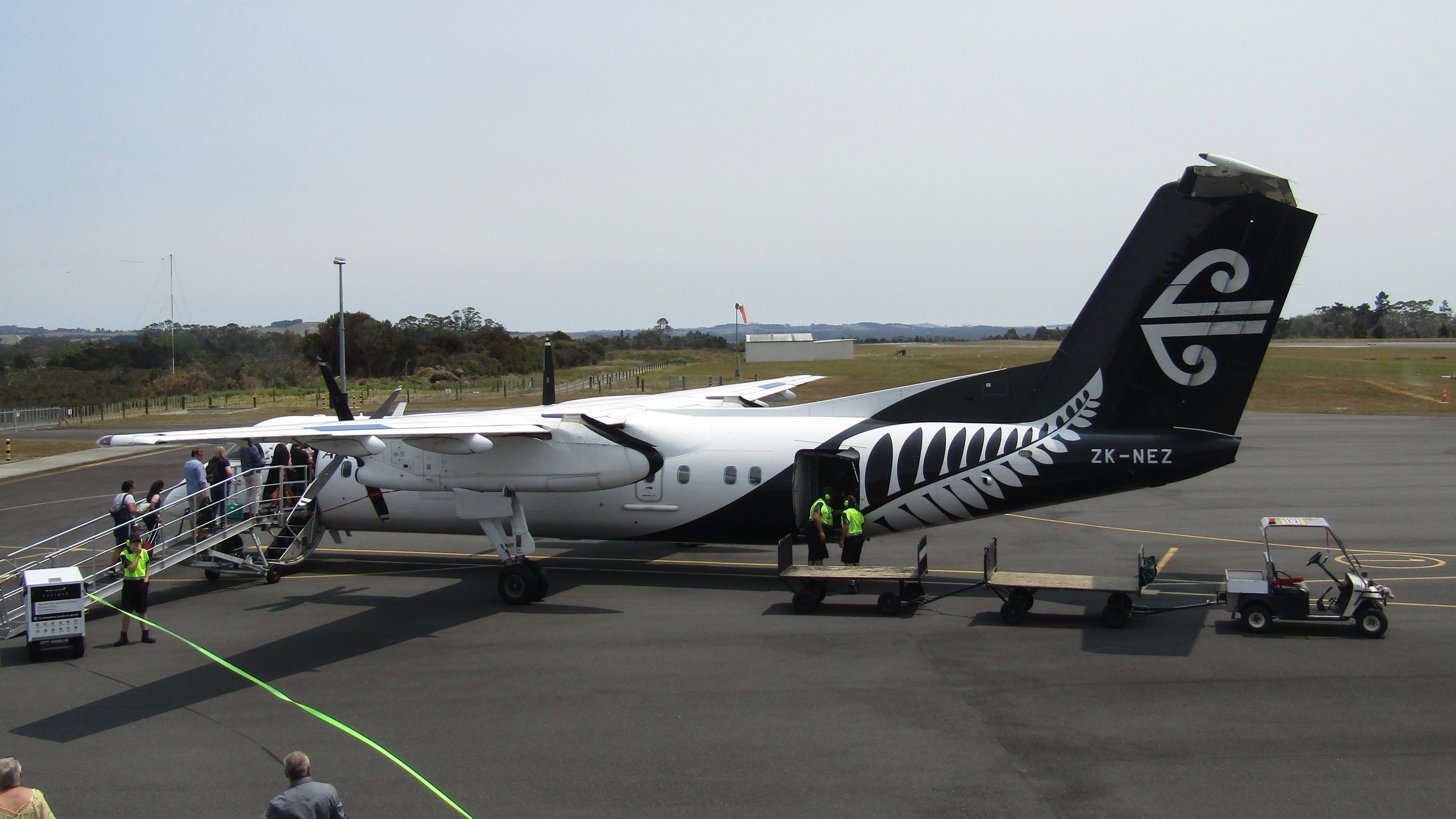
An Air New Zealand De Havilland 300 series at Kerikeri Airport

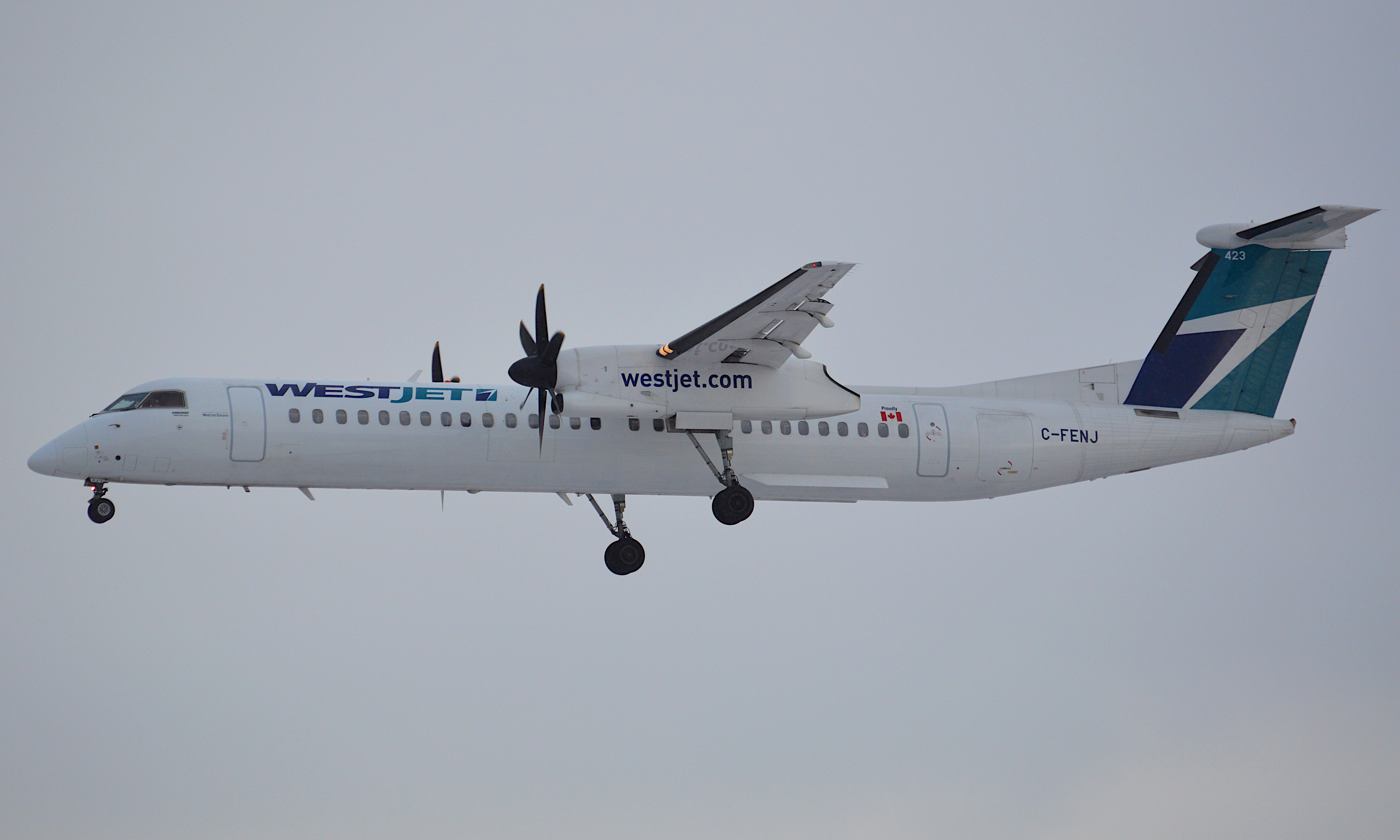
A WestJet Encore De Havilland 400 series at Calgary International Airport

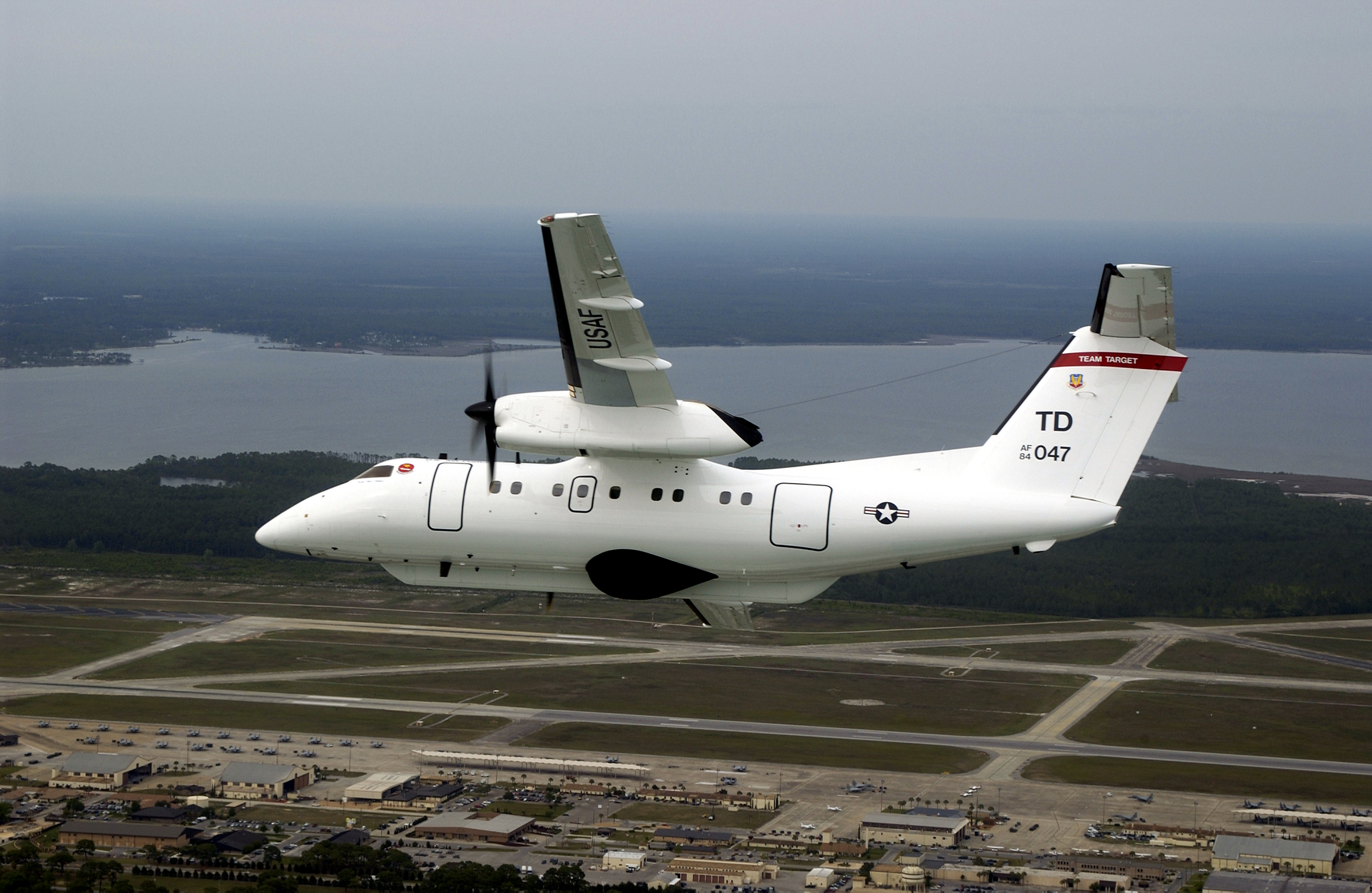
An E-9A Widget (developed from the 100 series) of the United States Air Force over Tyndall Air Force Base

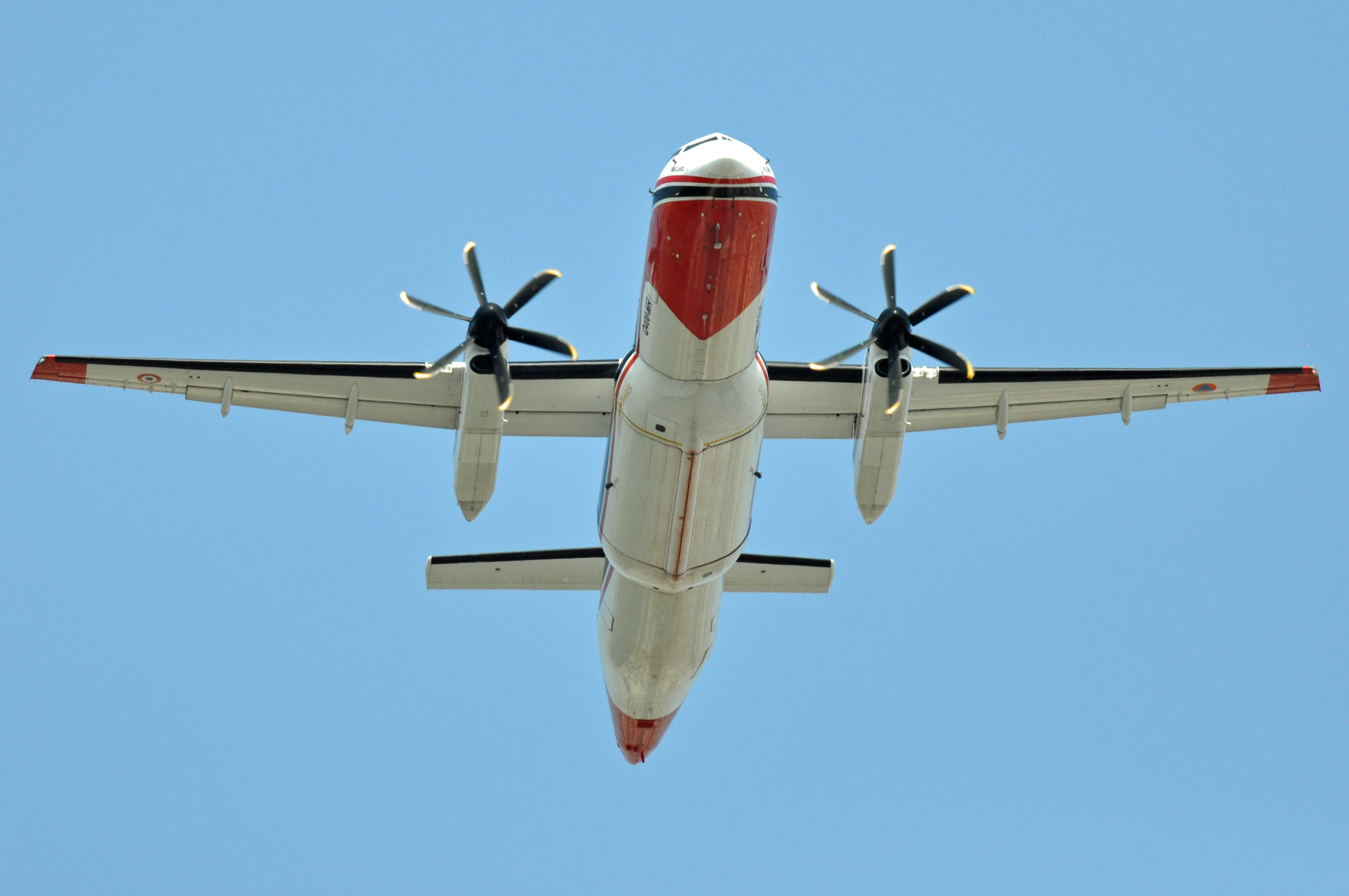
The underside of a Q400-MR (a Q400 adapted to aerial firefighting) as flown by the French Sécurité Civile

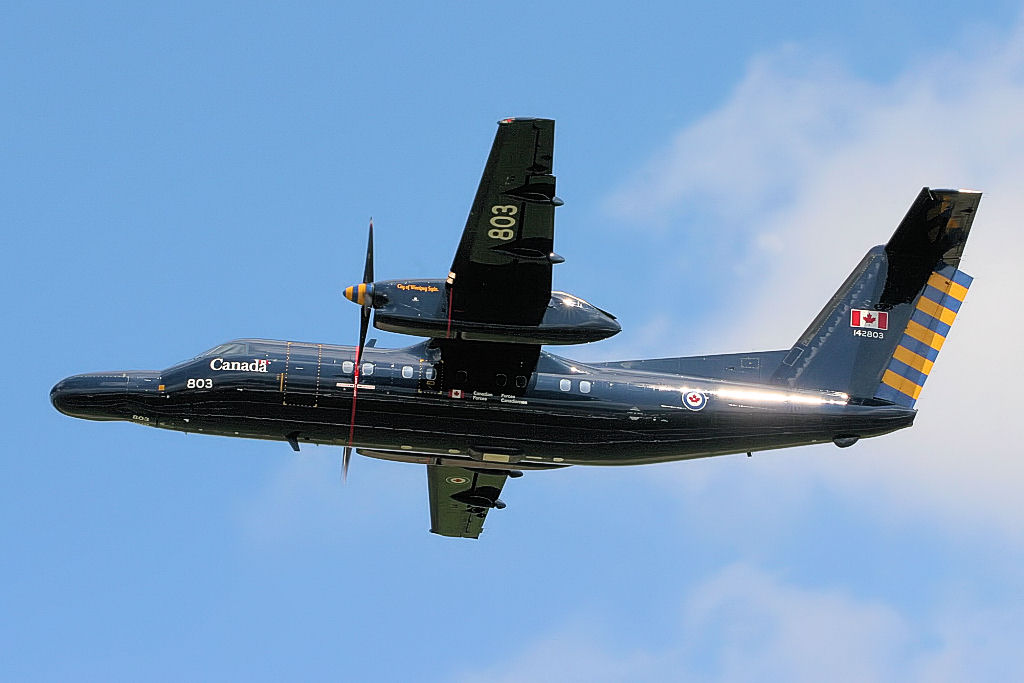
A CT-142 operated by the Canadian Air Force

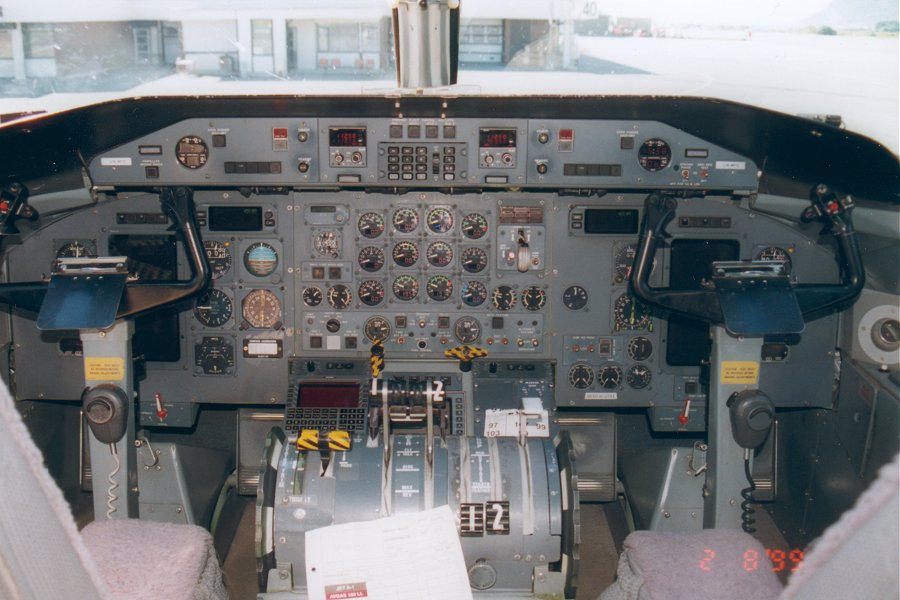
The cockpit on a 300 series

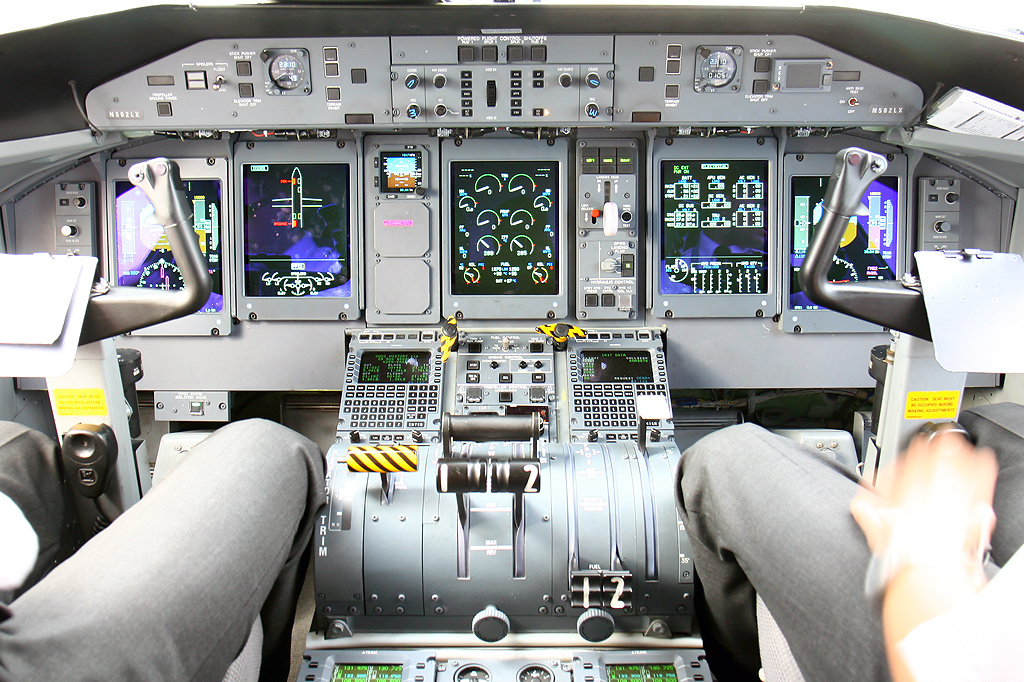
The cockpit on a 400 series

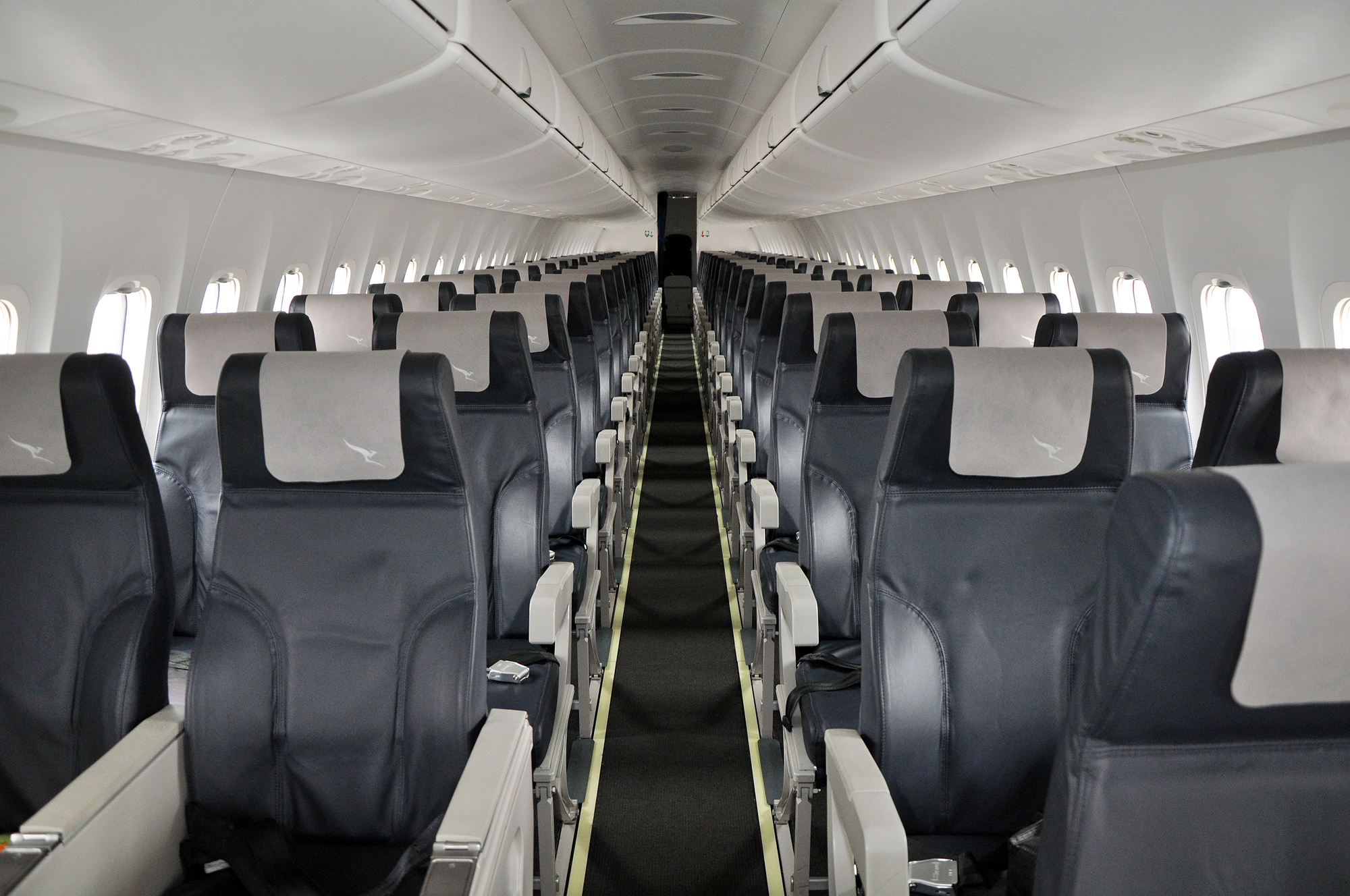
Inside a 400 series cabin with four-abreast, 2–2 seating

Figures for Canadian operators are correct as of 10 February 2025. The reference includes one DHC-8-102 operated by Hawkair Aviation Services. However, the airline ceased operations in 2016, the certificate of registration was cancelled and the aircraft is not listed below with current operators.

- A total of 164 Dash 8 Series 100 aircraft were in airline service with 39 operators as of July 2018 and February 2025.
- A total of 54 Dash 8 Series 200 aircraft were in commercial service with 27 operators as of July 2018 and February 2025.
- A total of 159 Dash 8 Series 300 aircraft were in airline service, with 45 operators as of July 2018 and February 2025.
- A total of 443 DHC-8-400 aircraft are in airline service, with 55 operators as of July 2018 and February 2025.

Airline	Country	-100	-200	-300	-400	Total	Orders	Options
748 Air Services	Kenya	6	—	—	7	13	—	—
Abu Dhabi Aviation	United Arab Emirates	—	—	3	1	4	—	—
Aero Contractors (Note: Operated for UmzaXpress)	Nigeria	—	—	—	3	3	—	—
Atsa Airlines	Peru	—	—	—	2	2	—	—
Air Bikini	Marshall Islands	1	—	—	—	1	—	—
Air Côte d'Ivoire	Ivory Coast	—	—	—	4	4	—	—
Air Creebec	Canada	18	—	2	—	20	—	—
Air Greenland	Greenland	—	8	—	—	8	—	—
Air Inuit	Canada	4	—	13	—	17	—	—
Air Marshall Islands	Marshall Islands	2	—	—	—	2	—	—
Air New Zealand	New Zealand	—	—	23	—	23	—	
Air Niugini	Papua New Guinea	—	—	1	4	5	—	—
Air Tanzania	Tanzania	—	—	1	5	6	—	—
Airkenya Express	Kenya	1	3	—	—	4	—	—
PNG Air	Papua New Guinea	4	—	—	—	4	—	—
Airworks Kenya	Kenya	—	2	—	—	2	—	—
Aircraft Leasing Services	Kenya	7	1	3	—	11	—	—
ANA Wings	Japan	—	—	—	25	25	—	—
Asman Airlines	Kyrgyzstan	—	—	—	3	3	1	—
Arik Air	Nigeria	—	—	—	4	4	—	—
Asia Pacific Airlines	Papua New Guinea	3	—	—	—	3	—	—
Auric Air	Tanzania	1	1	—	—	2	—	—
Aurora	Russia	—	2	1	5	8	—	—
Bank of Mexico	Mexico	—	1	—	—	1	—	—
Berry Aviation	United States	—	5	—	—	5	—	—
Bighorn Airways	United States	3	2	—	—	5	—	—
Biman Bangladesh Airlines	Bangladesh	—	—	—	5	5	2	—
Blue Bird Aviation	Yemen	3	1	—	—	4	—	—
Bluebird Aviation	Kenya	4	—	—	4	8	—	—
Camair-Co	Cameroon	—	—	—	2	2	—	—
CemAir	South Africa	1	—	2	4	7	—	—
Central Mountain Air	Canada	4	—	6	1	11	—	—
Chrono Aviation	Canada	2	—	—	—	2	—	—
Conair Group	Canada	—	—	—	18	18	—	—
Congo Airways	Democratic Republic of the Congo	—	—	—	2	2	—	—
ConocoPhillips	United States	—	—	—	3	3	—	—
Croatia Airlines	Croatia	—	—	—	3	3	—	—
Domestic Airlines	Algeria	—	4	—	4	8	—	—
Dynamic Aviation	United States	1	—	—	—	1	—	—
Eastafrican.com	Kenya	1	—	1	—	2	—	—
Ethiopian Airlines	Ethiopia	—	—	—	29	29	3	—
Falcon Aviation Services	United Arab Emirates	—	—	—	4	4	—	—
Fly540	Kenya	—	1	1	—	2	—	—
Flytec	Argentina	—	—	—	1	1	—	—
Government of Quebec	Canada	—	1	1	—	2	—	—
Great North Airlines	Canada	1	—	1	—	2	—	—
Heli Malongo Airways	Angola	—	—	—	1	1	—	—
Hydro-Québec	Canada	—	—	2	2	4	—	—
Icelandair	Iceland	—	3	—	3	6	—	—
Jambojet	Kenya	—	—	—	11	11	—	—
Jazz Aviation (Note: Operated for Air Canada Express)	Canada	—	—	—	35	35	—	—
LAM Mozambique Airlines	Mozambique	—	—	—	1	1	—	—
Luxair	Luxembourg	—	—	—	10	10	—	—
Luxwing	Malta	—	—	—	3	3	—	—
Maldivian	Maldives	—	1	5	—	6	—	—
Maroomba Airlines	Australia	1	—	5	—	6	—	—
National Jet Express	Australia	—	—	—	12	12	—	—
Nexus Airlines	Australia	—	—	—	5	5	—	—
North Cariboo Air	Canada	—	—	2	—	2	—	—
Nouvelle Air Affaires Gabon	Gabon	—	—	1	—	1	—	—
Olympic Air	Greece	2	—	—	—	2	—	—
PAL Airlines (Note: Operated for Air Canada Express)	Canada	2	—	3	14	19	—	—
PAL Aerospace	Canada	5	—	1		6	—	—
PAL Express	Philippines	—	—	—	11	11	4	—
Passion Air	Ghana	—	—	3	2	5	—	—
Perimeter Aviation	Canada	8	—	9	—	17	—	—
Petro Air	Libya	—	—	2	—	2	—	—
Petroleum Air Services	Egypt	—	—	5	—	5	—	—
Polar Airlines	Russia	—	—	3	—	3	—	—
Porter Airlines	Canada	—	—	—	29	29	—	—
Prime Aviation	Kazakhstan	—	—	1	—	1	—	—
QantasLink	Australia	—	—	—	41	41	—	—
RwandAir	Rwanda	—	—	—	2	2	—	—
Ryukyu Air Commuter	Japan	—	—	—	5	5	—	—
Safarilink Aviation	Kenya	1	1	2	—	4	—	—
SATA Air Açores	Portugal	—	2	—	5	7	—	—
Shree Airlines	Nepal	—	—	—	7	7	—	—
Skippers Aviation	Australia	4	—	6	—	10	—	—
Skytrans	Australia	5	2	2	—	9	—	—
Skyward Express	Kenya	2	1	1	2	6	—	—
SpiceJet	India	—	—	—	24	24	25	25
Star Perú	Peru	—	—	—	2	2	—	—
Summit Air	Canada	3	—	2	—	5	—	—
Sunwest Aviation	Canada	—	1	2	—	3	—	—
TAAG Angola Airlines	Angola	—	—	—	6	6	—	—
Universal Air	Malta	1	—	—	3	4	—	2
VietJetAir Qazaqstan	Kazakhstan	—	—	—	5	5	2	—
Voyageur Airways	Canada	10	—	14	1	25	—	—
Wasaya Airways	Canada	1	—	2	—	3	—	—
WestJet Encore	Canada	—	—	—	35	35	—	—
Widerøe	Norway	22	4	3	18	47	—	—
Total		134	47	135	438	724	36	31

== Former civil operators ==
Airline	Country	-100	-200	-300	-400	Total
Air Alliance	Canada	8	—	—	—	8
Air Atlantic	Canada	22	—	—	—	22
Air Atonabee (City Express)	Canada	7	—	—	—	7
Air BC	Canada	18	—	8	—	26
Air Berlin	Germany	—	—	—	20	20
Air Dolomiti	Italy	—	—	3	—	3
Air Nostrum	Spain	—	—	19	—	19
Air Nova	Canada	29	—	2	—	31
Air Ontario	Canada	27	—	6	—	33
Air Panama	Panama	—	—	1	—	1
Air Sénégal International	Senegal	2	—	1	—	3
Air Service Gabon	Gabon	6	—	1	—	7
Air Southwest	United Kingdom	—	—	7	—	7
Air Wisconsin	United States	5	—	7	—	12
airBaltic	Latvia	—	—	—	12	12
Province of Alberta, Department Of Public Works	Canada	1	—	—	—	1
ALM Antillean Airlines	Netherlands	—	—	6	—	6
AmakUnited States Airlines	Japan	1	—	—	—	1
America West Airlines	United States	12	1	—	—	13
Ansett New Zealand	New Zealand	7	—	2	—	9
Arctic Sunwest Charters (8199400 Canada)	Canada	2	—	—	—	2
Augsburg Airways	Germany	5	2	11	10	28
Austrian Airlines (Tyrolean Airways)	Austria	14	—	22	18	54
Avmax Aircraft Leasing	Canada	48	19	34	1	102
Bahamasair	Bahamas	—	—	9	—	9
Bombardier Inc.	Canada	3	4	23	296	326
Buraq Air	Libya	—	—	1	—	1
Canadian North	Canada	4	—	1	—	5
Colgan Air	United States	—	—	—	32	32
CommuteAir	United States	—	16	6	—	22
Connect Airlines	United States	—	—	—	2	2
Darwin Airline	Switzerland	—	—	—	2	2
Denim Air	Netherlands	—	—	1	—	1
Dutch Caribbean Airlines	Netherlands	—	—	2	—	2
Eastern Airways	United Kingdom	—	—	3	—	3
Eznis Airways	Mongolia	—	—	—	2	2
Field Aviation Company	Canada	2	16	22	—	30
Flybe (1979–2020)	United Kingdom	—	3	11	79	93
Flybe (2022–2023)	United Kingdom	—	—	—	10	10
FlyViking	Norway	3	—	—	—	3
Freedom Airlines	United States	12	—	—	—	12
GMG Airlines	Bangladesh	3	—	2	—	5
Hawkair	Canada	7	—	2	—	9
Henson Airlines	United States	40	—	—	—	40
Horizon Air	United States	24	28	—	56	108
InterSky	Austria	—	—	5	—	5
Island Air (Hawaii)	United States	13	3	—	8	24
Japan Air Commuter	Japan	—	—	—	11	11
Jeju Air	South Korea	—	—	—	5	5
Jetstar	Australia	—	—	5	—	5
LAN Colombia	Colombia	—	9	—	4	13
LC Perú	Peru	—	6	—	3	9
LIAT20	Antigua and Barbuda	12	—	17	—	29
LOT Polish Airlines	Poland	—	—	—	12	12
Lynx Aviation	United States	—	—	—	11	11
Malév Hungarian Airlines	Hungary	—	—	—	4	4
Medavia	Malta	2	—	2	—	4
Mesa Airlines	United States	—	16	7	—	23
Mesaba Airlines	United States	25	—	—	—	25
Metro Airlines	United States	9	—	—	—	9
Nav Canada	Canada	1	—	—	—	1
NorOntair (Air-Dale Limited)	Canada	2	—	—	—	2
Origin Pacific Airways	New Zealand	3	—	2	—	5
Pena Transportes Aéreos	Brazil	—	—	2	—	2
Piedmont Airlines	United States	77	19	12	—	108
Proflight Zambia	Zambia	—	—	1	—	1
R1 Airlines	Canada	21	7	7	—	35
Ravn Alaska	United States	10	—	1	—	11
Regent Airways	Bangladesh	—	—	2	—	2
Republic Airline	United States	—	—	—	31	31
Royal Jordanian Airlines	Jordan	—	—	—	2	2
Scandinavian Airlines	Sweden	—	—	—	28	28
Silverstone Air	Kenya	2	—	3	—	5
Sky Regional	Canada	—	—	—	5	5
Skyservices Limited	Canada	1	—	—	—	1
SkyWork Airlines	Switzerland	—	—	—	3	3
South African Express	South Africa	—	—	13	10	23
Southern Star Airlines	South Sudan	1	—	—	—	1
Starbow	Ghana	—	—	—	1	1
Surinam Airways	Suriname	—	—	1	—	1
Trans Nation Airways	Ethiopia	—	1	—	—	1
Transportes Aéreos Regionais da Bacia Amazônica	Brazil	—	—	6	—	6
Tavaj Linhas Aéreas	Brazil	—	2	—	—	2
Time Air	Canada	12	—	20	—	32
Uni Air	Taiwan	—	1	13	—	14
United Airways	Bangladesh	2	—	—	—	2
Vincent Aviation	New Zealand	1	—	—	—	1
Wings Air	Indonesia	—	—	3	—	3
Yemenia Joint Venture (YJV)	Yemen	3	—	—	—	3
Total	495	136	309	676	1,616	

=== Remarks ===
- Air Wisconsin operating as United Express via a code sharing agreement with United Airlines
- Mesa Airlines operating as America West Express via a code sharing agreement with America West Airlines and later as US Airways Express via a code sharing agreement with US Airways and also as United Express via a code sharing agreement with United Airlines
- Colgan Air operating Q400 aircraft as Continental Connection via a code sharing agreement with Continental Airlines and later as United Express via a code sharing agreement with United Airlines
- CommuteAir operating as Continental Express via code sharing agreement with Continental Airlines
- Freedom Airlines operating as the Delta Connection via a code sharing agreement with Delta Air Lines
- Henson Airlines operating as US Airways Express via a code sharing agreement with US Airways
- Island Air (formerly operated DHC-8-100 aircraft that were subsequently removed from the fleet and now operates Q400 aircraft)
- Lynx Aviation operating code sharing flights with Q400 aircraft on behalf of Frontier Airlines
- Mesaba Airlines operating as Northwest Airlink via a code sharing agreement with Northwest Airlines
- Metro Airlines operating as Eastern Metro Express via a code sharing agreement with Eastern Air Lines
- A short lived Bangladeshi Regional Airline Royal Bengal Airline also operated with a single Dash 8-100

== Coast guard, border guard and military operators ==
Operator	Country	Number	Model	Role	Ref
Dutch Caribbean Coast Guard	Netherlands	2	MPA-D8	Maritime surveillance, based at Curaçao - Hato Air Base	
Netherlands Coastguard	Netherlands	2	MPA-D8	Maritime surveillance, based at Amsterdam Airport Schiphol	
Australian Border Force	Australia	10	-200 (6) -300 (4)	Maritime surveillance	
Royal Australian Navy	Australia	1	-200	Hydrographic survey	
Royal Canadian Air Force	Canada	4	CT-142 "Gonzo"	Navigational trainer	
Royal Canadian Air Force	Canada	3	CT-142Q "Citadel"	Air Combat Systems Officers and Airborne Electronic Sensor Operators trainer	
Government of Canada, Department Of Transport	Canada	3	-100 (3)	Maritime surveillance (National Aerial Surveillance Program) on behalf of the Canadian Coast Guard DHC-8M-10(X)	
Icelandic Coast Guard	Iceland	1	-300 MSA	Maritime surveillance	
Japan Coast Guard	Japan	7	-300 MSA	Maritime surveillance	
Kenya Air Force	Kenya	3	-100	Medium lift transport	
Mexican Navy	Mexico	1	-202	Utility transport	
Swedish Coast Guard	Sweden	3	-300 MSA	Maritime surveillance	
Home Office	United Kingdom	2	-315 ISR	Maritime patrol / Surveillance aircraft	
United States Air Force	United States	2	E-9A Widget	Surveillance aircraft	
United States Army	United States	13	RO-6A	Surveillance aircraft	
United States Army	United States	2	C-147A	Parachute drop aircraft	
U.S. Customs and Border Protection	United States	7	-200 (4) -300 MPA (3)	Maritime patrol	

== Other applications ==
Two used Q400s, acquired from Scandinavian Airlines System, were modified by Cascade Aerospace of Abbotsford, British Columbia, Canada for France's Sécurité Civile as fire-fighting water bombers in the fire season and as transport aircraft off season. The Q400 Airtanker can drop 10,000 L (2,200 imp gal; 2,600 US gal) of water in this role compared to De Havilland Canada's CL-415 dedicated water bomber which can drop 6,140 L (1,350 imp gal; 1,620 US gal). The latter, however, is an amphibious aircraft and requires less infrastructure.

The National Police of Colombia operates a single De Havilland Dash 8-300 for utility transport.

Neptune Aviation of Missoula, Montana have acquired a Q300 as a prototype for future Q200/Q300 water bombers to replace current Lockheed P-2 Neptune aircraft.

The United States Department of State operates seven Dash 8-300 aircraft.
