= WingTips Airport Services =

- Industry: Aviation (Outsourcing)
- Founded: 1990, Sold August 2010 to Air Terminal Services (ATS)
- Headquarters: Calgary, Alberta, Canada
- Key people: Chris Richardson, President & CEO
- Products: Aircraft ground handling
- Website: http://www.wingtips.ca/

WingTips Airport Services (WingTips) was a company offering airline representation for ground services at Calgary International Airport. It was owned by C N Richardson Marketing Ltd and was founded in Calgary, Alberta in 1990, by Chris Richardson.

== History ==
WingTips began offering passenger services in March 2001, beginning with a contract with Roots Air. WingTips went on to represent Canadian North Airlines.

The company had 20 full-time staff and had 20 part-time. WingTips had also represented Jetsgo, CanJet and Hawkair. WingTips also had earned the contract to represent Big Sky Airlines in October 2005; however, the airline pulled out of Calgary before starting its service to Boise, Idaho and Billings, Montana.

WingTips did not receive the contract from British Airways when it commenced service in December 2006. Instead, British Airways chose Servisair to represent them in Calgary.

In 2006, WingTips was awarded the contract for Aeromexico to provide passenger services; the airline which was contracted by Sunwing Airlines to provide seasonal service to Cancun. The contract only lasted one year as Sunwing began using its own fleet of Boeing 737 aircraft and again chose Servisair to represent them.

== Competition ==
Servisair is the main competitor in Calgary. Servisair has a competitive edge because not only does it offer above wing passenger service, it also offers ramp services; thus airlines only having one company work their flight instead of two.

Airport Terminal Services (ATS) began offering passenger services in March 2007 when it was awarded the contract for Northwest Airlines. As of August 2010 Airport Terminal Services (ATS) purchased WingTips and integrated its service into Airport Terminal Services (ATS).

== Airlines ==
WingTips was representing the following airlines:

- Air North
- Canadian North
- EnerJet
- KLM
- Lufthansa
- Monarch Airlines
- Thomas Cook Airlines

== Services ==
WingTips offered passenger services for smaller and seasonal airlines operating to Calgary International Airport. These services include airline/airport representation, load planning, and passenger services.

== Location ==
WingTips Administrative Office was located on the second floor of the Delta Calgary Airport Hotel. WingTips Terminal Office was found on Departures Level, Area B, Main Terminal, Calgary International Airport.

== Sale ==
Wingtips was purchased by Airport Terminal Services (ATS) in August 2010 with Chris Richardson staying on as a consultant in Calgary. Richardson died in June 2012.
