= Bristol Freighter =

Twin-engine freighter and airliner

Type 170 Freighter / Wayfarer
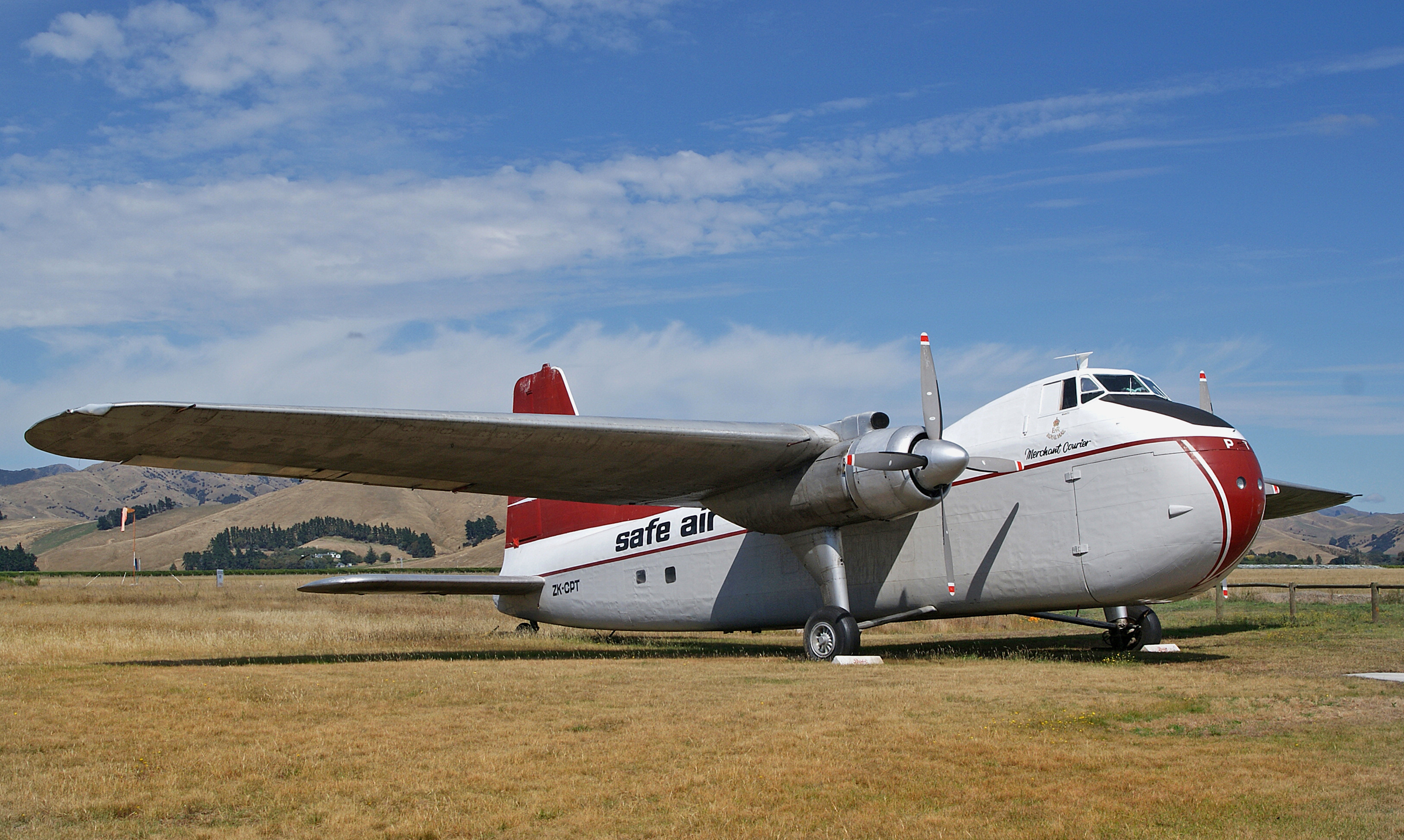
- Bristol Freighter at Omaka Aviation Heritage Centre, 2011

General information
- Type: Cargo aircraft
- National origin: United Kingdom
- Manufacturer: Bristol Aeroplane Company
- Status: Retired
- Primary user: Silver City Airways; British European Airways (historical)
- Number built: 214

History
- Manufactured: 1945–1958
- Introduction date: 1946
- First flight: 2 December 1945
- Variant: Bristol Superfreighter

The Bristol Type 170 Freighter is a British twin-engine aircraft designed and built by the Bristol Aeroplane Company as both a freighter and airliner. Its best known use was as an air ferry to carry cars and their passengers over relatively short distances. A passenger-only version was also produced, known as the Wayfarer. It was powered by twin 2000 hp 14-cylinder piston engines matched to 4-bladed propellers. It had wide opening clamshell doors on the nose, and with a high-set flight deck, this allowed full access to the cargo bay, including the ability to drive a vehicle directly in via a ramp.

The Freighter was developed during the Second World War, having attracted official attention from the British Air Ministry. They sought the development of a rugged aircraft capable of carrying various cargoes, including a 3-ton truck. Various changes to the design were made to accommodate their requirements, but it was completed too late to participate in the conflict; its first flight was in December 1945. The majority of sales of the Freighter were to commercial operators after the war, but it did have military service with several Air Forces.

In response to customer demand, an enlarged version to maximize vehicle-carrying capacity, known as the Bristol Superfreighter, was developed. By the end of production in 1958, 214 had been produced, and though all but retired in the 21st century it can be found preserved in aviation museums in the United Kingdom and internationally.

== Development ==
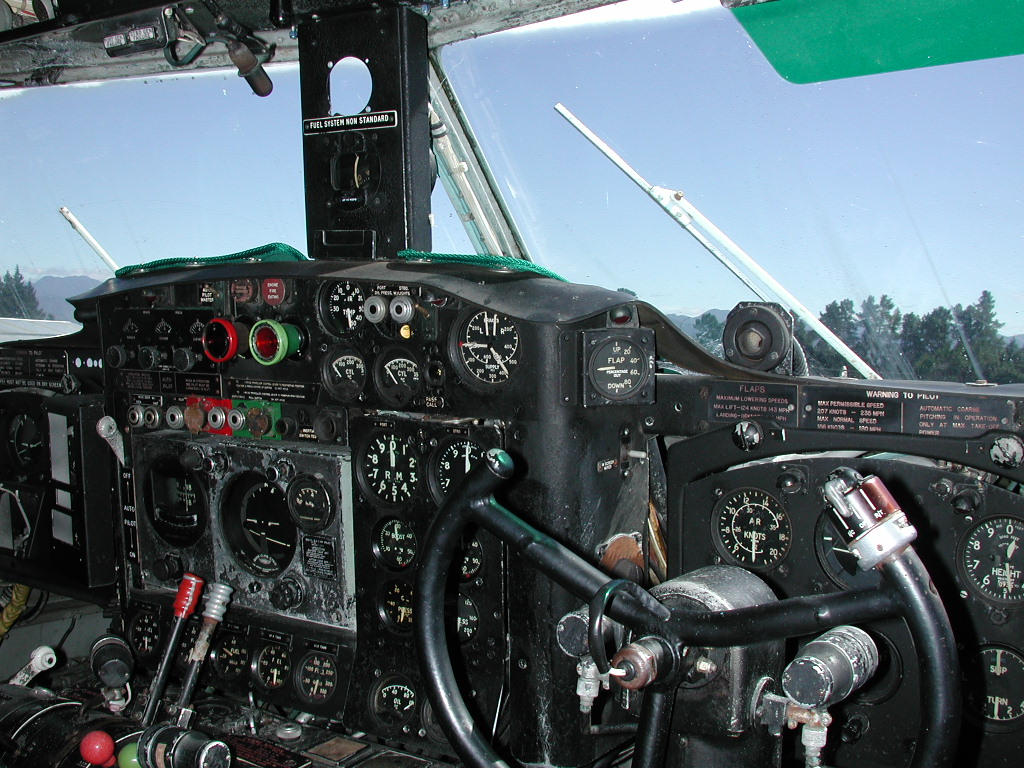
Bristol Freighter cockpit

The Bristol Type 170 was designed as a stop-gap project to provide work for the Bristol Aeroplane Company while the Bristol Brabazon was under development. Subsequently, the British Air Ministry expressed interest in the project, believing that it would provide a rugged transport aircraft capable of using unimproved airstrips; accordingly, a pair of prototypes were ordered on the condition that the design was modified so that it would be compatible with the air-transporting of a British Army 3-ton truck. For this requirement, the Air Ministry formulated and issued Specification 22/44 (which was later revised as C.9/45) around the envisioned design.

As proposed, the aircraft was an all-metal, twin-engine high-wing monoplane based on the pre-war Bristol Bombay, having wings of the same section and taper but with a swept leading edge and straight trailing edge with two spars in place of the seven used in the Bombay. The square-section fuselage was clear of internal obstructions; in the original design this was to be loaded via a trapdoor in the nose, but the Air Ministry requirements necessitated a change to clamshell doors in the nose. Considerable effort was made to maximise the usable internal volume of the aircraft in order to readily accommodate the carriage of bulky cargoes. The flight deck was elevated above the load space on the nose as to not obstruct access; the crew would enter the flight deck via a fixed vertical ladder on the side of the cargo bay. Power was to have been provided by a pair of a development of the Bristol Perseus using nine Bristol Centaurus cylinders, each engine rated at 1,150 hp (860 kW).

Early on, it had been envisioned that the Freighter would play a logistical role in the South-East Asian theatre of World War II. However, as it was becoming clear that the conflict would be over before the aircraft could enter service, an increasing emphasis was placed on suiting the aircraft to meet the demands of civilian operators. A cost analysis demonstrated that for civil use, it would be more economic to increase the all-up weight of the design from 30,000 to 35,000 lb (14,000 to 16,000 kg) and to adopt the more powerful Bristol Hercules engine to power the Freighter. It was also considered that there would be a market for a passenger aircraft suitable for use from basic airstrips, and so a version without the nose doors and capable of carrying up to 36 passengers, to be known as the Wayfarer, was proposed.

The prototype (G-AGPV) made its first flight on 2 December 1945, flying from Bristol Filton Aerodrome piloted by Cyril Uwins. Cyril found the aircraft to be generally satisfactory, but requested that the tailplane be lowered and increased in span as to enable the aircraft be trimmed to fly "hands off" over a wide range of centre of gravity positions.

== Design ==
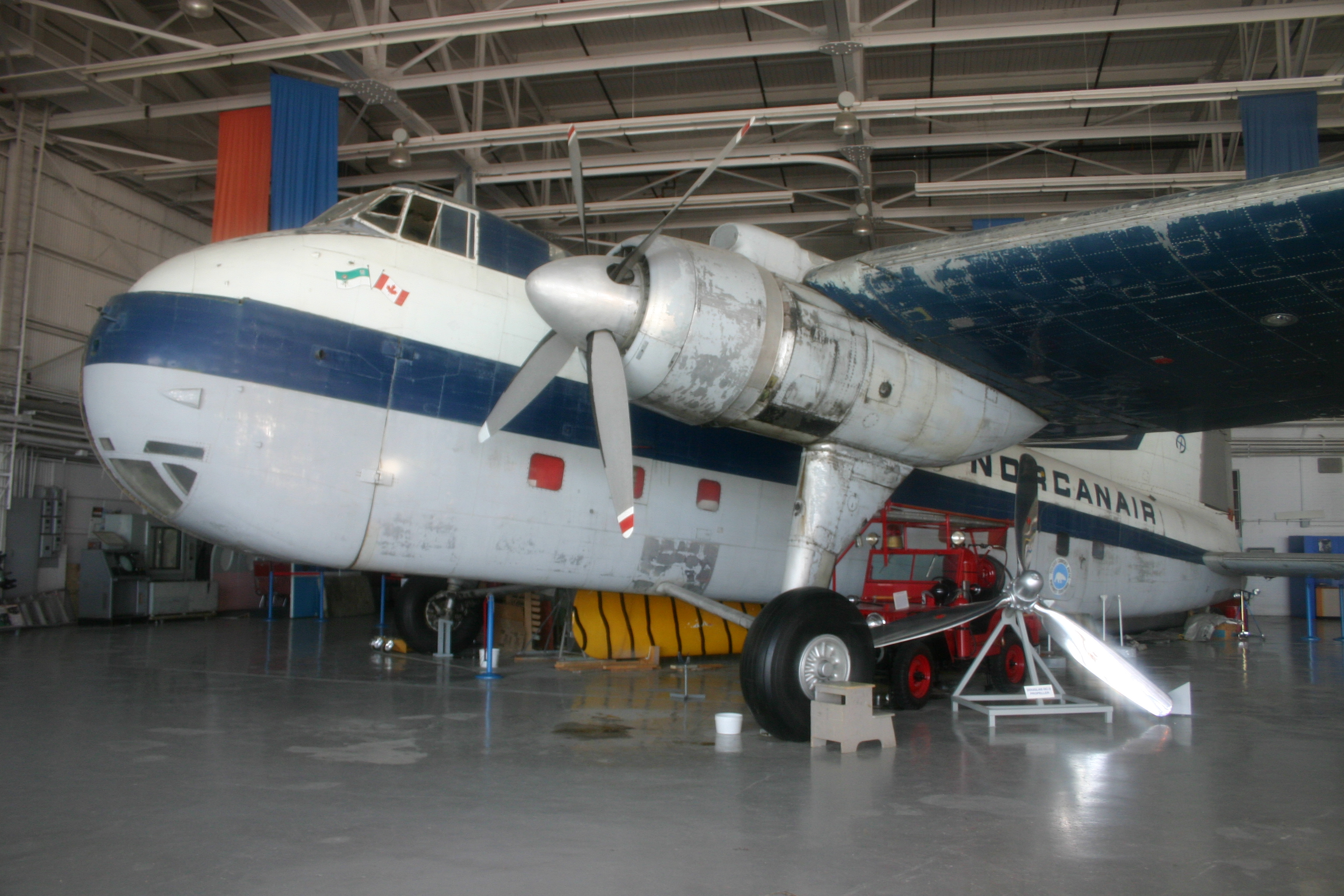
Bristol Freighter 31M in Norcanair markings at the Western Canada Aviation Museum in Winnipeg, Manitoba, 2007

The Bristol Type 170 Freighter was a twin-engine, high mounted-wing monoplane that was developed specifically for the economic carriage of freight by air. It was a visually distinctive aircraft, possessing a 'boxy' fuselage, rounded nose, and a high-set flight deck. In order to maximise the economical performance of the Freighter, compromises were implemented on other aspects of performance, resulting in a relatively low cruising speed; this was not viewed as being of importance to the role of a freighter and thus not a major diminishing factor. According to aviation publication Flight, the economics of the Freighter were judged to be a major factor of its market appeal, as well as the wider economic situation of the UK at this time.

Operationally, the Freighter was intended to be employed upon high-frequency short distance routes. Being flown at the low speeds and short ranges for which the aircraft was intended, the fuel economy improvements that would be provided by a retractable undercarriage was outweighed by the increase in structural weight; therefore, it was decided that a fixed undercarriage would be used, which also had the benefits of reduced production and maintenance costs. The combination of a high-mounted wing and fixed undercarriage was considered to be atypical for the era, and resulted in greater drag than a low-mounted counterpart would have. The main undercarriage comprised two vertical legs, braced by two horizontal struts.

The lower nose of the Freighter was covered by a pair of large clamshell doors, for easy access to the main hold; as a direct consequence of this arrangement, the unpressurised fuselage was somewhat breezy during flight. The doors, which are hinged outwards, led into a main hold that had an internal volume of 2,020 cu ft; it was capable of being loaded with heavy payloads, up to a maximum of 350 cu ft per ton. To better facilitate loading, a built-in hoist is installed on the fixed upper surface of the nose, which reduced the need for airport-based infrastructure. Fixed restraining points to secure payloads are present throughout the internal space. On the passenger-carrying Wayfarer variant, the nose-mounted doors were substituted by a fixed shell and the area immediately behind would be used either as a cargo hold or galley.

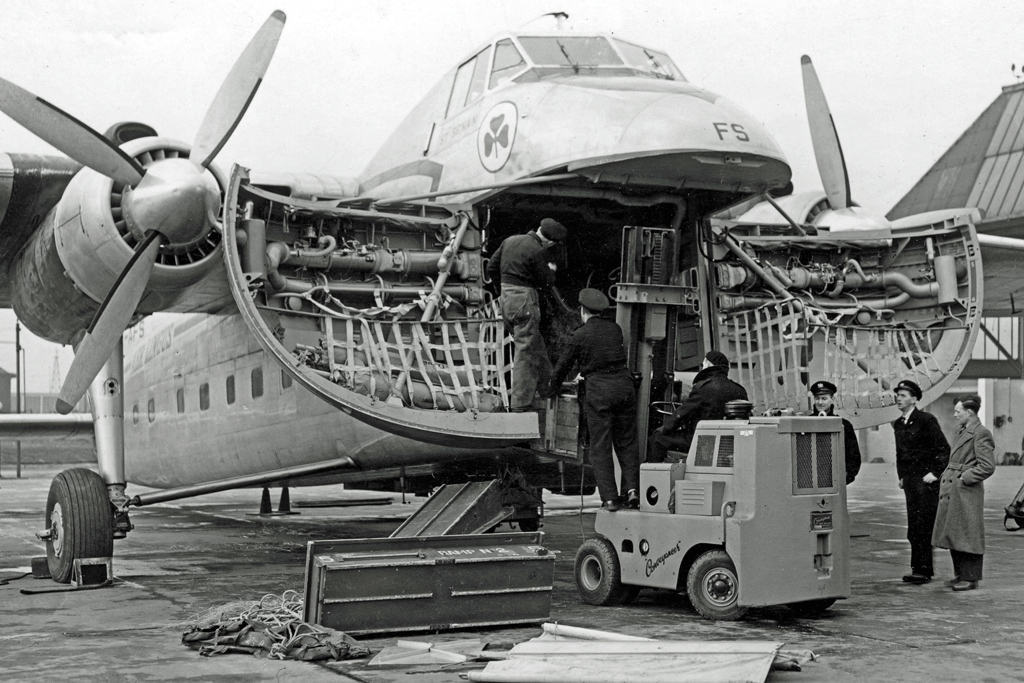
Bristol Freighter operated by Aer Lingus being loaded through the clamshell nose doors in 1952

The flight deck of the Freighter was positioned in an elevated position, directly above the clamshell doors. In addition to providing a good all-round view for the flight crew, this placement kept the flight deck clear of the loading activity below. Flight stated of the cockpit: "The control and instrument layout is quite the best we have seen in any Bristol aircraft". The major controls are typically comfortable and smooth, while each pilot is provided with a standard blind-flying panel. Instrumentation fittings differed dependent upon customer specification, but a Sperry Corporation-built autopilot would typically be installed. The flight deck was typically operated by a two-man crew, a first pilot and second pilot or radio operator; in addition, space was provided at the rear for a third crew member.

The Bristol Hercules 734 radial engines that powered the type, along with all of its major subsystems such as the cowling, oil tank, cooler and control cables, could also be easily detached for servicing; an entire engine replacement could be performed within 90 minutes. The fuel system is uncomplicated, being contained within a pair of 300-gallon fuel tanks positioned in the interspar bays of the wings; neither fuel tanks or hydraulic pipelines were present in the outer wings. The only elements needing hydraulic systems were the clamshell doors and flaps. The electrically controlled carburation system had three different intakes, each suited to starting the engine under different conditions – these being hot, sub-zero, and temperate climates.

The airframe itself is deliberately simple in its construction, while the use of maintenance-intensive components was kept to an absolute minimum and, where necessary, these were made as accessible and readily serviceable as possible. Manufacturing of the Freighter was eased by many components being standardised and identical where feasible; this ideology was also applied to elements of the internal structure, such as the longerons, frames, and skin. The floor of the main hold is covered by wooden panels, designed to be easily replaceable in the event of damage; these were supported by a floor structure of deep transverse beams with a pair of longitudinal strips, strengthened by a support beam. Another ease-of-maintenance decision was to use cables for the control system where practical, while all flight control surfaces had fabric coverings, which was both light and easy to replace.

== Production history ==
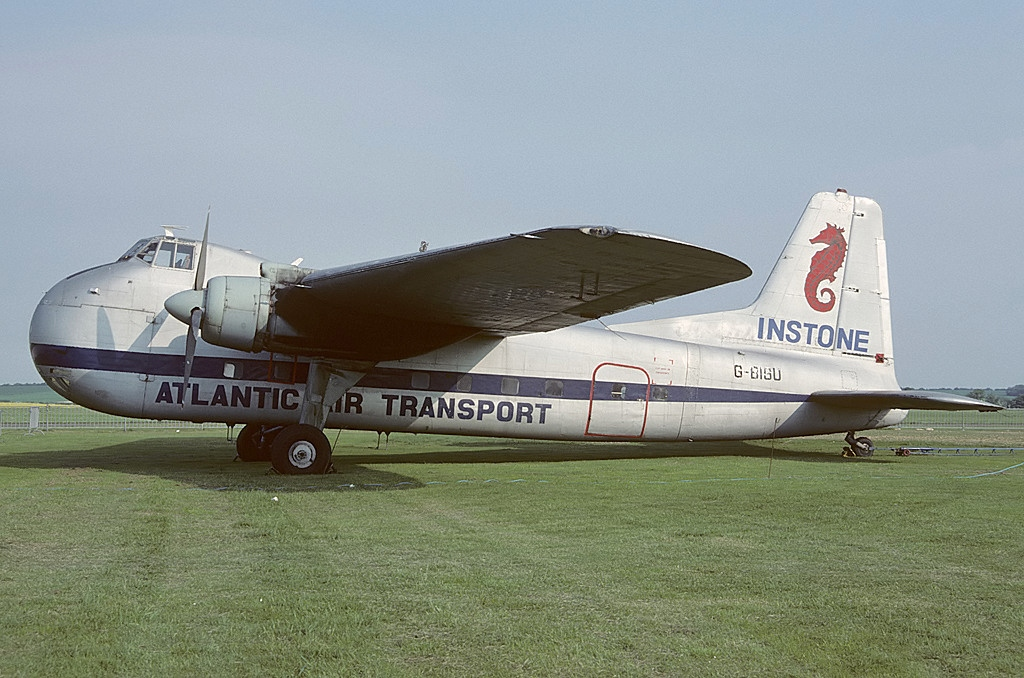
Bristol 170 Freighter Mk31 of Atlantic Air Transport

On 30 April 1946, the second prototype, which was also the first 34-seat Wayfarer, registered G-AGVB, made its first flight. It commenced proving flights to the Channel Islands, carrying over 10,000 passengers in six months. The third aircraft, registered G-AGVC, was the first Freighter I and had fully operational nose doors. After a number of demonstration flights around the world, the Bristol 170 entered full production. One of the first sales was to the Argentine Air Force, which ordered 15 aircraft.

The managing director of Silver City Airways was Wing Commander Griffith James Powell, who realised that he could adapt the Bristol Freighter to fly passengers with their cars from Britain to Continental Europe and Jersey. As an "air ferry", it would allow people going on holiday to avoid the lengthy waits and travel times involved in traditional sea ferries. On 14 July 1948, the airline made the first flight with a car, from Lympne Airport in Kent to Le Touquet on the northern coast of France. Silver City Airways would become one of its most prolific operators: during 1954, each Freighter in the company's fleet averaged 2,970 landings and take offs — in excess of eight sectors per day for every day of the year.

In 1953, production of the freighter was moved to Whitney Straight's Western Airways factory at Weston-super-Mare airport. A lengthened version, the Freighter 32, which featured movable wooden partitions in the cargo compartment, was introduced; it could be configured to carry either three 14 ft (3.3m) cars and 20 passengers or two larger vehicles and 12 passengers, the passenger seats being in the rear section of the fuselage. Silver City Airways dubbed this variant the Superfreighter and subsequently built an airport named "Ferryfield" at Lydd in Kent, beginning air ferry services in 1955. In the same year, Channel Air Bridge started operations from Southend, with four Bristol Freighters flying to Calais.

The last two Freighters of the 214 built were delivered in 1958, one to New Zealand in February and the last aircraft to Dan-Air in March 1958. The New Zealand aircraft was delivered to Straits Air Freight Express (SAFE), which eventually operated one of the largest fleets of Freighters. One of the lengthened aircraft, registered G-AMWA, had 60 seats fitted and was known as a Super Wayfarer.

== Operational history ==
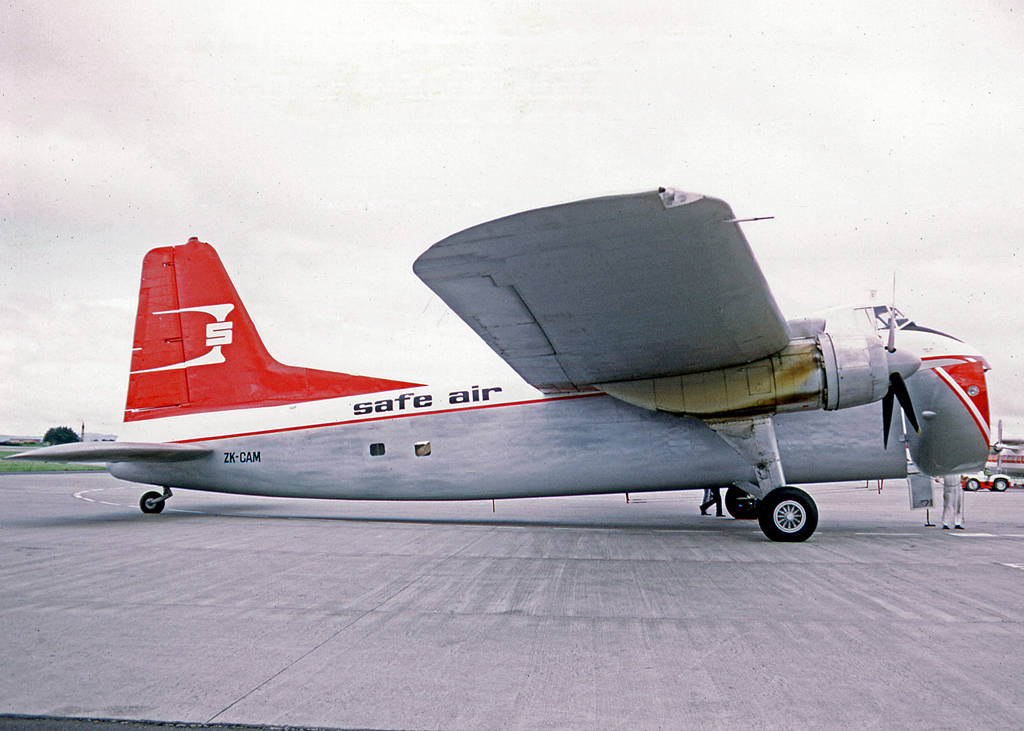
A Bristol 170 Series 31 Merchant Venturer of SAFE Air at Auckland International Airport in 1973. (doors open)

=== Civil users ===
In New Zealand SAFE Air moved rail freight from Wellington (the North Island) across the Cook Strait to Blenheim (the South Island) and back, using Bristol Freighters, starting in 1951. The airline later reconfigured its aircraft to accept palletised cargo loaded on patented "cargons". This was a first anywhere in the aviation world.

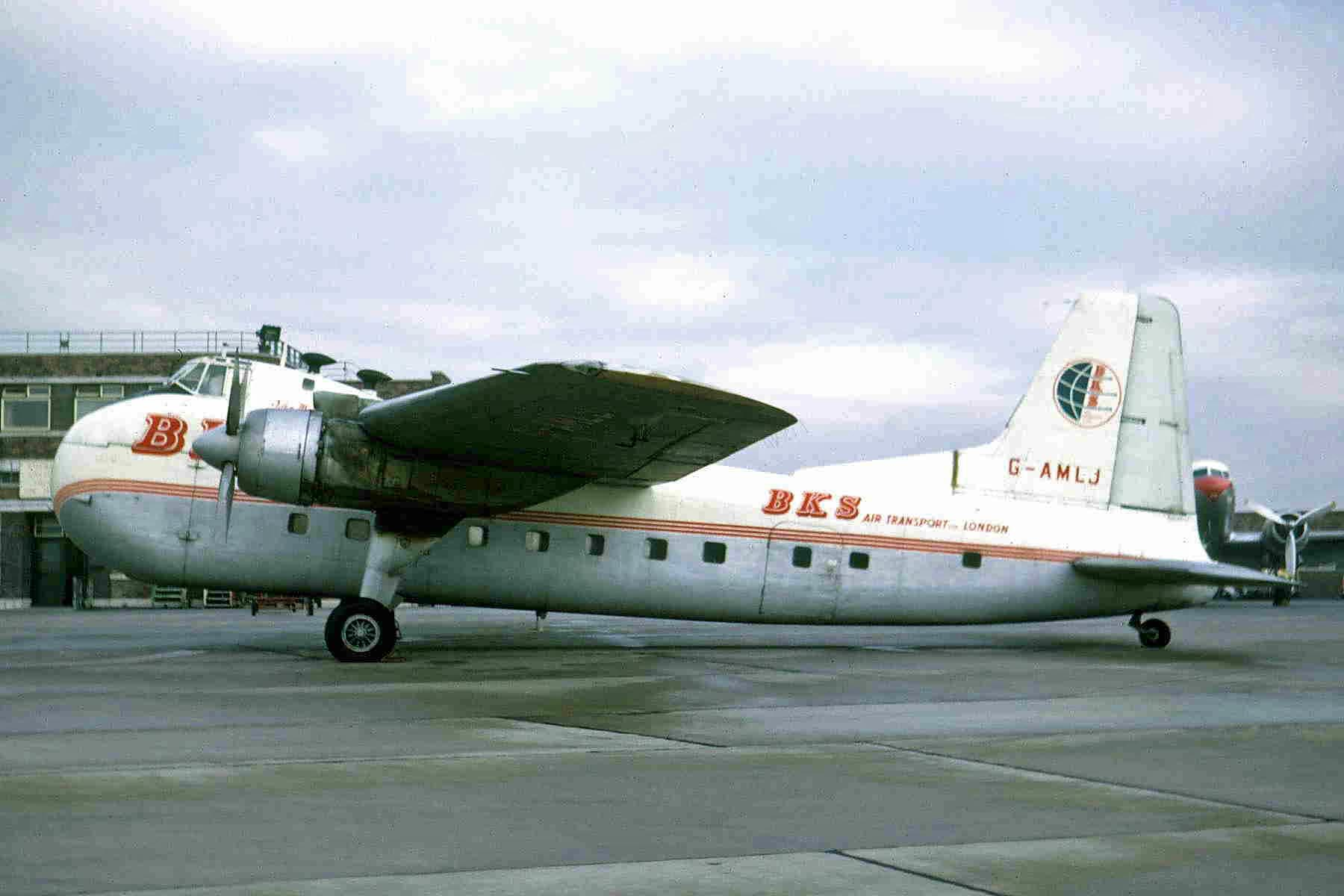
In commercial service at Liverpool, 1964

Cargons were loaded near the rail yards and their load was calculated and arranged to remain within the aircraft's load and centre of gravity limits. They were then trucked to the airport and placed on the Freighter using a mechanical loading device. The loader accepted cargons from horizontal-tray road vehicles and then raised them to the level of the aircraft's cargo deck on electrically powered screw-jacks. The pallets could then be rolled into the nose of the aircraft. Other adaptations allowed the carrying of horses and other high-value large animals.

Freighters were the major link between the Chatham Islands and mainland New Zealand until Armstrong Whitworth Argosy aircraft replaced them. SAFE Air developed a soundproofed "container" for the half of the aircraft given over to passengers on these flights. Bristol 170s were still in commercial use with SAFE until the late 1970s.

Trans Australian Airlines bought four MK31 or MK 32s from the Pakistan Air Force. Two were flown back to Sydney, Australia where they were rebuilt and then sent to New Guinea for TAA's Sunbird services, flying freight into the New Guinea highlands. One then went to Archerfield airport in Brisbane, Australia and was used for shipping crayfish from Tasmania.

=== Military users ===
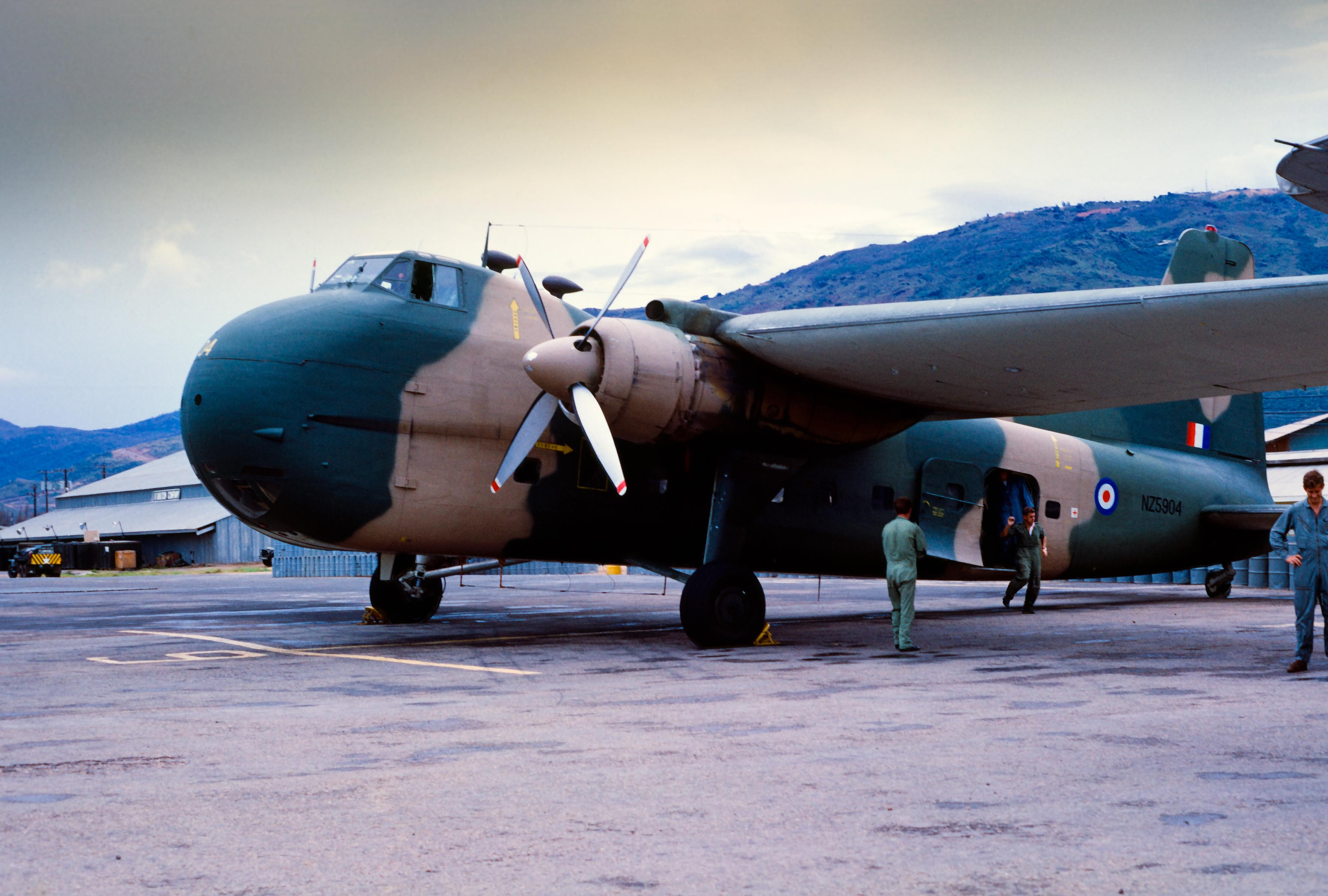
Bristol in military service, 1969

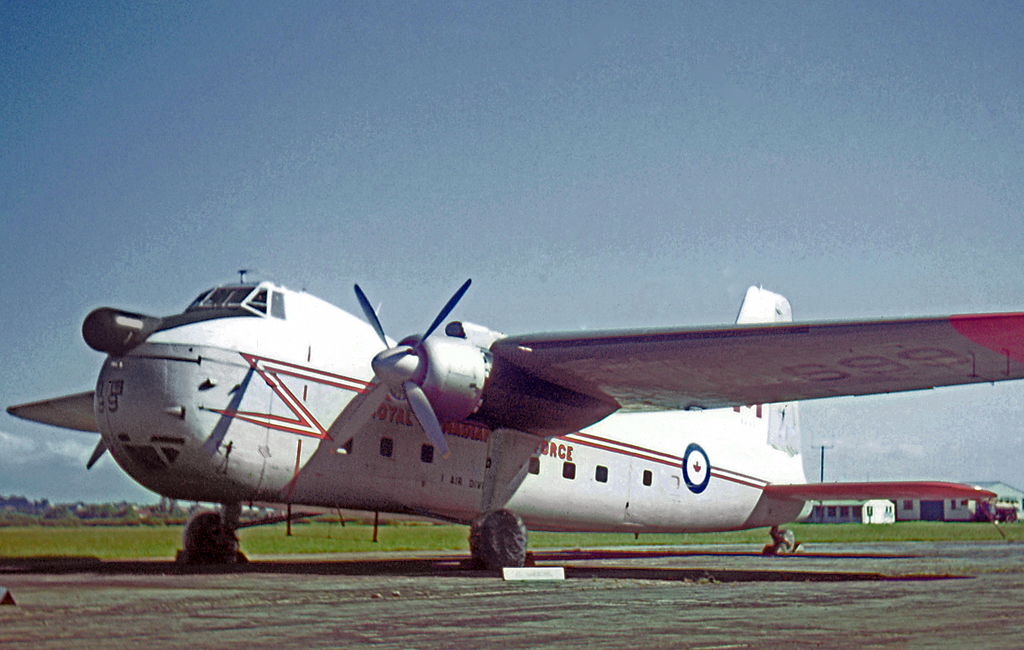
Royal Canadian Air Force Bristol 170 31M of the RCAFs European-based 1st Air Division in 1966

In military service, Bristol Freighters were operated by the air forces of Argentina, Australia, Burma, Canada, Pakistan and New Zealand. After withdrawal, some of the Pakistan aircraft were bought by SAFE Air and used in New Zealand. The Royal Canadian Air Force used five Freighters to carry spares and supplies between the United Kingdom and their bases in France and West Germany.

The Royal New Zealand Air Force ordered 12 Mk 31M Freighters in the late 1940s. RNZAF Freighters ranged as far as supplying the New Zealand Army in Malaya, the British High Commissions (and other support staff) in the Maldives, Ceylon, India and Nepal, performing Far East Air Force tasks in Malaya (often when other aircraft types were unserviceable owing to maintenance problems) and Hong Kong. They ran a highly reliable military shuttle service for allies in Thailand during the Vietnam War and served several other roles, being adapted for—amongst other things—aerial topdressing experiments, although to avoid competition with private enterprise, the New Zealand government did not use them in that role.

The airline Aigle Azur operated Bristol 170 Freighters in early 1950s French Indo-China. At least one aircraft was impressed by French authorities to fly supplies into the base at Dien Bien Phu.

=== Final days ===
The New Zealand Freighters were retired from military use when replaced by Hawker Siddeley Andovers in the 1970s. After retirement, a number of smaller local operators briefly flew Freighters. Some were exported to Canada. A SAFE Air Freighter is preserved in taxiable condition at Blenheim and another at the Royal New Zealand Air Force Museum in Christchurch. A third is on display at Founders Historical Park in Nelson, and a fourth, the only one of its kind in Europe, is in storage in Bristol, United Kingdom after being transported from Ardmore Airport (New Zealand) by Aerospace Bristol. Other Freighter airframes around New Zealand now serve as novelty tea-rooms, backpacker hostels, and motel rooms, such as one in Ōtorohanga.

One Freighter was in service in turn with British Ministry of Supply, the Royal Australian Air Force and subsequently went into commercial use in Australia until 1978 after which it went on to become a museum exhibit and was given over to the RAAF Museum at Point Cook, Victoria, Australia in 1988.

Bristol freighter Mk 31M G-BISU was operated by Instone Airline at Stansted, Essex, UK, for a number of years. This was an ex-RNZAF aircraft and left Ardmore on 2 March 1981 for its 86-hour ferry flight to the UK. It subsequently flew its first charter flight on 3 August 1981 delivering two racehorses to Deauville. This role of flying livestock was to take up half a year, while other work included carriage of oil drilling machinery, car parts, newspapers and mail. Re-registered as C-FDFC, in 1996 it crashed on takeoff with the crew escaping, but was essentially a write-off. The captain, John Duncan, and co-pilot Malcolm Cutter reported that the aircraft entered a severe yaw after takeoff, which was uncontrollable despite use of full opposite aileron and rudder control. In trying to avoid collision the aircraft stalled.

The last Freighter in service, which flew for Instone Airline then later returned to New Zealand, was bought from surplus by Hawkair in Terrace, British Columbia, Canada. In 2004, this aircraft undertook its final ferry flight to the Reynolds-Alberta Museum in Wetaskiwin, Alberta.

== Variants ==
Freighter Mk I
Utility transport Series I or Freighter with a strengthened floor and hydraulically-operated nose doors.

Freighter Mk IA
Mixed-traffic variant with 16-passenger seats

Freighter Mk IB
Variant of Mk I for British European Airways

Freighter Mk IC
Variant of Mk IA for British European Airways

Freighter Mk ID
Variant of Mk IA for British South American Airways

Wayfarer Mk II
Airliner (passenger variant) Series II or Wayfarer. The nose doors were omitted and additional windows were added.

Wayfarer Mk IIA
Variant of Mk II with 32 seats

Wayfarer Mk IIB
Variant of Mk IIA for British European Airways

Wayfarer Mk IIC
Variant of Mk II with 20 seats and baggage hold

Freighter Mk XI
Variant of Mk I with 108 ft (32.92 m) wing and extra tankage.

Freighter Mk XIA
Mixed-traffic version of Mk IX

Freighter Mk 21
More powerful-engined version.

Freighter Mk 21E
Convertible version of Mk 21 with 32 removable seats

Freighter Mk 31
Variant of Mk 21 with larger tailfin.

Freighter Mk 31E
Convertible version of Mk 31

Freighter Mk 31M
Military version of Mk 31 with provision for supply dropping

Freighter Mk 32 (Bristol Superfreighter)
Higher-capacity version with fuselage lengthened by 5 ft (1.52 m).

Type 179 Freighter
Replacement for Freighter with a twin boom tail, not built.

Type 179A Freighter
As Type 179 but with an upswept rear fuselage and a ramp-loading door, not built.

Type 179B Freighter
Version of Type 179 with standard tail and powered by Centarus engines, not built.

Type 216
Freighter/car ferry replacement of Freighter. It was intended to be powered by a pair of Rolls-Royce Dart turboprop engines. Not built.

== Operators ==
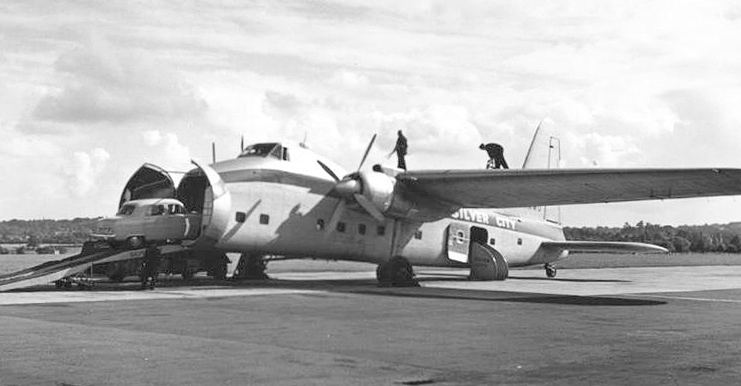
Silver City Airways Freighter 32 loading a car for Cherbourg at Southampton in September 1954

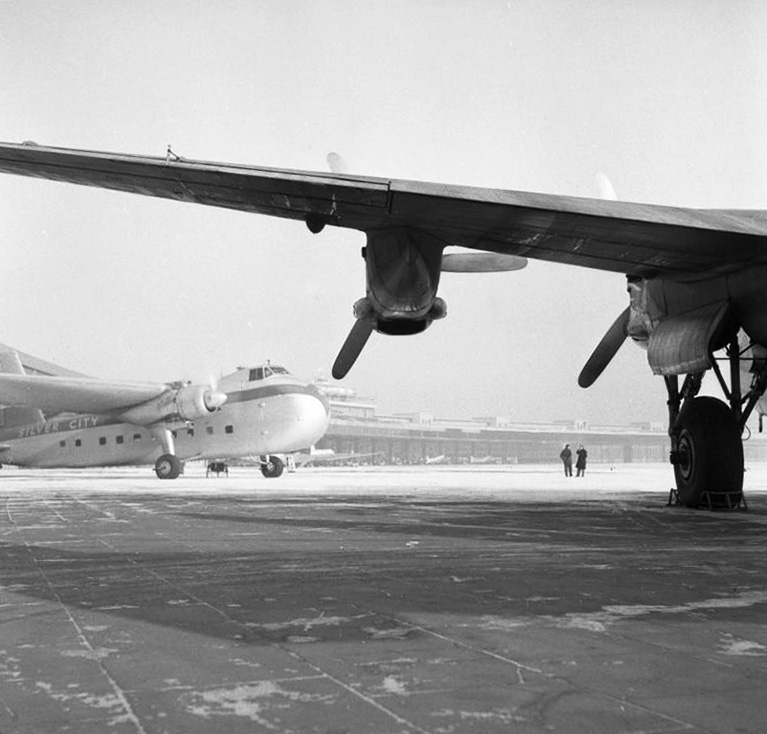
A Silver City Airways Bristol Freighter, viewed from under the wing of an Avro York at Berlin-Tempelhof, 1954

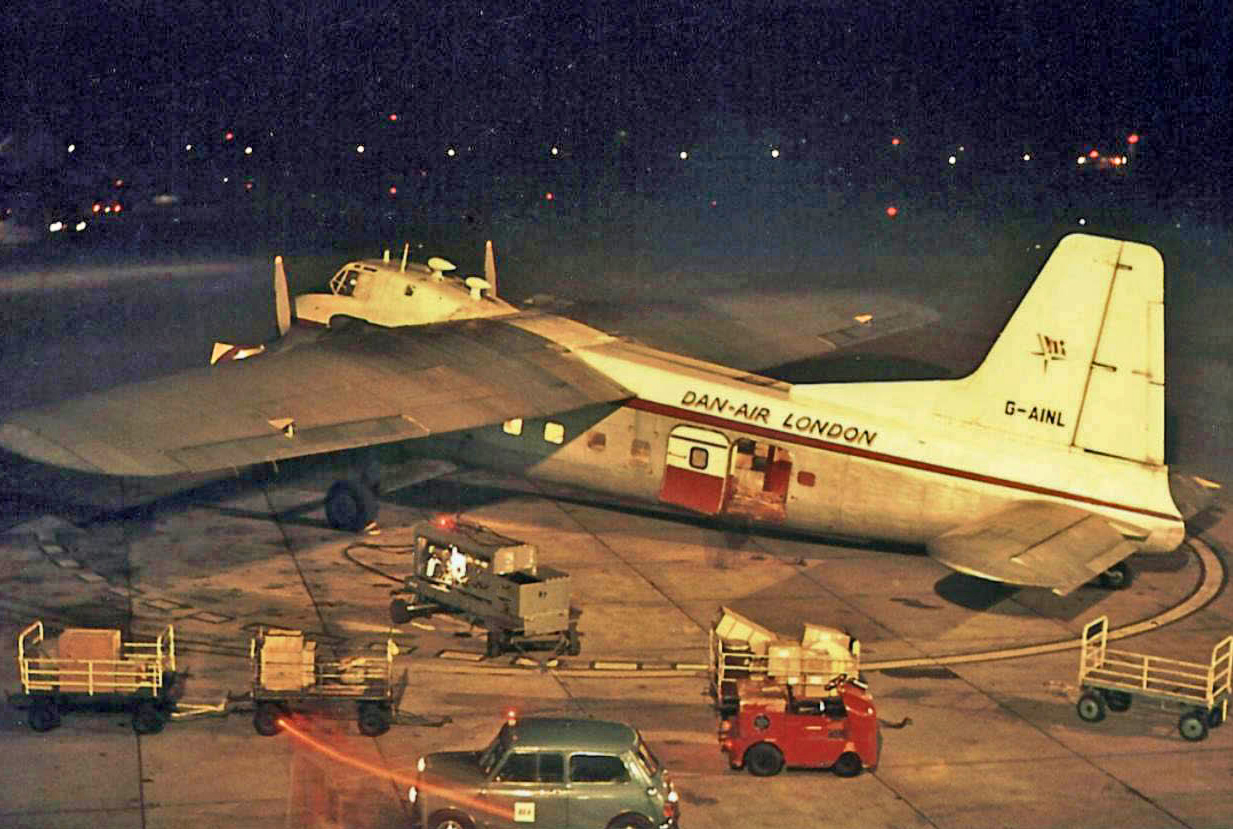
Bristol Freighter 31 of Dan-Air operating a cargo service at Manchester Airport in 1964.

=== Civil operators ===
Argentina

- Flota Aerea Mercante Argentina

Australia

- Air Express
- Ansett-ANA
- Ansett-MAL
- Australian National Airways
- Brain & Brown Airfreighters
- Jetair Australia
- Trans Australia Airlines

Belgium

- Avions Fairey
- SABENA

Brazil

- Real Transportes Aéreos

Canada

- Associated Airways
- Central Northern Airways
- Hawkair
- Lambair
- Maritime Central Airways
- North Canada Air
- Norcanair
- Pacific Western Airlines
- Transair
- Trans Canada Airlines
- Trans Provincial Airlines
- Wardair

Ecuador

- Shell Company of Ecuador

France

- Aigle Azur
- Air Atlas
- Air Djibouti (operated in French Somaliland)
- Air Fret
- Air Outremer
- Compagnie Air Transport
- Transports Aériens Intercontinentaux
- Corse Air
- Société Aérienne du Littoral
- Société Indochinoise de Transport Aériens
- Transportes Aériens Reunis

Germany

- LTU
- Panavia Ltd

India

- Bharat Airways
- Dalmia Jain Airways
- Indian National Airways

Ireland

- Aer Lingus
- Aer Turas

Italy

- Società Avio Trasporti Torino

Laos

- Air Laos

Lebanon

- Middle East Airlines

New Zealand

- Hercules Airline
- SAFE Air

Nigeria

- West African Airways Corporation

Rhodesia

- Central African Airways two aircraft delivered in 1948, both sold in 1949.

Saudi Arabia

- Saudi Arabian Airlines

Spain

- Aviaco
- Iberia

South Africa

- Suidair operated one Bristol Wayfarer.

Sweden

- Trafik-Turist-Transportflyg

United Kingdom

- Air Charter
- Air Ferry
- Air Kruise
- Airwork
- Autair
- Aviation Traders
- BKS Air Transport
- Britavia
- British Air Ferries
- British European Airways
- British United Air Ferries
- Channel Air Bridge
- Channel Airways
- Channel Island Airways
- Dan-Air
- Hunting Aerosurveys
- Instone Airlines
- Manx Airlines 1947–1958
- Midland Air Cargo
- Ministry of Civil Aviation
- Silver City Airways
- Trans European Aviation

Vietnam

- Air Vietnam

=== Military operators ===
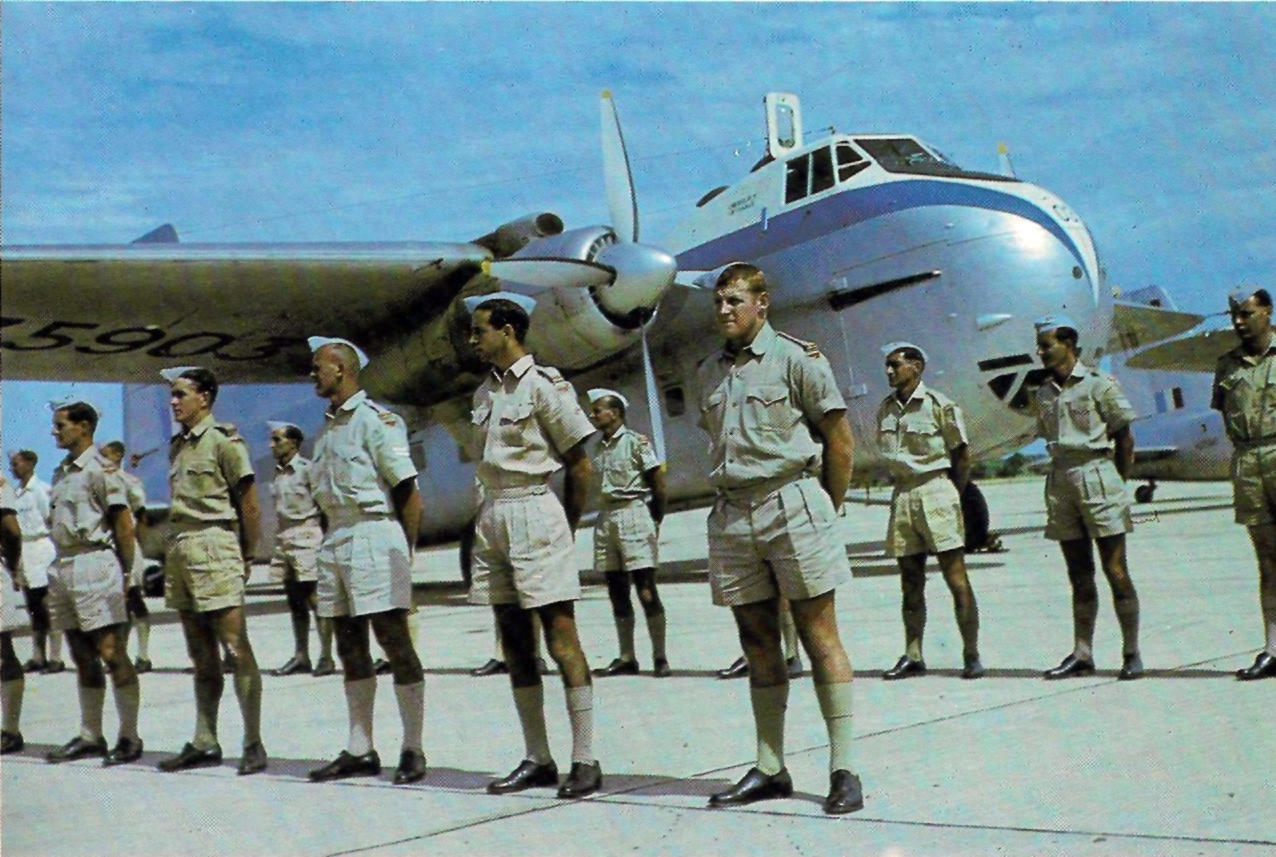
A 41 Squadron RNZAF Bristol Freighter in Thailand, 1962.

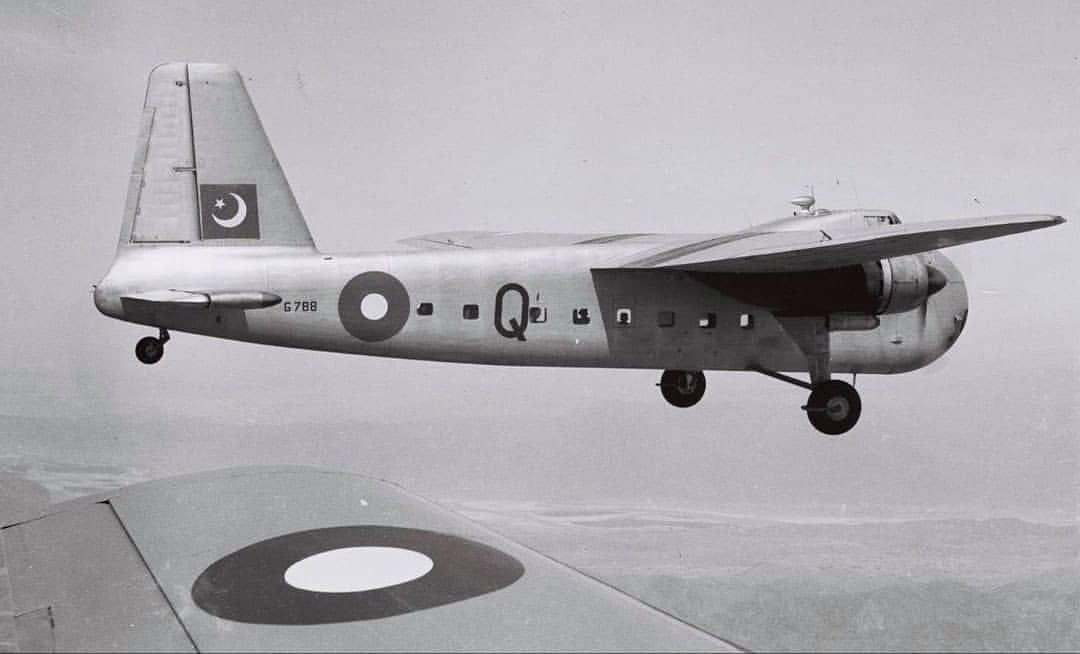
A Bristol Freighter of the Pakistan Air Force

Argentina

- Argentine Air Force

Australia

- Royal Australian Air Force – Four in service from 1949 to 1967. They were used for transport duties in support of the Weapons Research Establishment, Woomera, South Australia.
  - No. 34 Squadron RAAF
  - No. 1 Air Trials Unit
  - No. 2 Air Trials Unit
  - Aircraft Research and Development Unit

Burma

- Burmese Air Force

Canada

- Royal Canadian Air Force

Iraq

- Iraqi Air Force

New Zealand

- Royal New Zealand Air Force
  - No. 1 Squadron RNZAF
  - No. 3 Squadron RNZAF
  - No. 41 Squadron RNZAF
  - Transport Support Unit RNZAF

Pakistan

- Royal Pakistan Air Force
  - No. 6 Squadron "Antelopes"

United Kingdom

- A&AEE Boscombe Down
- Telecommunications Research Establishment (TRE)

== Accidents and incidents ==
Sixty-eight of the 214 Freighters built were destroyed or damaged beyond economical repair in accidents. At least 45 of these were fatal, resulting in the deaths of at least 385 passengers and crew.

== Surviving aircraft ==
Of 214 aircraft produced, there are 11 complete airframes of varying quality that survive in the 21st century.

=== Argentina ===
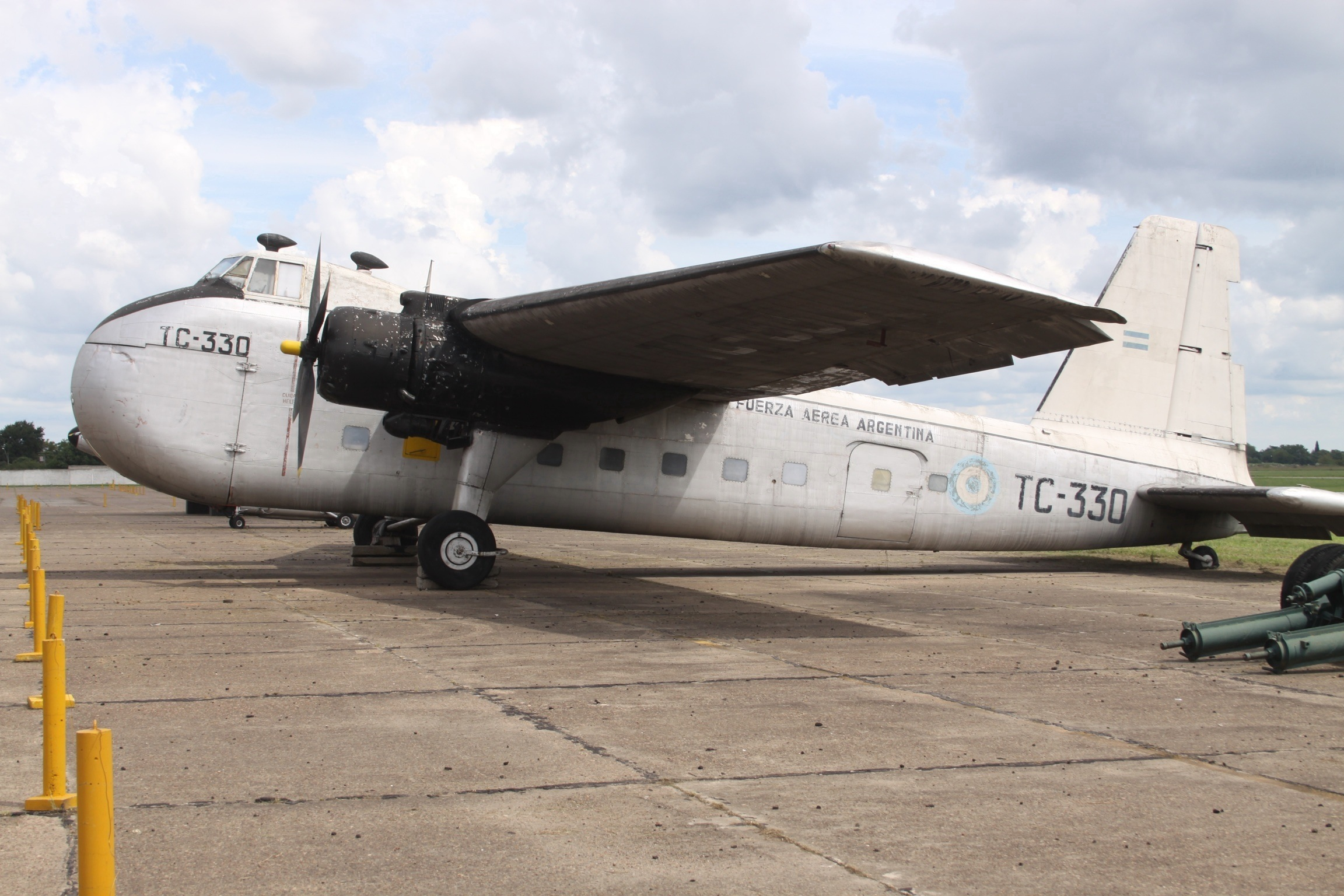
TC-330 at the Museo Nacional de Aeronáutica de Argentina

On display

- Mk 1A TC-330 of the Argentine Air Force at Museo Nacional de Aeronáutica de Argentina, Morón, Buenos Aires.

=== Australia ===
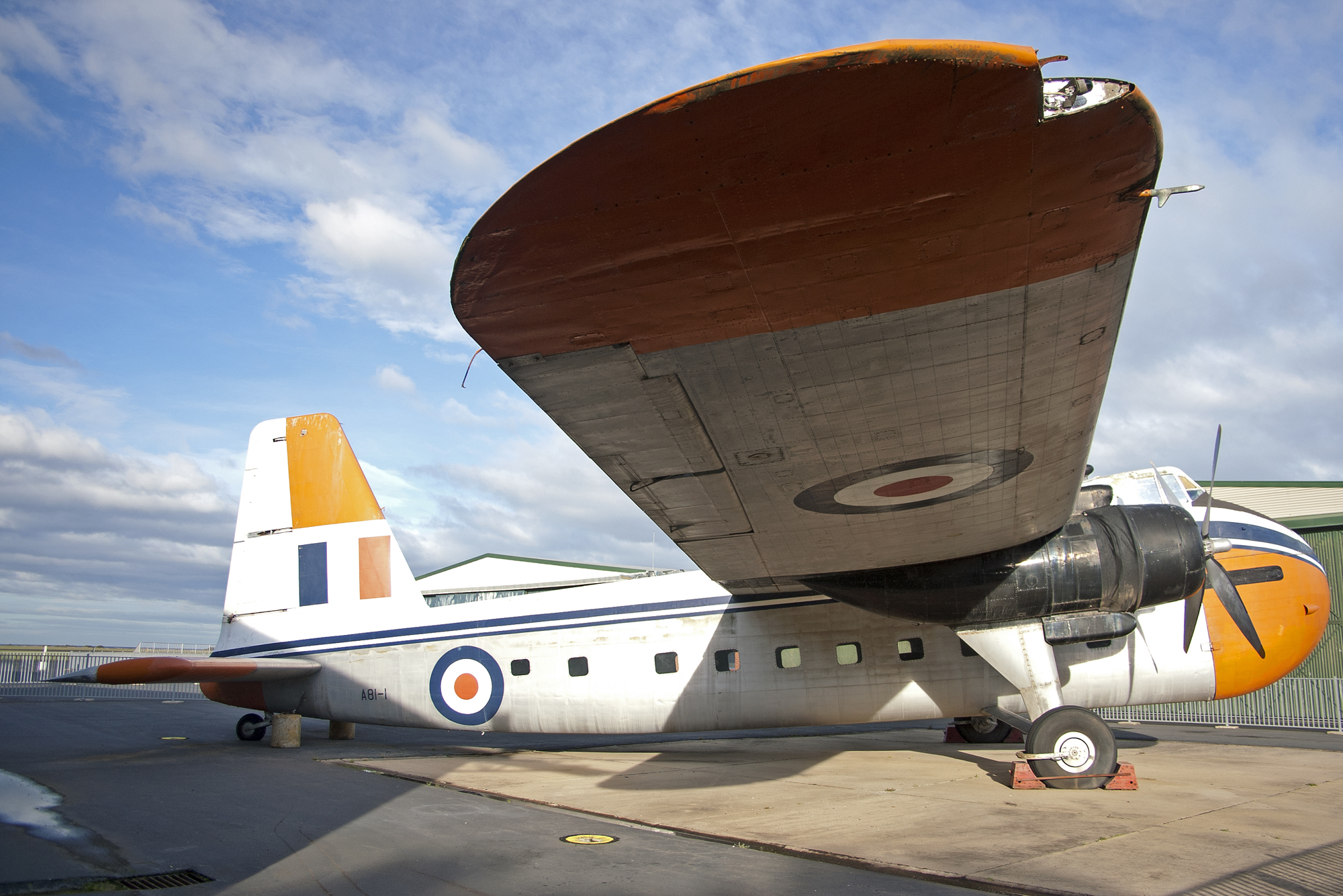
A81-1 at the RAAF Museum

On display

- Mk 21 A81-1 at Royal Australian Air Force Museum, Point Cook, Victoria.
- Mk 31M VH-ADL at the Australian National Aviation Museum, Moorabbin Airport, Melbourne.

=== Canada ===
On display

- Mk 31M CF-WAE, former Royal Canadian Air Force and Norcanair aircraft at Royal Aviation Museum of Western Canada, Manitoba.
- Mk 31 C-GYQS, former Royal New Zealand Air Force (NZ5907) and civil aircraft, at the Reynolds-Alberta Museum, Wetaskiwin Airport, Alberta, in its final Hawkair markings.
- Mk 31 CF-TFX, on display (in Wardair colours) at Yellowknife Airport, Yellowknife, (NT).

Derelict

- Stripped hulk of Mk 31M CF-TFZ on the shore of Beaverlodge Lake, Saskatchewan, where it crashed in 1956.

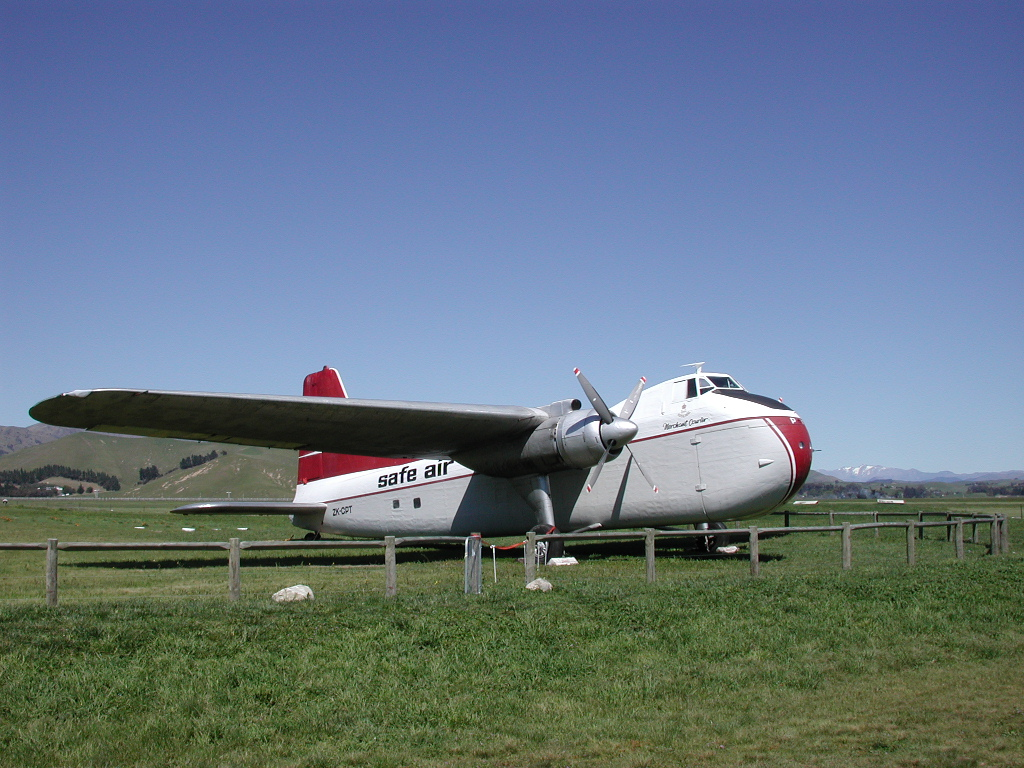
Safe Air Freighter 31 preserved at Omaka, NZ

=== New Zealand ===
On display

- Mk 31M NZ5903, at the Royal New Zealand Air Force Museum.
- Mk 31M NZ5906, outdoor display and used as two-bedroom motel accommodation, Woodlyn Park, near Waitomo Caves.
- Mk 31M ZK-CLU, outdoor display at Founders Heritage Park, Nelson.
- Mk 31E ZK-CPT, in SAFE Air colours, at the Omaka Aerodrome, Blenheim. The aircraft has been restored and can taxi, but does not fly.

Fuselage only

- The Ferrymead Aeronautical Society holds the forward fuselage section of the ex-SAFE Air ZK-CRK and the cockpit deck of ZK-AYG
- Fuselage of Mk 31M NZ5902/ZK-EPA sits derelict on private property at Awhitu, near Auckland and is for sale in July 2021.

=== United Kingdom ===
In storage

- Mk 31M NZ5911, currently being restored by Aerospace Bristol. Shipped from New Zealand.

== Specifications (Freighter Mk.31) ==
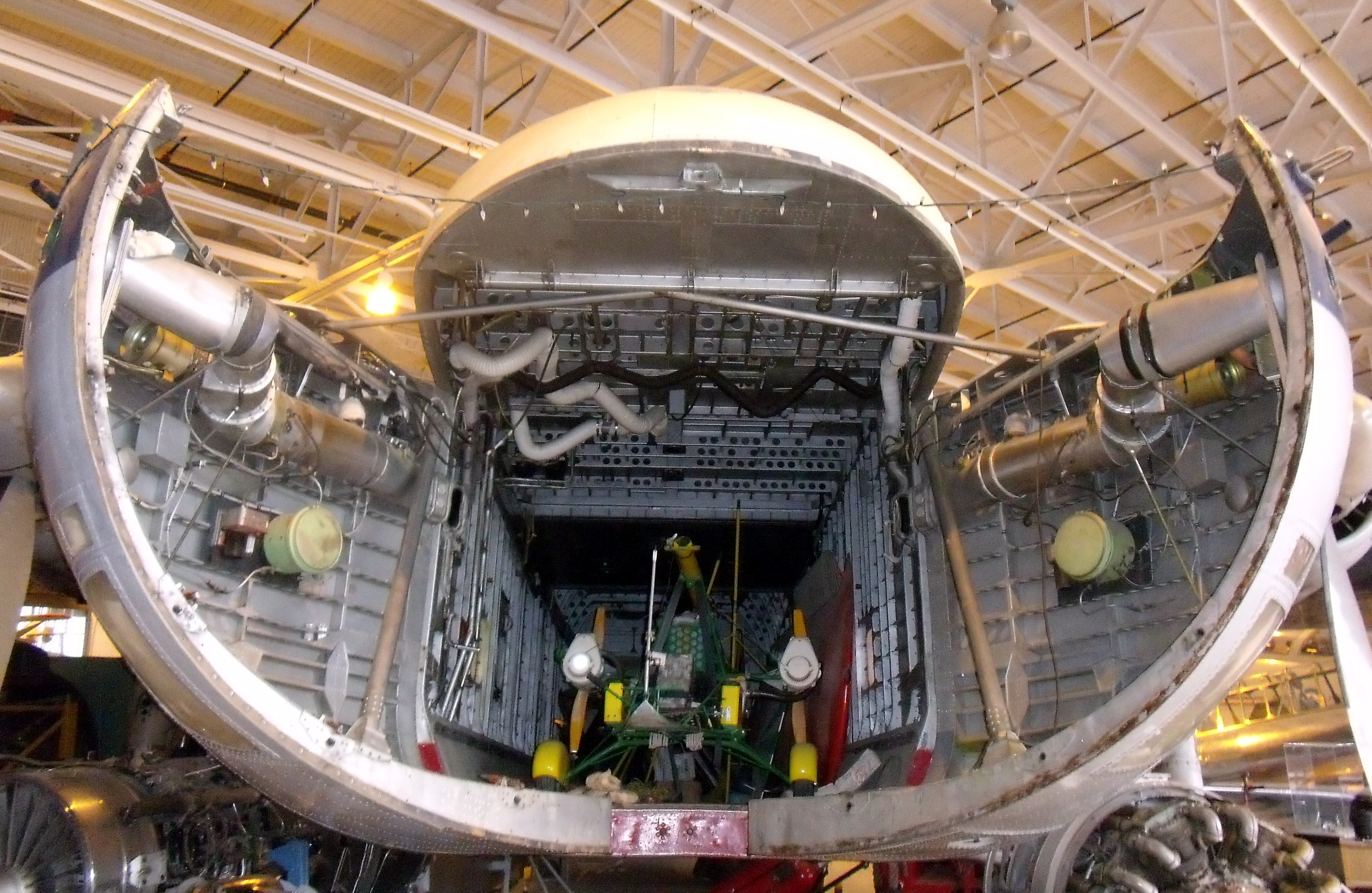
Cargo hold of a Freighter

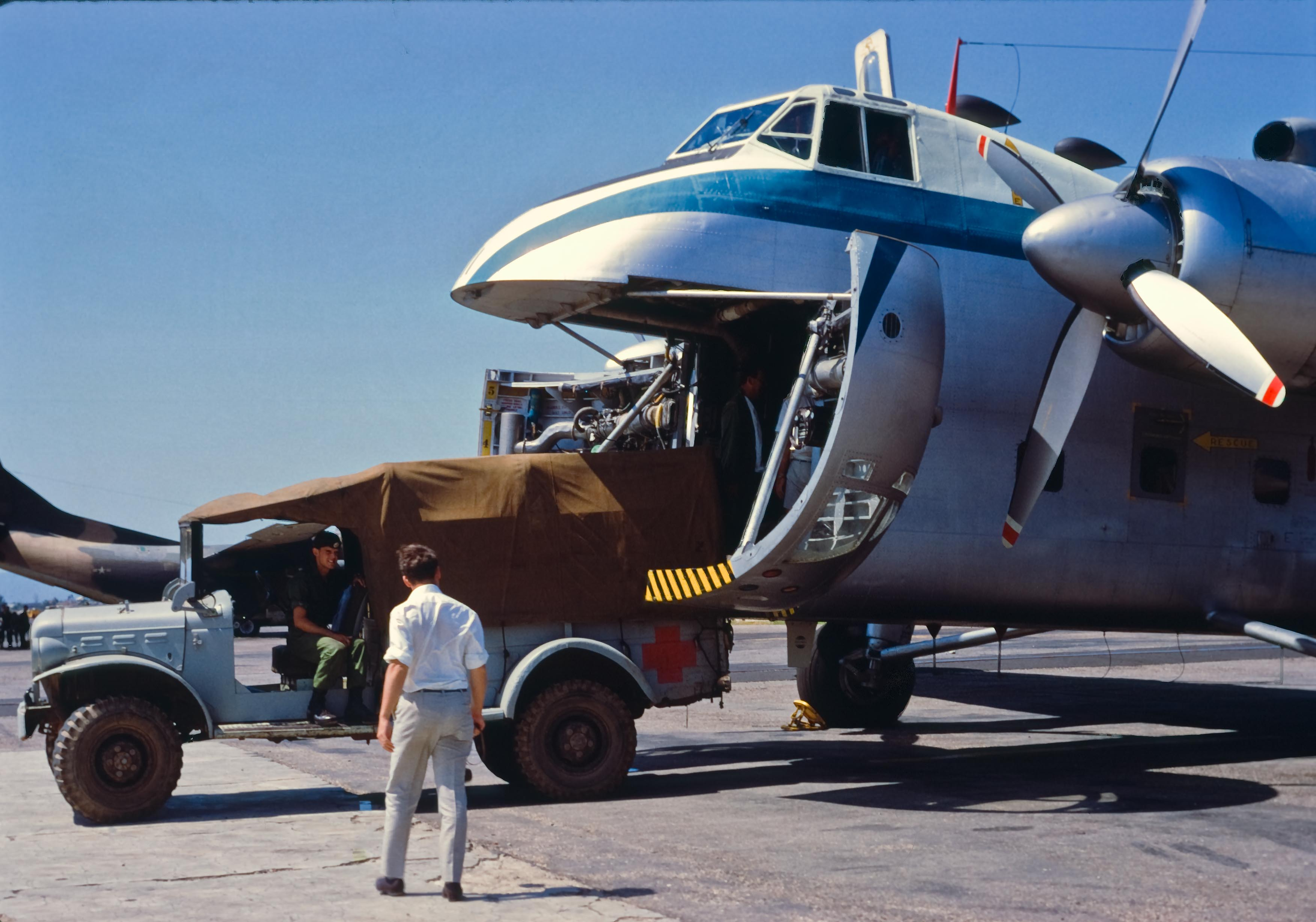
NZ Services Medical Team collecting supplies from an RNZAF Bristol Freighter at Qui Nhon, South Vietnam, 1969

Data from Jane's all the World's Aircraft 1953–54

General characteristics

- Crew: 3
- Capacity: 22,300 cu ft (630 m^{3}) cargo hold, 16,184 lb (7,341 kg) payload inc fuel
- Length: 68 ft 4 in (20.83 m)
- Wingspan: 108 ft 0 in (32.92 m)
- Height: 21 ft 8 in (6.60 m)
- Wing area: 1,487 sq ft (138.1 m^{2})
- Airfoil: RAF 28 (modified)
- Empty weight: 26,910 lb (12,206 kg)
- Gross weight: 44,000 lb (19,958 kg) all marks
- Fuel capacity: 1,170 imp gal (1,410 US gal; 5,300 L) total
- Powerplant: 2 × Bristol Hercules 734 14-cylinder air-cooled radial piston engines, 2,000 hp (1,500 kW) each
- Propellers: 4-bladed de Havilland constant-speed fully-feathering metal propellers, 14 ft (4.3 m) diameter

Performance

- Maximum speed: 225 mph (362 km/h, 196 kn) at 3,000 ft (910 m)
- Cruise speed: 164 mph (264 km/h, 143 kn) recommended, at 5,000 ft (1,500 m)
- Range: 820 mi (1,320 km, 710 nmi) with 12,000 lb (5,400 kg) payload
- Service ceiling: 23,000 ft (7,000 m) at max. continuous power and 38,000 lb (17,000 kg)
- Rate of climb: 250 ft/min (1.3 m/s) on one engine at fully loaded weight
- Time to altitude: 10,000 ft (3,000 m) in 10 minutes at max. continuous power
- Power/mass: 11 lb/hp (6.7 kg/kW)
- Take-off distance to 50 ft (15 m): 2,500 ft (760 m) in a 5 mph (4.3 kn; 8.0 km/h) wind
- Landing distance from 50 ft (15 m): 2,300 ft (700 m) in a 5 mph (4.3 kn; 8.0 km/h) wind

== See also ==
External videos
- Video of the First Taxi Run of Bristol Freighter in 20 Years
- Extended footage of a Bristol Freighter in a film
- Documentary of Freighter operations in New Zealand

Aircraft of comparable role, configuration, and era

- Armstrong Whitworth AW.660 Argosy
- Aviation Traders Carvair
- Blackburn Beverley
