= Trans European Aviation =

Closed British charter airline

Trans European Aviation Ltd. was a British charter airline which operated from 1959 until closure in 1962. With the introduction of the larger Lockheed Constellation in its services, the airline trading name was changed in 1961 to Trans European Airways.

== History ==
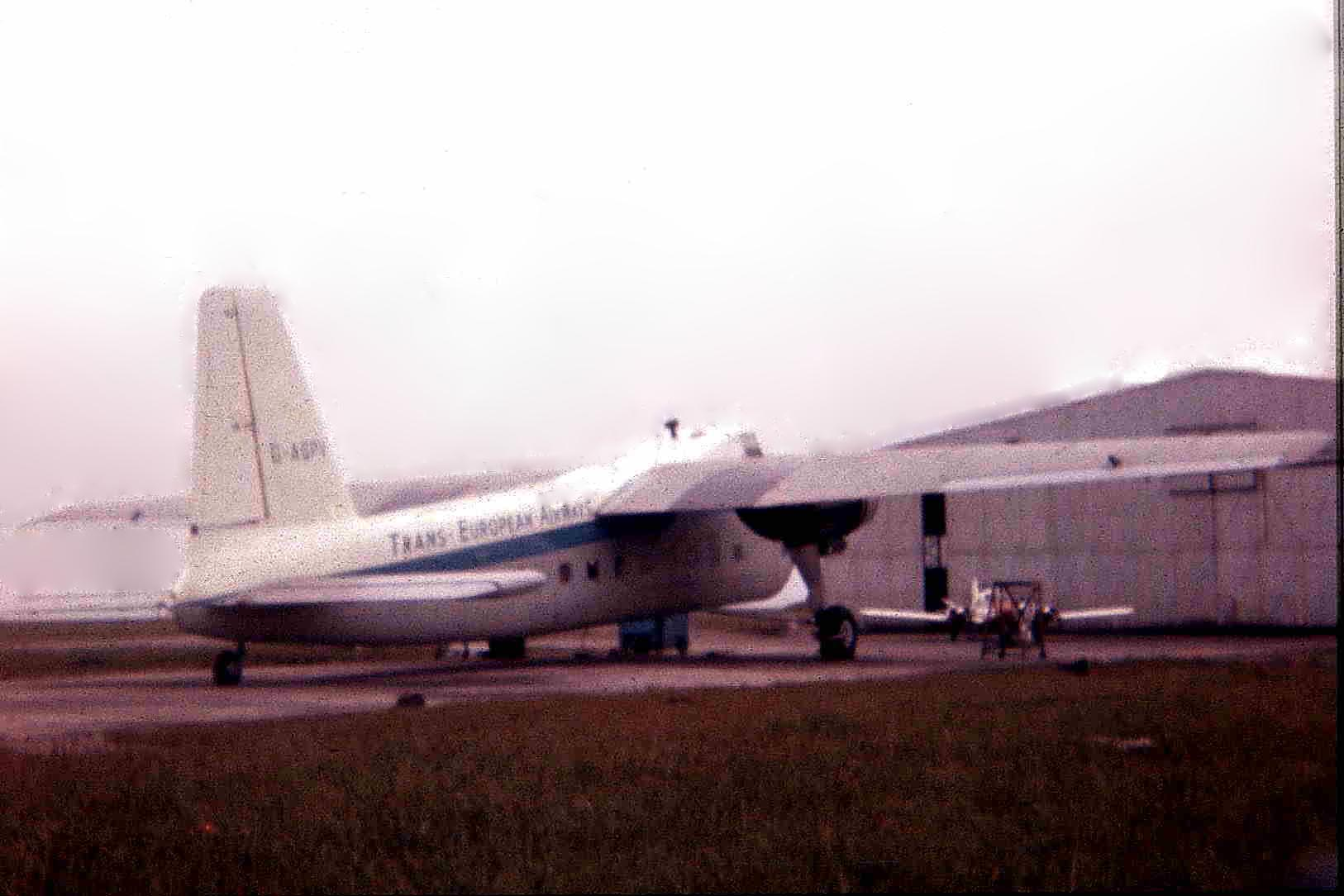
Bristol 170, 1962

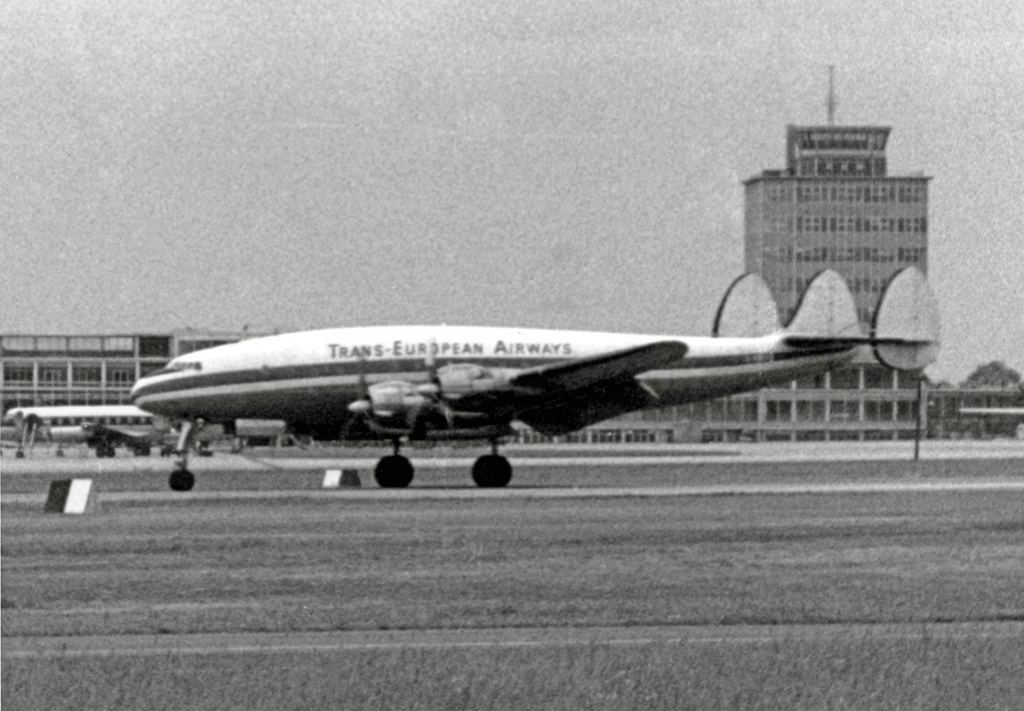
Lockheed L-049 Constellation operating a charter flight at Manchester Airport, 1962

The airline was formed in early 1959 to operate charter flights from Swansea Airport with two de Havilland Dragon Rapide DH.89A aircraft. Flight operations started in the month of May. In early 1960 the operational base was transferred to Coventry Airport and a Bristol Freighter, previously owned by Air Condor, was acquired in October that year. This larger aircraft was used to operate both freight and passenger charter flights.

In early 1961 the airline decided to enter the inclusive-tour market when it tried to acquire a Lockheed Constellation from Cubana. The deal fell through but in May 1961 the air carrier took delivery of the first of three Constellations, which were based at London Gatwick Airport. The airline operated charters and inclusive tour flights from London and other major United Kingdom airports to Mediterranean resorts. It also operated inclusive tour flights from West Berlin. From July 1961, operations with the Constellations were conducted under the duly registered trading name Trans European Airways Ltd.

In mid-July, 1962 a Constellation was damaged on the ground at Tel Aviv, while allegedly undergoing maintenance with Israel Aircraft Industries. The aircraft became stranded in Israel after the government authorities impounded the aircraft, claiming non-payment of fees to the local maintenance contractor. Against these odds the airline went on with just a single aircraft until July 27, 1962, when it succumbed to mounting financial problems and called in receivers. Even then, the airline maintained operations for another month until the Bristol B-170 and the sole Constellation were impounded at Gatwick against outstanding landing fees. Although attempts were made to revive Trans European, these failed.

== See also ==
- List of defunct airlines of the United Kingdom
