= Prime Aviation =

Airline of Kazakhstan

IATA	ICAO	Call sign
—	PKZ	PRAVI
- Commenced operations: 2005; 21 years ago
- Hubs: Almaty Airport
- Secondary hubs: Astana Airport, Atyrau Airport
- Fleet size: 1
- Headquarters: Almaty, Kazakhstan
- Website: https://primeaviation.kz

Prime Aviation JSC is a private airline established in 2005 and based in Almaty, Kazakhstan operating charter and business flights from its bases of Almaty Airport, Atyrau Airport and Astana Airport.

== Fleet ==
=== Current fleet ===
As of July 2026, Prime Aviation operates the following aircraft:

Prime Aviation Fleet
Aircraft	In Service	Orders	Passengers	Notes
Bombardier Dash 8-Q300	1	—		
Total	1			

=== Former fleet ===
As of August 2025, Prime Aviation operated 2 De Havilland Canada DHC-8-Q300.

Prime Aviation also previously operated the following aircraft(as of August 2019):

- 1 Airbus A320-200 (CJ)
- 1 Boeing 737-700 (BBJ)

The Prime Aviation fleet previously included the following aircraft (as of November 2012):

Prime Aviation Fleet in 2012
Aircraft	In Fleet	Orders	Passengers	Notes
Bombardier Q200	1	0	37	P4-TCO, ex Horizon Air
Bombardier Challenger 605	1	0	TBA	A7-RZA
Bombardier Challenger 604	1	0	TBA	P4-CHN
Gulfstream G200	1	0	10	P4-ADD
Hawker 900XP	1	0	11	P4-ALA
Mil Mi-172	1	0	8	UP-MI709
