= Trans Nation Airways =

Charter airline of Ethiopia

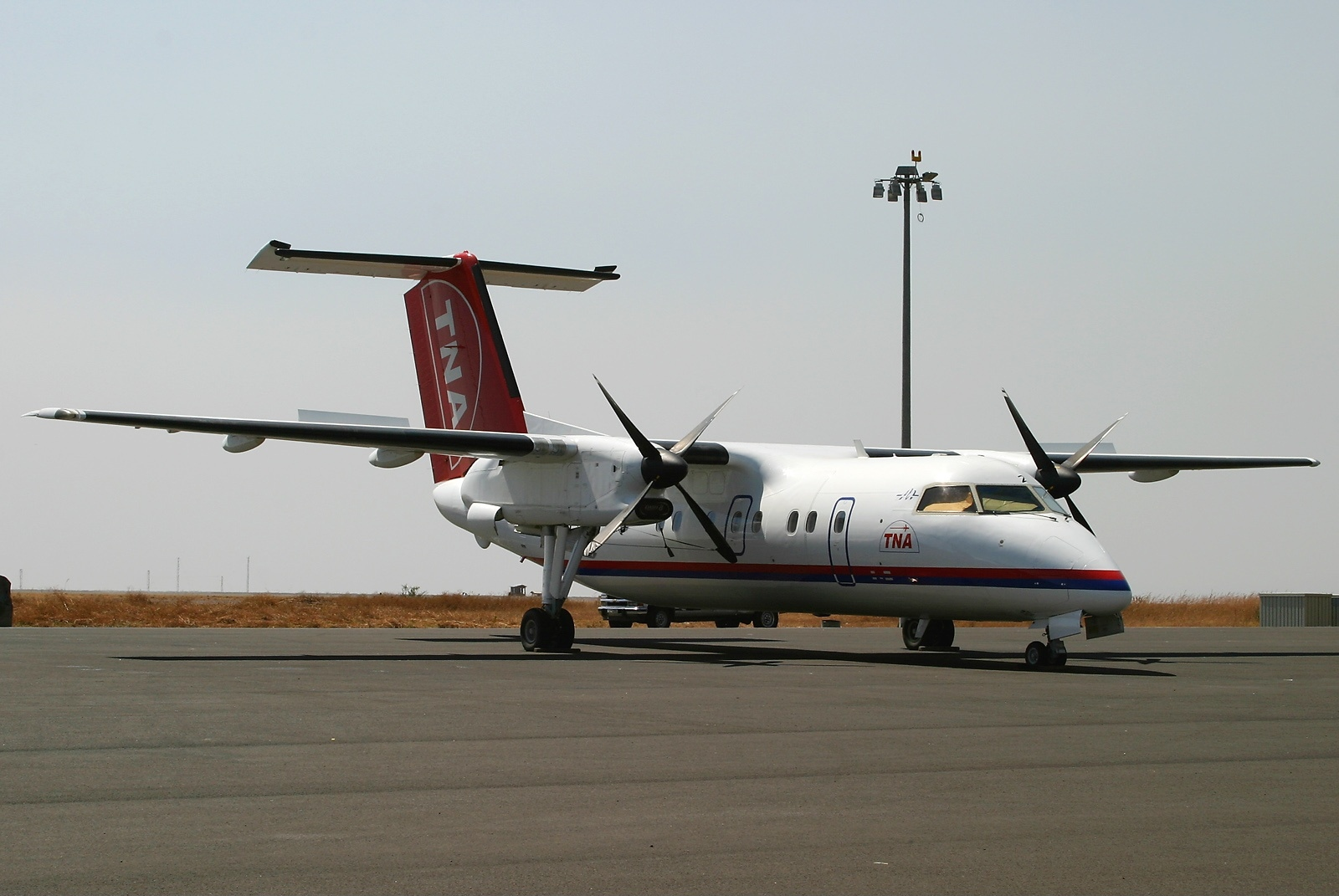
IATA	ICAO	Call sign
-	TNW	TRANS-NATION
- Founded: 2004; 22 years ago
- Hubs: Addis Ababa Bole International Airport
- Fleet size: 1
- Destinations: Charter
- Parent company: MIDROC Ethiopia
- Headquarters: Addis Ababa, Ethiopia
- Website: midroc-ceo.com/TNA

Trans Nation Airways (officially Trans Nation Airways Pvt. Ltd. Co.) is a charter airline based in Addis Ababa, Ethiopia. Established in 2004, it is a subsidiary of the MIDROC Ethiopia Technology Group, owned by Sheikh Mohammed Hussein Al Amoudi.

Unlike scheduled carriers, TNA primarily provides domestic contract charters for tourists and logistics support for MIDROC's industrial projects, particularly in the mining and agricultural sectors.

== Fleet ==
=== Current fleet ===
As of July 2026, Trans Nation Airways operates the following aircraft:

Trans Nation Airways fleet
Aircraft	In Service	Orders	Passengers	Notes
Bombardier Dash 8-Q200	1	—	37	Used for mining support logistics
Total	1			

=== Former fleet ===
As of August 2025, Trans Nation Airways operated 1 Bombardier Dash 8-Q200

The airline previously operated a second Bombardier Dash 8-Q200, which has since been withdrawn.
