= Hawkair =

Canadian regional airline

| IATA | ICAO | Call sign |
|---|---|---|
| BH | BHA | HAWKAIR |
- Founded: 1994
- Ceased operations: 2016
- Hubs: Northwest Regional Airport; Vancouver International Airport
- Focus cities: Prince Rupert
- Destinations: 5
- Headquarters: Terrace, British Columbia

Hawkair (Hawkair Aviation Services) was a regional airline based in Terrace, British Columbia, Canada. It operated scheduled and charter regional passenger services in British Columbia and Alberta. Its main base was Northwest Regional Airport with a hub at Vancouver International Airport.

== History ==
Hawkair Aviation Services was established and started operations in 1994 as an air freight service operating out of Terrace. In 2000 it started air passenger services, initially between Vancouver and Terrace. It quickly expanded to serve most of the airports of northern British Columbia.

The first plane it owned was a Bristol Freighter. In 2004, this plane took its last flight to an air museum in Wetaskiwin, Alberta. This was the last flight flown by a Bristol Freighter.

In October 2005, it was forced to file for protection under the Companies' Creditors Arrangement Act (bankruptcy protection), and reduced the number of aircraft in its fleet from 5 to 3.

In April 2007, Hawkair announced that it would be resuming service to Smithers on May 21, 2007. The service operated daily to/from Vancouver. On August 1, 2015, service to Smithers was suspended again due to low passenger loads.

In March 2010, Hawkair was purchased by 580741 BC, the parent company of Central Mountain Air and Northern Thunderbird Air.

In November 2015, Hawkair announced it was cancelling scheduled service into Prince Rupert

In December 2015, Hawkair entered a Capacity Purchase Agreement with sister airline Central Mountain Air, effectively ending its status as a scheduled airline.

In September 2016, Central Mountain Air cancelled the remaining Terrace to Vancouver direct scheduled service using Hawkair Aircraft, ending a 16 year long connection.

On November 18, 2016, Hawkair declared bankruptcy, had all assets seized for liquidation, and permanently suspended operations.

== Destinations ==
Before permanently ceasing operations, Hawkair operated scheduled services to the following destinations in British Columbia from Concourse B of the Main Domestic Terminal of Vancouver International Airport:

- Dawson Creek (Dawson Creek Airport)
- Terrace (Northwest Regional Airport)
- Vancouver (Vancouver International Airport)

In the past the following destinations were also served:

- Bob Quinn Lake (Bob Quinn Lake Airport), BC
- Fort Nelson (Fort Nelson Airport), B.C.
- Fort St. John (Fort St. John Airport), B.C.
- Prince George (Prince George Airport), B.C.
- Prince Rupert (Prince Rupert Airport)
- Sandspit (Sandspit Airport), B.C.
- Smithers (Smithers Airport)
- Victoria (Victoria International Airport), B.C.
- Calgary (Calgary International Airport), AB (from Fort St. John)
- Grande Prairie (Grande Prairie Airport), AB

== Fleet ==
The Hawkair fleet previously included:

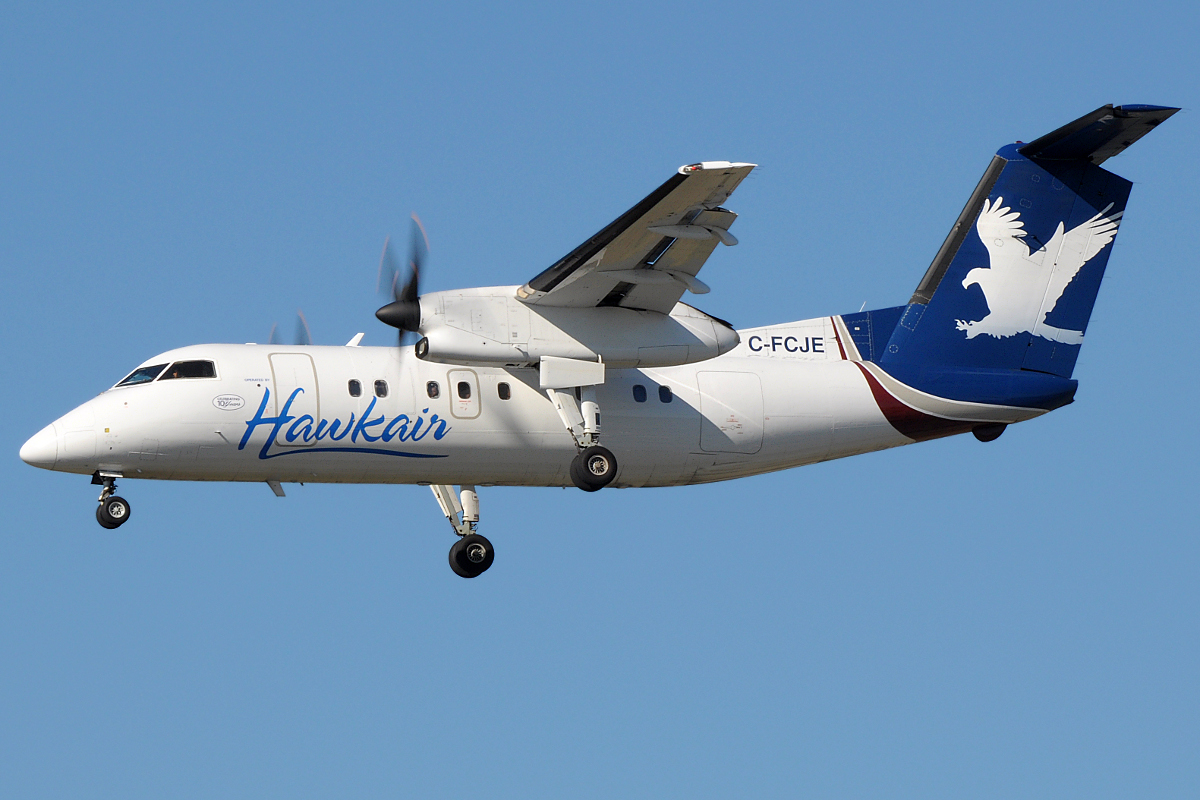
Hawkair Dash 8-100

- 2 Bristol Freighter
- 1 Cessna 150
- 2 Bombardier Dash 8-100
- 8 Bombardier Dash 8-102
- 2 Bombardier Dash 8-311
- 1 Douglas ATL.98 CARVAIR (Aviation Traders Carvair)
- 1 Piper PA-28 Cherokee

According to Flight International they also operated the following:

- 1 King Air 200
- 1 Fairchild Metro II
- 1 Fairchild Merlin IV

== See also ==
- List of defunct airlines of Canada
