= United Airways (disambiguation) =

United Airways is an airline of Bangladesh. Other airlines of similar name are:

- United Airways Limited, a British airline that operated in 1935
- British United Airways, an airline operating from 1960 to 1970
- British United Island Airways

== See also ==
- United Airlines (disambiguation)
