= British United Island Airways =

Regional airline of the United Kingdom (1968–1970)

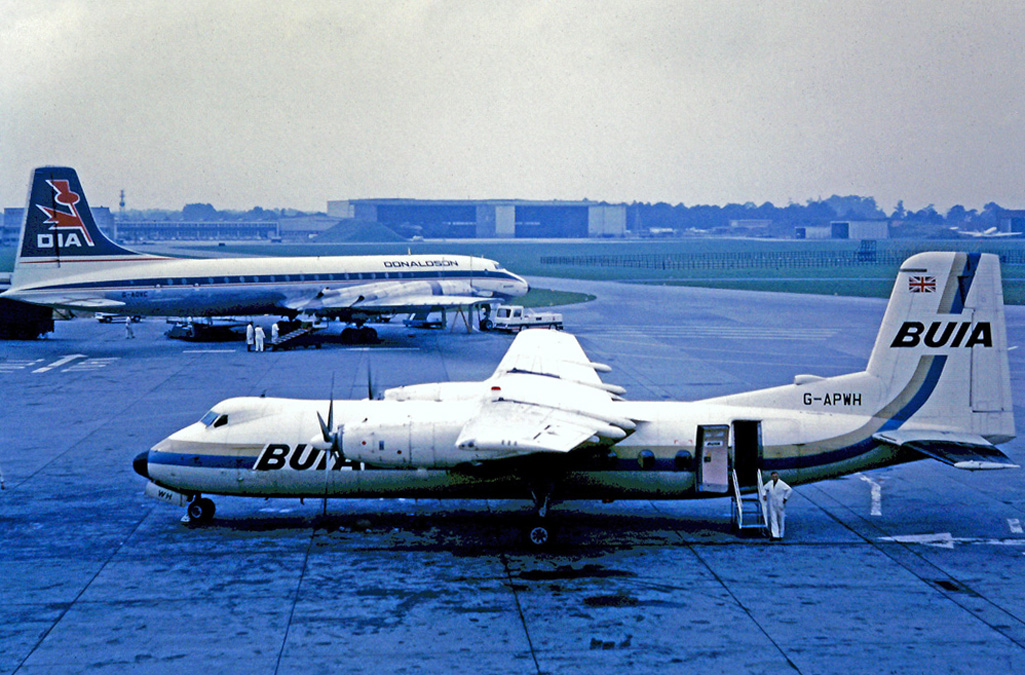
- Dart Herald 200
| IATA | ICAO | Call sign |
|---|---|---|
| UK | — | BRITISLAND |
- Commenced operations: 1 November 1968
- Ceased operations: 20 July 1970 (rebranded as British Island Airways)
- Hubs: Blackpool; London–Gatwick; Southampton
- Focus cities: Guernsey; Isle of Man; Jersey
- Fleet size: 11 aircraft (7 Dart Herald 200, 4 Douglas DC-3 freighters (as of March 1970)))
- Destinations: Europe
- Parent company: BUA (Holdings)
- Headquarters: London Gatwick Airport
- Key people: Hon. A. Cayzer; Alan Bristow; Wg Cdr L.B. "Bill" Elwin

British United Island Airways Ltd. (BUIA) was formed in November 1968 as part of a reorganisation of the BUA group of companies. It was a regional sister airline of British United Airways (BUA), Britain's largest wholly private, independent (Note: independent from government-owned corporations) airline of the 1960s. It operated a network of regional, short-haul scheduled routes linking a variety of destinations within Europe, including year-round services from both Channel Islands to BUA's Gatwick base.

BUIA's origins could be traced to the BUA group's acquisition of Jersey Airlines and Silver City Airways in 1962. BUA's management amalgamated the Channel Islands scheduled passenger and freight services of these airlines (named the Duchess Services by Jersey Airlines) and Silver City's northern division to create a single airline, BUA (C.I.).

BUIA's creation followed the BUA group's 1968 reorganisation. It involved merging the operations of Channels Islands-based BUA (C.I.) Airways, Isle of Man based British United (Manx) Airways and Morton Air Services.

When British & Commonwealth (B&C), the BUA group's majority shareholder, decided to sell BUA to Caledonian Airways in November 1970, BUIA was not part of this deal. Prior to BUA's sale to Caledonian, BUIA had already changed its name to British Island Airways (BIA) in July 1970.

== History ==
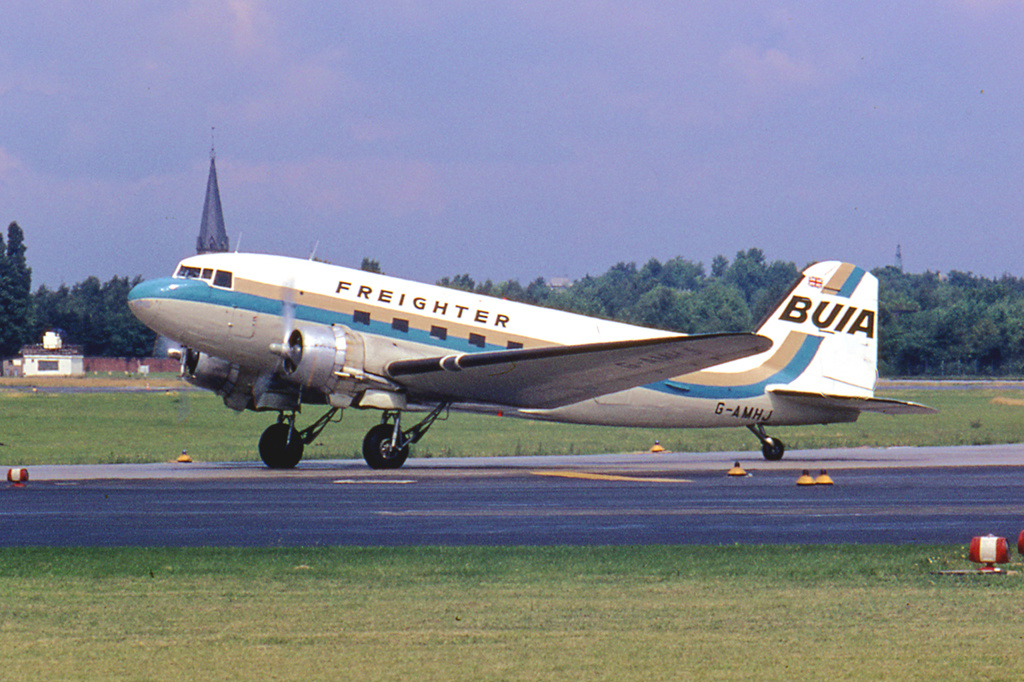
A C-47 freighter at Berlin Tempelhof in July 1969

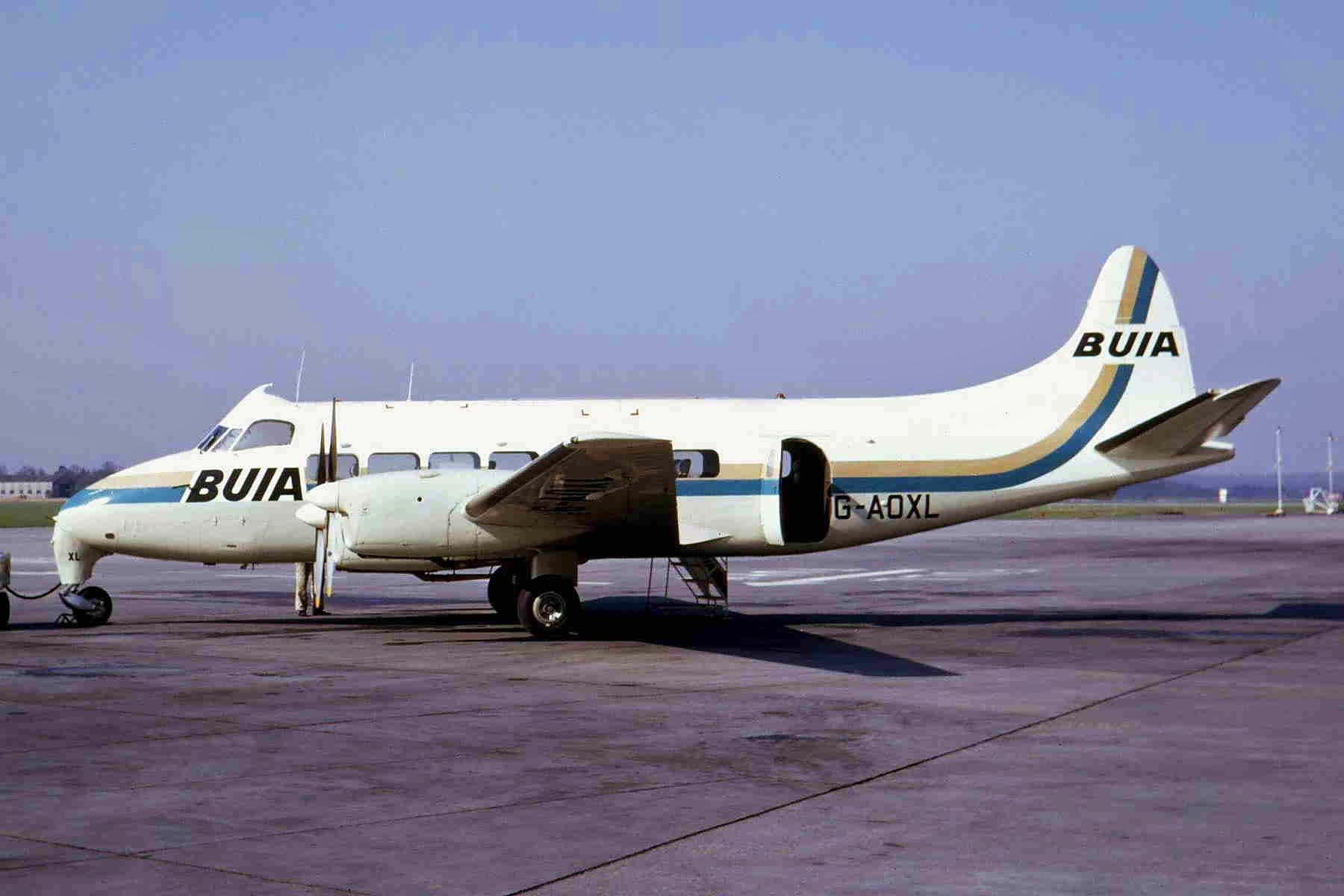
DH.114 Heron 1 at London Gatwick Airport in 1969

BUIA commenced operations on 1 November 1968 as a wholly owned subsidiary of BUA (Holdings) Ltd, taking over BUA's regional domestic and international routes, the majority of which served the Channel Islands and the Isle of Man on a seasonal basis.

BUIA's main operating bases were at Gatwick, Southampton, Blackpool (Squires Gate), Exeter, Jersey and the Isle of Man. Services from Gatwick and Southampton to the Channel islands and from Blackpool to the Isle of Man and Belfast operated year-round. All other services were seasonal summer only services. Dublin and Paris Orly were among the international destinations served.

BUIA competed with British European Airways (BEA) on scheduled routes linking London with the two main Channel Islands of Jersey and Guernsey. While BUIA's flights used Gatwick as their London terminal, BEA served these routes from Heathrow.

In addition to scheduled and non-scheduled passenger services, BUIA also operated all-cargo services — both scheduled and non-scheduled. Düsseldorf was one of the international scheduled freight destinations.

BUIA gradually retired older piston airliners and mainline turboprops it inherited from BUA at the time of its creation. By 1968, BUIA operated its last DC-3 passenger flight. Eventually, all passenger flights were operated with Handley Page Dart Herald turboprops, while a small number of DC-3s was retained for freight services and as backup aircraft.

B&C's disenchantment with BUA's financial performance resulted in the sale of BUA to the Scottish charter airline Caledonian Airways on 30 November 1970. This sale specifically excluded BUIA. It therefore became a wholly owned subsidiary of B&C, which had taken direct control following its divestment of BUA. on 20 July 1970 BUIA changed its name to British Island Airways (BIA) and adopted a new livery.

== Fleet ==
At the time of its inception, BUIA operated the following aircraft types:

- de Havilland DH 114 Heron
- Douglas DC-3/C-47
- Handley Page HPR 7 Dart Herald
- Vickers Viscount

=== Fleet in 1969 ===
In April 1969 BUIA's fleet comprised 14 aircraft (7 turboprops + 7 piston airliners).

| Aircraft | Number |
|---|---|
| Handley Page HPR 7 Dart Herald 200 | 7 |
| Douglas DC-3 Dakota | 4 |
| de Havilland DH 114 Heron | 3 |
| Total | 14 |

BUIA employed 600 people at this time.

== Accidents and incidents ==
There are no recorded accidents or incidents involving BUIA aircraft.

== See also ==
- List of defunct airlines of the United Kingdom

== Notes ==
Notes

Citations
