= Gordon Olley =

British flying ace

Gordon Percy Olley
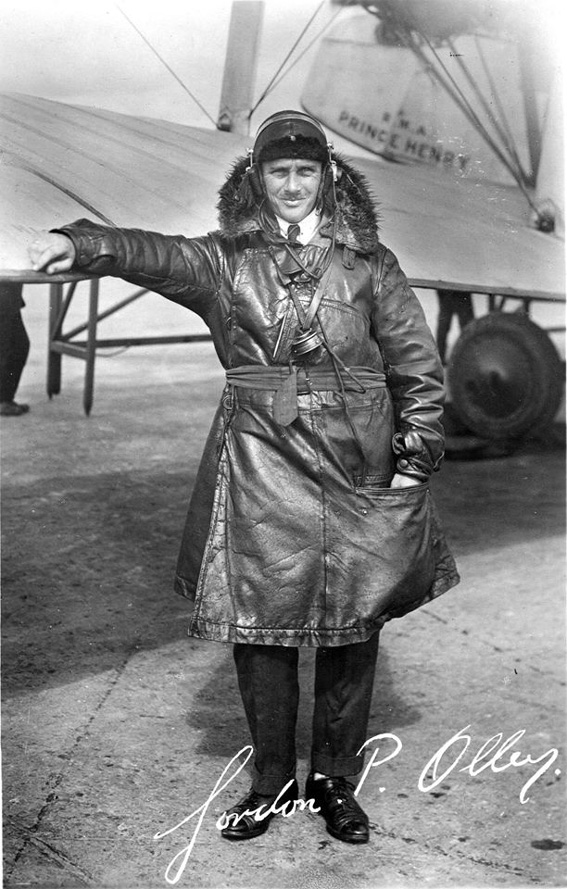
- A photo of Flying Officer, Gordon Percy Olley.
- Born: 29 April 1893; Harleston, Norfolk, England
- Died: 18 March 1958 (aged 64); Wimbledon, London, England
- Occupations: Aviation and Company Director
- Known for: First World War flying ace
- Awards: Military Medal

Flying Officer Gordon Percy Olley MM (29 April 1893 – 18 March 1958) was a World War I flying ace who later formed his own airline, Olley Air Services. He was the first pilot to fly one million miles in total.

== Early years ==
Olley was born in Harleston, Norfolk on 29 April 1893. In the 1901 Census Olley, aged 7, is described as living at 161, Gloucester Road, Bristol with his parents George and Eliza Olley and a brother and sister. His father is described as a Tobacconist and Hairdresser. In the 1911 Census Olley is still living at the same address, now aged 17, and described as an Apprentice in a wholesale clothing warehouse. In 1912 he became a "motor salesman" at London's Selfridges department store.

== Military aviator ==
Olley joined the Queen Victoria's Rifles in August 1914. He later transferred to the Royal Fusiliers, rising to the rank of serjeant, before being posted to the Royal Flying Corps as an Air Mechanic Second Class, going to France with them on 17 June 1915. At first he was a despatch rider, and then he became an air observer with No. 1 Squadron.

After training as a pilot he rejoined the squadron in 1917 to fly Nieuport scouts. In September 1917 he was awarded the Military Medal for bravery in the field. He was then commissioned as a temporary second lieutenant on the General List, and appointed a flying officer in the Royal Flying Corps on 28 January 1918. He transferred to the Royal Air Force on its formation on 1 April 1918 and was promoted to lieutenant.

After the war he was transferred to Unemployed List on 22 June 1919.

His service record states that in addition to his MM he was mentioned in dispatches "for valuable services" during the war. During operations with 1 Squadron he is credited with ten aerial victories, comprising 3 destroyed, 5 ( and 2 shared) 'out of control'.

He rejoined the RAF in 1923 when he was commissioned as a flying officer on probation in Class A of the Reserve of Air Force Officers on 4 December, he was confirmed in that rank on 4 June 1924. He transferred to Class C of the reserve on 4 December 1932, and relinquished the commission on 4 December 1936, and was permitted to retain his rank.

== Civil aviator ==
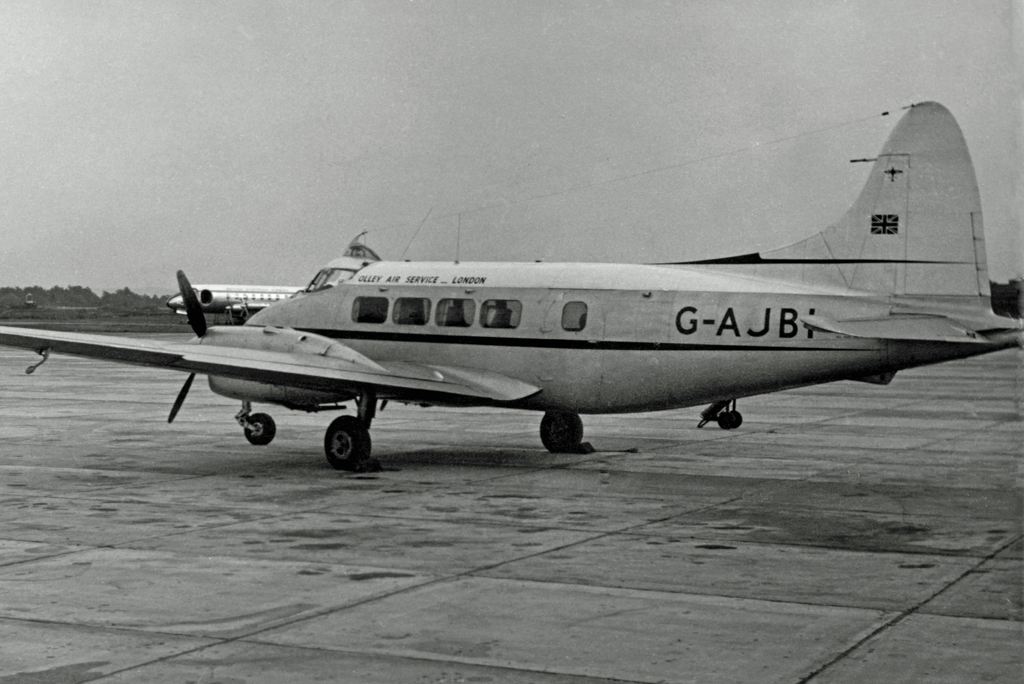
Olley Air Services De Havilland Dove in 1954

After leaving the Royal Air Force he worked as a pilot for Handley Page Air Transport, Imperial Airways and KLM. In 1931, he became the world's first pilot to log one million miles. Leaving Imperial, he started his own airline, Olley Air Services, in 1934. The firm originally operated from its base at Croydon Airport as a charter airline. Olley Air Services eventually was part of a group of airlines that included Blackpool & West Coast Air Services, Channel Air Ferries and Isle of Man Air Services. After the Second World War the airline resumed services from Croydon as both a charter airline and a scheduled service before being sold to Morton Air Services in 1953.

Olley died in Wimbledon on 18 March 1958. His obituary reported that not one of his 40,000 passengers suffered a casualty.
