= SS Hatarana =

UK-owned cargo steamship that was sunk in the Battle of the Atlantic

History

United Kingdom
- Name: 1917: War Sailor; 1919: Hatarana
- Owner: 1917: Furness, Withy & Co; 1919: British India SN Co
- Port of registry: London
- Builder: Kawasaki Dockyard, Kobe
- Completed: August 1917
- Identification: UK official number 140430; until 1933: code letters JRVK; from 1930: call sign GRZW
- Fate: Sunk by torpedo, 1942

General characteristics
- Class & type: T-type cargo ship
- Tonnage: 7,522 GRT, 4,592 NRT, 10,400 DWT
- Length: 445.0 ft (135.6 m)
- Beam: 58.3 ft (17.8 m)
- Draught: 26 ft 5 in (8.05 m)
- Depth: 31.3 ft (9.5 m)
- Decks: 2
- Installed power: 659 NHP
- Propulsion: 2 × triple-expansion engines; 2 × screws
- Speed: 12 knots (22 km/h)
- Crew: 98 crew plus 10 DEMS gunners
- Armament: DEMS in wartime
- Notes: sister ship: War Soldier

SS Hatarana was a cargo steamship that was built as part of an emergency shipbuilding programme during the First World War, and sunk without loss of life in the Battle of the Atlantic during the Second World War. She was built as War Sailor, one of a batch of cargo ships that the United Kingdom ordered from Japanese shipyards. She was renamed Hatarana in 1919 when she changed owners.

== War Sailor ==
Japan had been a military ally of the UK since 1902, and joined the First World War on the Allied side in August 1914. In 1917 British shipping companies, on behalf of the UK Shipping Controller, ordered 20 cargo ships from Japanese shipyards, built to standard designs. The largest batch was 12 ships that Furness, Withy & Co ordered from Kawasaki Dockyard in Kobe. Two of this batch were built to a design of large, twin-screw cargo ship called the "T" type. Kawasaki completed War Soldier in June 1917, followed by War Sailor that August.

War Sailor's registered length was 445.0 ft (135.6 m), her beam was 58.3 ft (17.8 m), her depth was 31.3 ft (9.5 m), and her draught was 26 ft 5 in (8.05 m). Her tonnages were 7,522 GRT, 4,592 NRT, and 10,400 DWT. Each of her screws was driven by a Kawasaki three-cylinder triple-expansion engine. The combined power of her twin engines was rated at 659 NHP and gave her a speed of 12 knots (22 km/h). Furness, Withy registered her in London. Her UK official number 140430 and her code letters were JRVK.

== Hatarana ==
In 1919 Union-Castle Line acquired War Soldier and renamed her Ripley Castle, while British India Steam Navigation Company (BI) acquired War Sailor and renamed her Hatarana. BI employed her on its Far East cargo service, sailing to either Calcutta or London according to season.

The ship was equipped for wireless telegraphy from new. By 1930 her call sign was GRZW, and in 1934 this superseded her code letters.

During the Second World War, Hatarana sailed mostly unescorted, and only occasionally in convoy. She traded mostly within the Indian Ocean, sailing between Burma, India, Ceylon, Australia, Aden, Tanganyika, Zanzibar, Kenya, Egypt, and Mauritius. She occasionally visited the Mediterranean, passing through the Suez Canal and back. She called at Haifa in Palestine in November 1940 and October 1941, and at Beirut in Lebanon in January 1942.

== Loss ==
On 31 May 1942 Hatarana left Karachi. She called at Durban on 18–26 June and Cape Town from 30 June to 10 July. On 25 July she arrived off Freetown in Sierra Leone, where she waited to join a convoy to the UK. On 4 August she left Freetown with SL 118: a convoy of 37 merchant ships bound for Liverpool.

At 18:52 hours on 18 August U-214 attacked the convoy, firing four single torpedoes. Two hit and sank the Netherland Line cargo steamship Balingkar, one damaged the armed merchant cruiser HMS Cheshire, and one damaged Hatarana. A rescue tug was sent from Gibraltar. However, Hatarana was then abandoned, and the tug was recalled. The steamship Corabella rescued 88 survivors, and the Flower-class corvette HMS Pentstemon rescued 20. Pentstemon sank the damaged Hatarana by gunfire at position 41°07′N 20°32′W, and later landed the survivors at Derry.

Hatarana's Master on her final voyage was Captain Percival James (1887–1967), the brother of actor Clifton James. Another survivor was the future helicopter entrepreneur Alan Bristow.

== Bibliography ==
- Burrell, David (1992). Furness Withy 1891–1991. Kendal: World Ship Society. ISBN 0-905617-70-3.
- Haws, Duncan (1979). The Ships of the Union, Castle, Union-Castle, Allan and Canadian Pacific lines. Merchant Fleets in Profile. Vol. 3. Cambridge: Patrick Stephens Ltd. ISBN 0-85059-352-2.
- Haws, Duncan (1987). British India S.N. Co. Merchant Fleets. Vol. 11. Burwash: Travel Creatours Ltd Publications. ISBN 0-946378-07-X.
- Lloyd's Register of Shipping. Vol. II.–Steamers. London: Lloyd's Register of Shipping. 1919 – via Internet Archive.
- Lloyd's Register of Shipping (PDF). Vol. II.–Steamers. London: Lloyd's Register of Shipping. 1934 – via Southampton City Council.
- Mercantile Navy List. London. 1918 – via Crew List Index Project.
- Mercantile Navy List. London. 1920 – via Crew List Index Project.
- Mercantile Navy List. London. 1930 – via Crew List Index Project.
