= United Airlines (disambiguation) =

United Airlines is a major American airline.

United Airlines may also refer to:

- China United Airlines, a Chinese airline
- United Airlines Uganda, a Ugandan airline
- United International Airlines, a former cargo airline

== See also ==
- United Airways (disambiguation)
