= Morton Air Services =

British airline

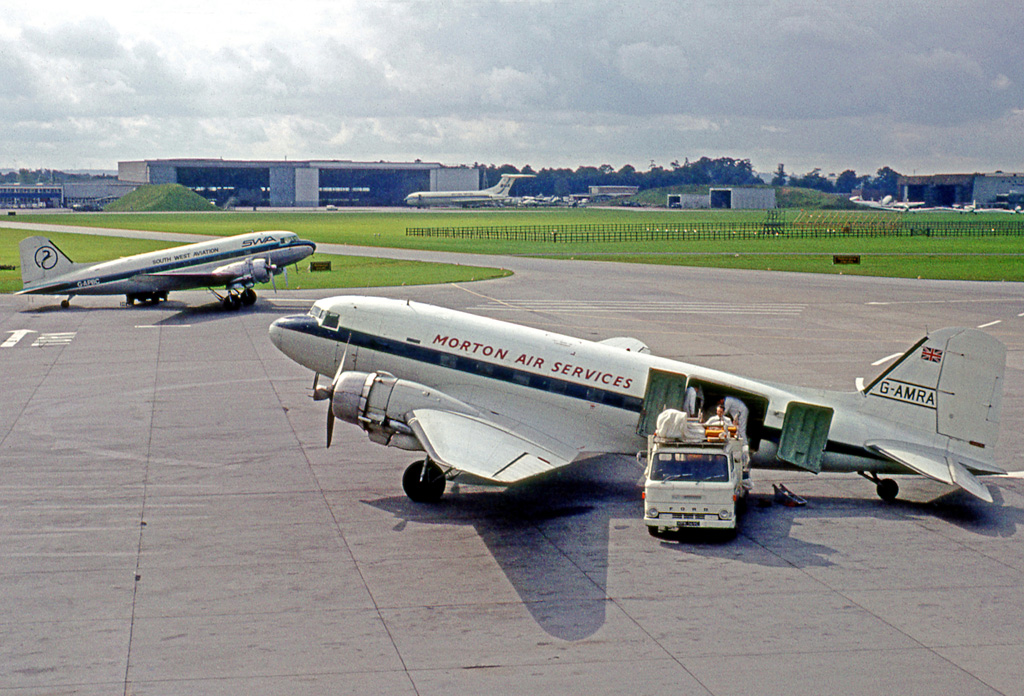
- Douglas C-47B Dakota freighter at London Gatwick Airport in 1968
IATA	ICAO	Call sign
MT	—	—
- Founded: 1945
- Commenced operations: 1946
- Ceased operations: 1968 (merged into British United Island Airways)
- Hubs: Croydon Airport (1945 — 30 September 1959); London Gatwick Airport (1 October 1959 — 31 October 1968)
- Fleet size: 14 aircraft (1 de Havilland DH 114 Heron, 8 de Havilland DH 104 Dove, 3 de Havilland DH 89 Dragon Rapide, 2 Airspeed Consul (as of April 1958))
- Destinations: British Isles, Continental Europe
- Headquarters: Croydon Airport (1945 — 30 September 1959); London Gatwick Airport (1 October 1959 — 31 October 1968)
- Key people: T.W. Morton, G.P. Olley, J. Fargher, P. Eskell

Morton Air Services Ltd. was one of the earliest post-World War II private, independent (Note: independent from government-owned corporations) British airlines formed in 1945. It mainly operated regional short-haul scheduled services within the British Isles and between the United Kingdom and Continental Europe. In 1953, Morton took over rival independent UK airline Olley Air Service. In 1958, Morton became part of the Airwork group. Morton retained its identity following the 1960 Airwork-Hunting-Clan merger that led to the creation of British United Airways (BUA). The reorganisation of the BUA group of companies during 1967/8 resulted in Morton being merged into British United Island Airways (BUIA) in 1968.

== History ==
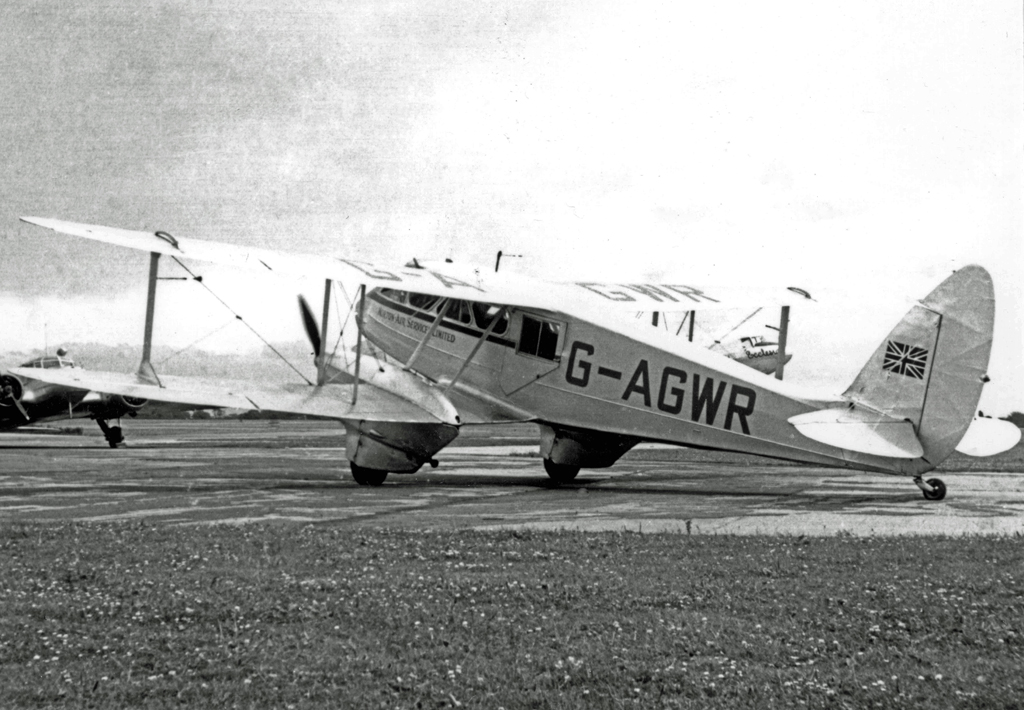
DH 89 Dragon Rapide at Manchester Airport in 1950

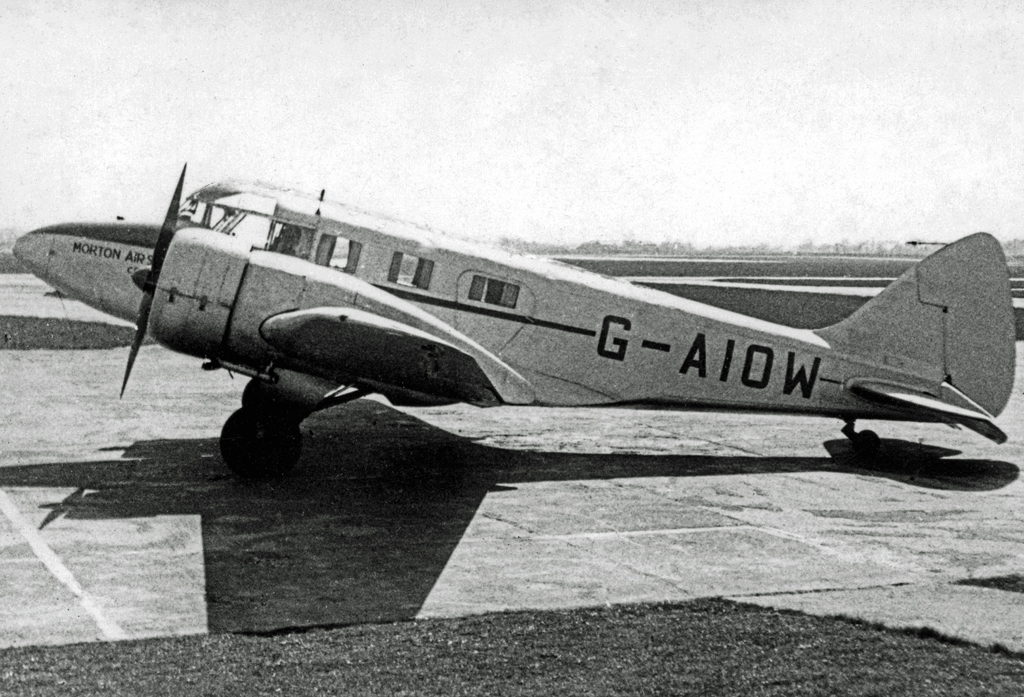
Airspeed Consul in 1951

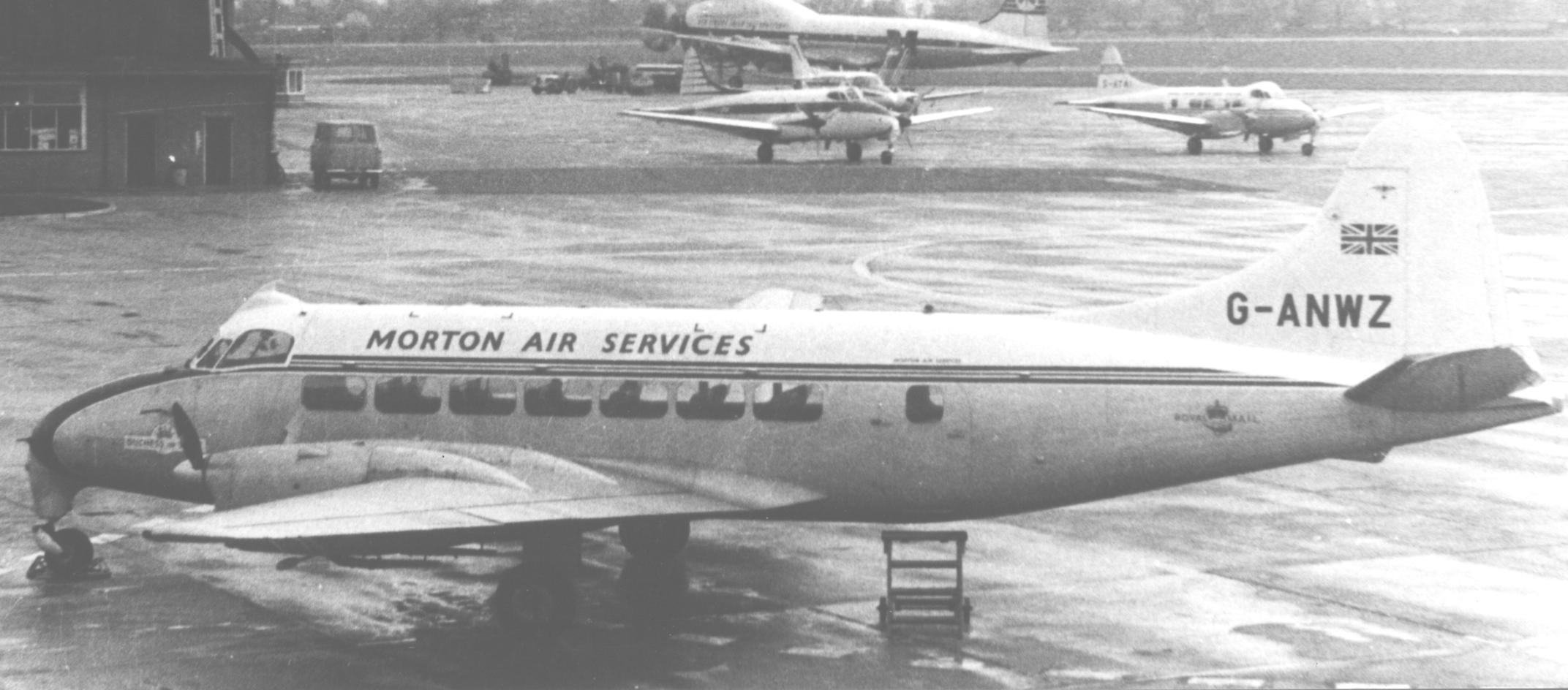
MDH 114 Heron 1B in 1965

In May 1945, former Royal Air Force pilot Captain T.W. "Sammy" Morton founded Morton Air Services Ltd. Prior to Morton's inception, "Sammy" Morton had flown scheduled services from London's old Croydon Airport to Paris Le Bourget with Amy Johnson in the 1930s Flight operations started in January of the following year.

By the early 1950s, Captain Morton had built up a fleet of Airspeed Consul (see heading image) and De Havilland Dragon Rapide aircraft and these were soon supplemented by more modern de Havilland Dove piston airliners to operate regular charter flights. These included general charter work, air ambulance services and racecourse charters. The latter's regularity was such that it amounted to a "quasi-scheduled" operation. Morton subsequently won traffic rights to operate fully fledged scheduled services from Croydon to the Channel Islands, Deauville, Le Touquet and Rotterdam.

Morton sold a minority stake of about 20% to rival independent airline Skyways. When that airline was taken over by the Lancashire Aircraft Corporation (LAC), another contemporary independent airline, LAC acquired ownership of Skyways's minority holding in Morton Air Services as well.

In February 1953, Morton Air Services gained control of its independent rival Olley Air Service. Following the takeover of Olley Air Service, this airline's operations were wholly integrated into Morton's but the Olley name would survive for certain services until 1963.

In 1958, Morton sold out to Airwork. The same year, Airwork started the process of merging with Hunting-Clan to form BUA. On 30 September 1959, a Morton Air Services de Havilland Heron (G-AOXL) operated the last scheduled passenger flight to depart Croydon. The aircraft was headed for Rotterdam. Another Heron, repainted to represent that aircraft currently (2011) guards the entrance to Croydon's Aerodrome Hotel.) By the following morning, the airline's entire operation — including its headquarters — had been relocated to Gatwick.

Although Morton's scheduled services were integrated into BUA's regional operations following the creation of that airline in July 1960, the Morton name survived until the completion of the BUA group's 1967/8 reorganisation. It finally disappeared on 1 November 1968. This was the day Morton was absorbed into BUIA, BUA's new regional affiliate.

=== Olley Air Service ===
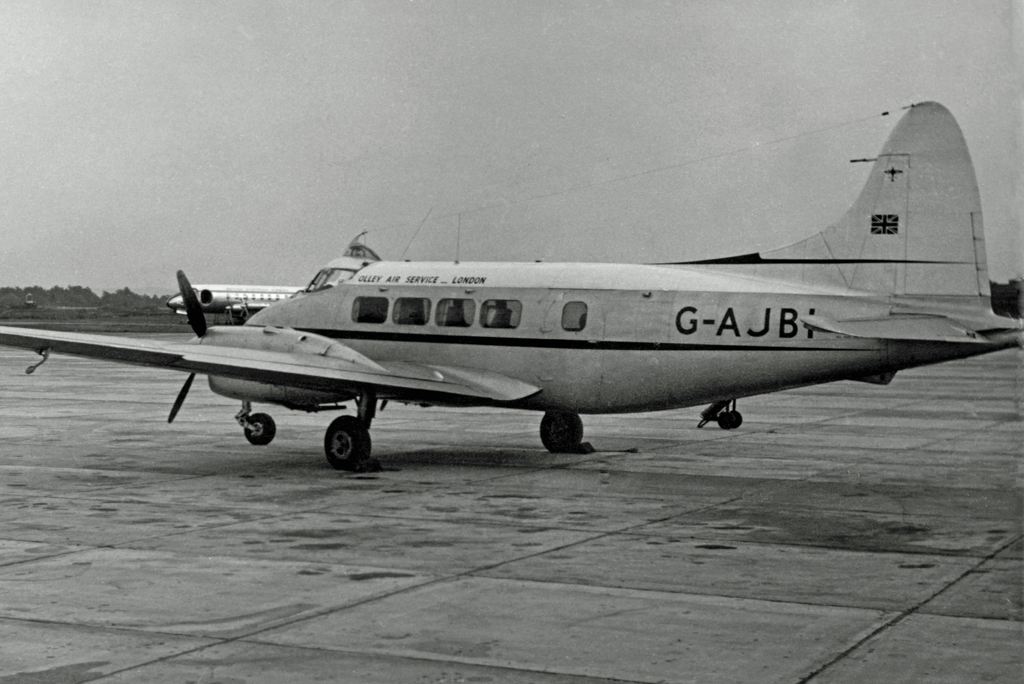
Olley Air Service De Havilland Dove operating a charter flight at Manchester Airport in 1954

In January 1934, Gordon Olley, a former pilot with Handley Page Transport and Imperial Airways, founded Olley Air Service Ltd. It was primarily a charter airline and headed a group of airlines that included Blackpool & West Coast Air Services, Channel Air Ferries and Isle of Man Air Services. These airlines were all taken over in 1935 and 1936. Channel Air Ferries assumed Olley's scheduled air services to and from the Channel Islands, while Blackpool & West Coast Air Services operated scheduled flights between the UK and Ireland as well as to/from the Isle of Man. The former were jointly operated with Aer Lingus using the Irish Sea Airways brand. The latter transferred to Isle of Man Air Services, following which Blackpool & West Coast Air Services shortened its name to West Coast Air Services.

In 1938, the Olley group formed a new joint venture airline with two contemporary railway companies under the name Great Western & Southern Air Lines. Over the next year, Great Western & Southern Air Lines took over the scheduled routes of Channel Air Ferries.

Following the end of World War II, Olley Air Service resumed operations as a charter airline. It subsequently re-entered the scheduled services market on 1 January 1946, but transferred scheduled operations licences to British European Airways on 1 February 1947. Scheduled flight operations were relaunched in 1948 (on B.E.A. behalf), and on 3 June 1949 on its own.

In February 1953, Olley was sold to Morton Air Services, as a result of which the former was absorbed into the latter. Despite Olley's complete integration into Morton, the Olley name was still used for specific services until 1961. After the company name survived as Olley Travel Service Ltd.

== Fleet ==
In April 1958, the combined fleet of Morton Air Services and Olley Air Service comprised 14 aircraft.

Aircraft type	Total in fleet
de Havilland DH 114 Heron	1
de Havilland DH 104 Dove	8
de Havilland DH 89 Dragon Rapide	3
Airspeed Consul	2
Total	14

== Accidents and incidents ==
There are two recorded fatal accidents involving Morton Air Services aircraft.

1. 24 May 1948 - An Airspeed Consul crashed near Cairo airport. No fatalities.
2. 12 May 1950 - An Airspeed Consul was destroyed in a crash off Guernsey killing all four occupants.
3. 14 June 1952 - An Airspeed Consul on a charter from Croydon to Le Mans ditched off Brighton following engine problems. Six on board killed, including pilot Lawrence Page.
4. 31 October 1960 - A de Havilland DH 104 Dove was destroyed beyond economical repair when the hangar collapsed in a heavy storm at Chittagong airport (Pakistan).

== See also ==
- List of defunct airlines of the United Kingdom

== Notes ==
Notes

Citations

== Sources ==
- Eglin, Roger & Ritchie, Berry (1980). Fly me, I'm Freddie. London, UK: Weidenfeld and Nicolson. ISBN 0-297-77746-7.
- "Flight International". Flight International. Sutton, UK: Reed Business Information. ISSN 0015-3710. (various backdated issues relating to Morton Air Services and Olley Air Service, 1934–1968)
