= Jersey Airlines =

Regional airline of the United Kingdom (1948–1963)

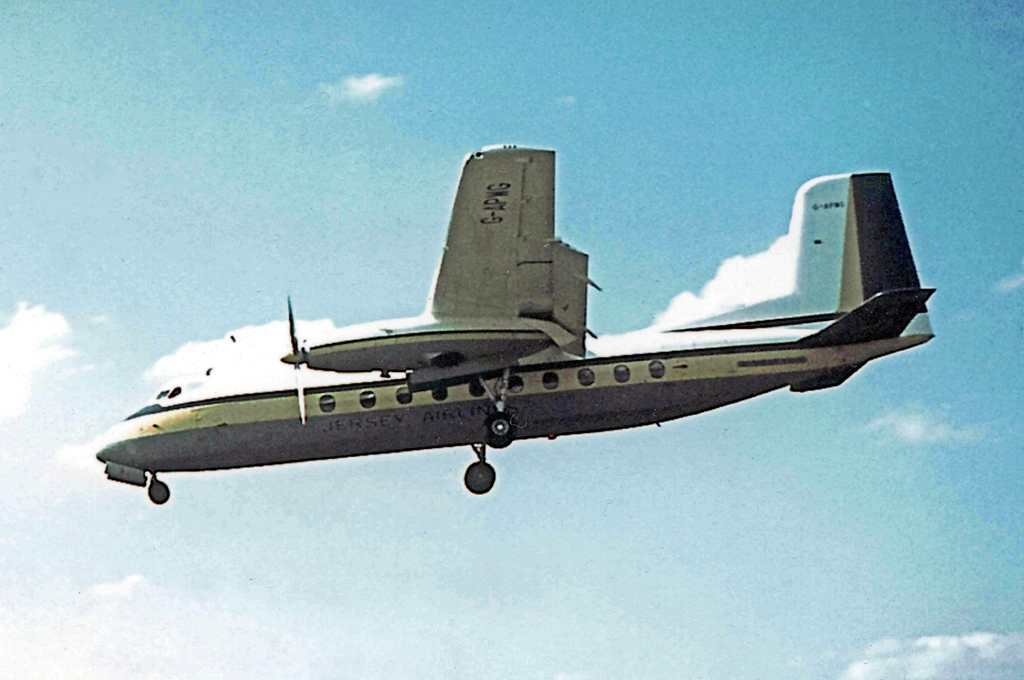
- Handley Page HPR.7 Dart Herald 200
IATA	ICAO	Call sign
JY	—	—
- Founded: December 1948 (as Airlines (Jersey) Ltd.)
- Commenced operations: 9 March 1949 (as Airlines (Jersey) Ltd. dbaas Jersey Airlines)
- Ceased operations: 1 August 1963 (merged to form British United (C.I.) Airways
- Hubs: Jersey; London–Croydon (1948–1958); London–Gatwick (1958–1968)
- Fleet size: 13 (before merger)
- Destinations: UK, Europe
- Parent company: British United Airways (1962–1963); Air Holdings (1963–1968)
- Headquarters: States' Airport, Jersey
- Key people: M.L. Thomas; Capt. B.W. Gardiner; T.C. Chandler; H.F. Popham; Capt. J.A. Spencer; H.I. Allan

Jersey Airlines - legally Airlines (Jersey) Ltd. - was an early post-World War II private, independent (Note: independent from government-owned corporations) British airline established in 1948. In April 1951, the airline operated its first seasonal scheduled service, in 1952 all year round. On 1 November 1962, Jersey Airlines merged to form British United (C.I.) Airways although, operationally, this occurred on January 1, 1963 and, legally, on the following August 1.

== History ==
=== Modest beginnings ===
During the summer of 1948, Welshman Maldwyn L. Thomas was working for a car rental company in St. Helier, Jersey, and arranged ad hoc charters for day trippers to be flown from London's Croydon Airport to Dinard in Brittany, France. Due to the growing popularity of these trips, in November of that year, he decided to form an airline to offer such charter flights on a regular basis. That company was to be incorporated under the name Jersey Airlines Ltd. However, its similarity to an existing company named Jersey Airways Limited, a recently nationalised airline that was absorbed into British European Airways, resulted in the new company being registered as Airlines (Jersey) Ltd. and using Jersey Airlines as the trading name.

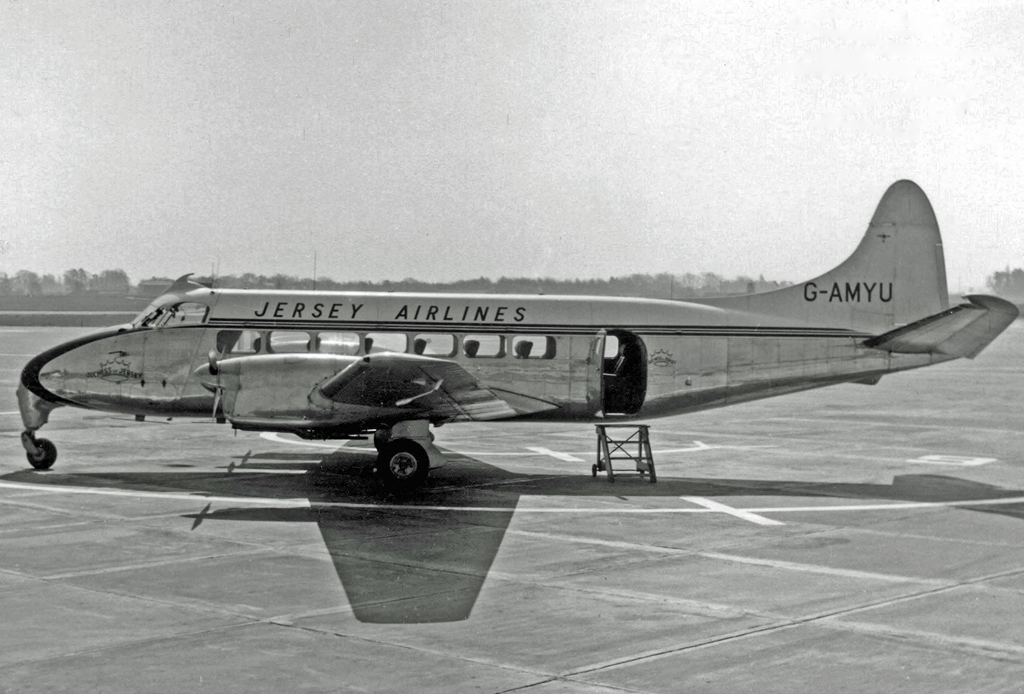
Heron 1B at Manchester (Ringway) Airport in April 1955 after a flight from Jersey

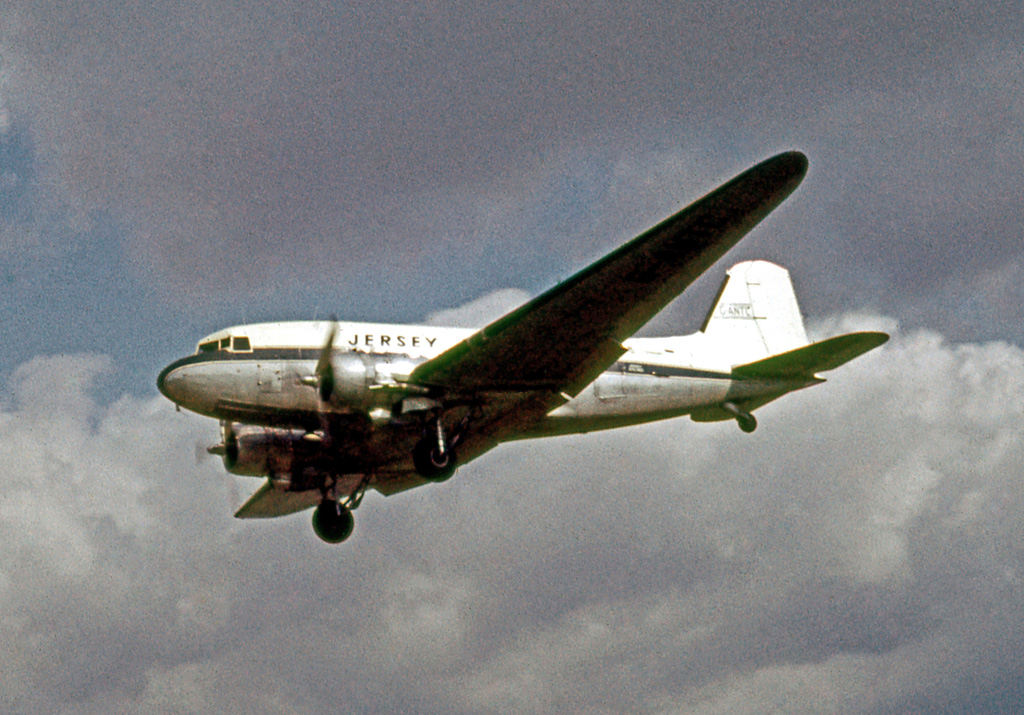
Douglas DC-3 Dakota landing at Manchester airport

The first flights began on March 9, 1949, and in April 1951, some routes became scheduled for the summer season. On 7 April 1952, Jersey Airlines entered the scheduled service market all year round. All scheduled services were marketed as Duchess Services. In that same year, British European Airways (BEA) took a 25% minority stake in Jersey Airlines and made it an "associate". This also resulted in BEA acquiring a 25% minority shareholding in Jersey Airlines in 1956 and entailed the transfer of BEA's Southampton—Guernsey and Southampton—Alderney routes. (Note: Southampton—Dinard transferred at a later date) By winter 1956, Jersey Airlines' scheduled route network included Croydon, Bournemouth, Exeter, Manchester, and Southampton in England, Alderney, Guernsey and Jersey from the Channel Islands, (Note: including an inter-island service between the three main Channel Islands) as well as Cherbourg, Dinard, Nantes, Saint-Brieuc and Paris Orly in France and Bilbao in Spain.

=== A true regional airline ===
By May 1958, Jersey Airlines moved its main UK mainland operating base from Croydon to Gatwick. One of the airline's de Havilland Herons operated the first scheduled flight to arrive at the newly rebuilt airport. On the occasion of the 1960 Farnborough Airshow, Jersey Airlines placed an order for four brand-new, 50-seat Handley Page HPR.7 Dart Herald 100/200 series 200 turboprop airliners for delivery the following year. When Mr M.L. Thomas, the airline's chairman and managing director, signed the contract later that year, the number of aircraft on firm order was increased to six aircraft. The first two were to be delivered in 1961, a further two in 1962 and the final two in 1963. Unforeseen design and production problems delayed the delivery of the first batch until summer 1962. To enable Jersey Airlines to introduce the Dart Herald into commercial service at the start of the 1962 summer timetable as planned, Handley Page supplied three interim aircraft - two smaller 44-seat Herald 100s as well as one 50-seat Herald 200. One of the two 100 series aircraft was the Herald's prototype/demonstrator while the other was the first production aircraft to be delivered to BEA. The first of Jersey Airlines' own aircraft sporting the airline's blue and gold livery including the civil air ensign on the tail was finally handed over to the airline in January 1963. Another three aircraft were delivered later the same year, resulting in most scheduled routes being served with the new turboprop type. Jersey Airlines marketed its new turboprops as Herald Class. (The older DC-3 and Heron piston airliners were marketed as Dakmaster Class and Duchess Class respectively.) The seasonal nature of Jersey Airlines' scheduled operation compelled it to charter Heralds to Lord Brothers, a contemporary package tour operator, as the summer season drew to a close. These planes flew British holidaymakers as far afield as Spain, Morocco, the Canary Islands as well as Athens and the Greek islands.

In 1961, Jersey Airlines carried 310,000 scheduled passengers. The same year, BEA terminated its association agreement with Jersey Airlines as both airlines had become competitors on London-Jersey and London-Guernsey, (Note: using Heathrow and Gatwick as BEA's and Jersey Airlines' respective London terminals) the most important routes in the London-Channel Islands market, as a result of the Civil Aviation (Licensing) Act that had been enacted the year before. This had abolished the corporations' statutory monopoly on principal domestic and international scheduled routes.

Something was already moving behind the small but active regional airline, however. The BUA group's takeover of Jersey Airlines in May 1962 followed BEA's disposal of its minority holding in its former regional "associate" on 31 March of that year. Together with the earlier acquisition of the British Aviation Services group, the Jersey Airlines takeover expanded the BUA group fleet to more than 100 aircraft and increased its payroll to 6,000. It also made BUA bigger than British Overseas Airways Corporation (BOAC) in terms of scheduled passengers carried. By that year's summer, Plymouth, Coventry, Glasgow and Belfast were added to the scheduled route network in the UK, while Amsterdam Schiphol, Nice, Quimper, Dublin and Cork joined the international scheduled route network. (Note: scheduled services to Bilbao had ceased in the meantime)

The airline's integration into the BUA Group occurred gradually: formally on 1 November 1962 (for combined use of all Jersey Airlines and Silver City Airways-Northern Division operations), operationally on 1 January of the following year, and officially on 1 August 1963 and Jersey Airlines changed its registered name to British United (C.I.) Airways.

The 1967/8 reorganisation of the BUA group's regional activities resulted in the amalgamation of BUA (C.I.), British United (Manx) Airways and Morton Air Services under the BUIA name. The new entity began trading on 1 November 1968. The new entity began trading on 1 November 1968.

== Fleet ==
Airlines (Jersey) Ltd./Jersey Airlines operated the following aircraft types:

- 12 x DH.89 de Havilland DH 89 Dragon Rapide 3 leased in
- 7 x de Havilland DH 114 Heron
- 9 x Douglas DC-3/C-47
- 1 x B-170 Bristol Freighter
- 9 x Handley Page HPR.7 Dart Herald 3 serie 100 leased in

=== Fleet in 1962 ===
In April 1962, the fleet of Airlines (Jersey) Ltd./Jersey Airlines comprised 13 aircraft.

Aircraft	Number
Handley Page HPR.7 Dart Herald 200	1
Handley Page HPR.7 Dart Herald 100	2
Douglas DC-3 Dakota/C-47 Skytrain	6
de Havilland DH 114 Heron	4
Total	13

== Accidents and incidents ==
There are two recorded accidents. One of these was fatal, the other non-fatal.

1. The first accident on 15 August 1958 was non-fatal. It involved a Jersey Airlines de Havilland DH 114 Heron 1B (registration: G-AMYU) operating a freight flight to Guernsey. When the aircraft was on its final approach to Guernsey Airport, the pilot in command carried out a missed approach due to deteriorating weather conditions. The aircraft's second approach was a tailwind approach in the opposite direction. This resulted in the aircraft touching down on the grass next to the runway. Although the aircraft was damaged beyond repair as a result of continuing to slide sideways across a sunken road, the sole occupant (the aircraft's pilot) survived the accident.
2. The second accident on 14 April 1965 was fatal. It involved a British United (C.I.) Airways Douglas C-47B-20-DK (registration: G-ANTB) operating British United Airways flight 1030X, a scheduled international passenger flight from Paris Orly to Jersey. Despite the deteriorating weather conditions at Jersey's States Airport, the crew decided to continue its approach to runway 27. This approach was abandoned because runway visual range fell below minima. When the aircraft made its second approach, it first hit a tree before striking the outermost pole of the approach light system at a height of 58 ft (18 m), 3,000 ft (910 m) short of the runway threshold. This caused the aircraft to crash into the approach lights and catch fire, which killed 26 of the 27 occupants (three out of four crew members and all 23 passengers).

== See also ==
- List of defunct airlines of the United Kingdom

== Notes ==
Notes

Citations
