= British United Airways Flight 1030X =

Fatal aviation incident in 1965

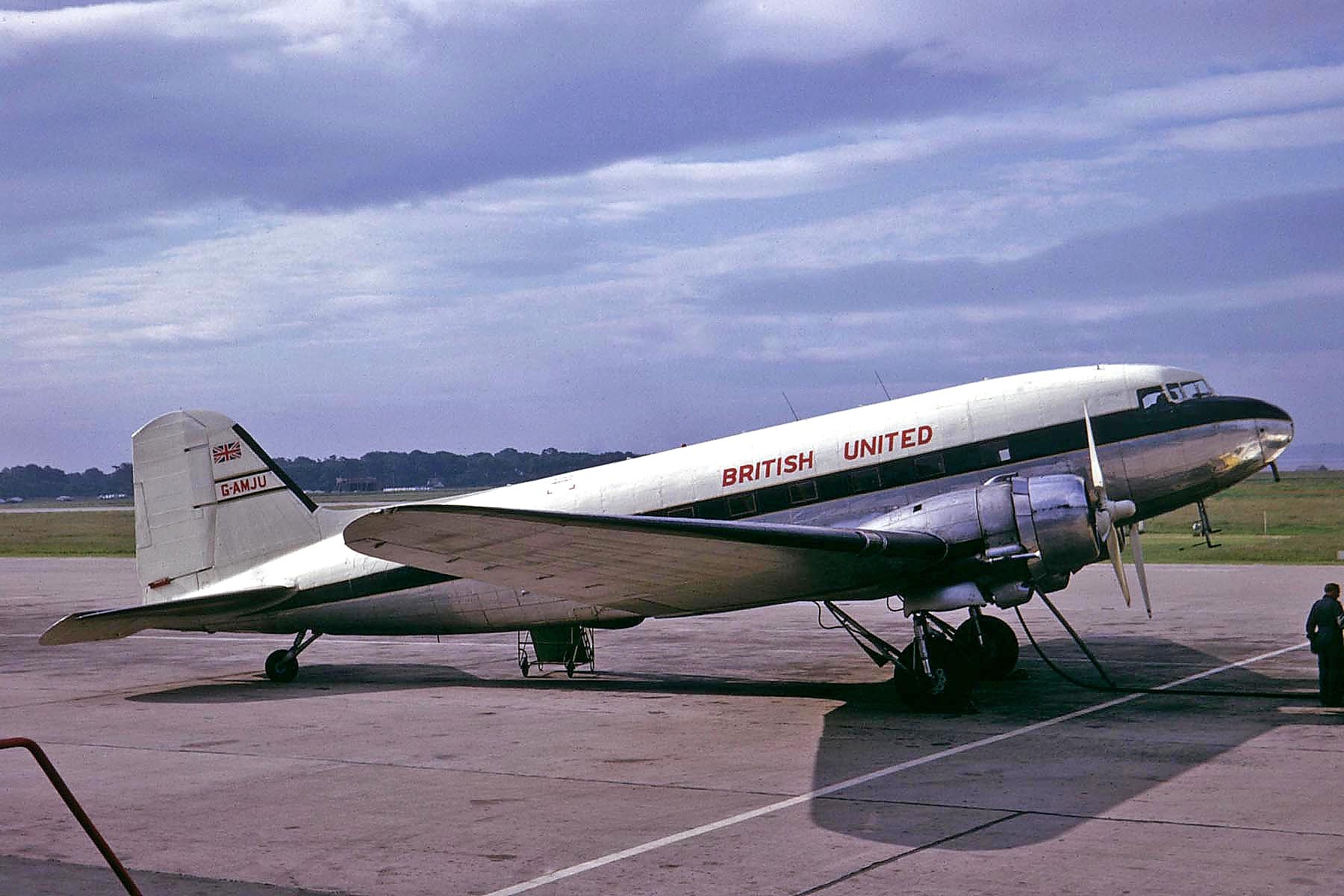
- A DC-3 of British United Airways similar to the accident aircraft

Occurrence
- Date: 14 April 1965
- Summary: Pilot error in fog
- Site: Jersey, Channel Islands; 49°12′21″N 02°13′06″W

Aircraft
- Aircraft type: Douglas C-47
- Operator: British United (C.I.) Airways
- Registration: G-ANTB
- Occupants: 27
- Passengers: 23
- Crew: 4
- Fatalities: 26
- Injuries: 1
- Survivors: 1

British United Airways Flight 1030X crashed on 14 April 1965 on Jersey in the Channel Islands. Poor visibility and low cloud cover resulted in an aborted landing attempt, leading to a second attempt which ended with the Douglas C-47B hitting the outermost pole of the approach lighting system before crashing into a field and catching fire. The crash killed all 23 passengers and three of the crew on board; a flight attendant was the only survivor of the accident.

== The aircraft ==
The aircraft was a Douglas C-47B-20-DK (registration: G-ANTB), converted to a DC-3 for civil use, that had its first flight in 1945, with a total of 18,544 flying hours before the accident. It was being operated by British United (C.I.) Airways, an affiliate of British United Airways.

== Accident ==
British United Airways' extra scheduled passenger flight 1030X took off from Paris-Orly Airport in France to Jersey Airport, Channel Islands, with 27 passengers and crew on board. Low cloud cover at Jersey likely made it hard for the pilots to see the runway, leading to an aborted first landing attempt. On the second landing attempt, the aircraft's starboard wing hit the outermost pole of the approach lighting system at a height of 58 ft (18 m), 3,000 ft (910 m) short of the runway threshold. The impact severed the starboard wing; the aircraft then rolled upside-down and crashed. The flight deck of the aircraft was crushed, and the cabin engulfed in flames. All 23 passengers, most of whom were believed to be French, Italian, Spanish and Portuguese migrant farm workers, along with three of the four crew members, were killed. The only survivor was a French flight attendant who was sitting in the rear of the cabin, which had separated from the remainder of the fuselage following the impact. She was badly injured, with two broken legs.

== Cause ==
The accident investigation concluded that the accident was the result of the pilot attempting to land in visibility that was far below that laid down by the airline's procedures. The weather in the Channel Islands had been poor all day, with many flights cancelled. Despite being informed during the flight of the poor and deteriorating conditions, the pilot elected not to divert to another airport. The accident report recommended considering mounting approach lights on frangible masts to avoid a similar catastrophe, and further recommended a re-consideration of regulations for operating in poor weather.
