= Isle of Man Air Services =

Domestic airline from the Isle of Man, 1937–1947

Isle of Man Air Services Ltd (IoMAS) was a small airline, based at Ronaldsway Airport Isle of Man, which operated scheduled flights to the English and Scottish mainland between formation in September 1937 and nationalisation in January 1947.

== History ==
Railway Air Services (RAS) had operated scheduled services to the Isle of Man from 20 August 1934. From 15 April 1935, the operating name used for RAS services to the island was "The Manx Airway". Olley Air Services, founded by Captain Gordon P.Olley, had formed a company named Isle of Man Air Services Ltd. on 21 January 1935 with a share capital of £1,000. In September 1937, IoMAS was reconstructed and enlarged and the capital increased to £75,000. The three companies involved each contributed £25,000: Olley Air Services Ltd, the London Midland & Scottish Railway and the Isle of Man Steam Packet Company.

=== Pre-WWII operations ===
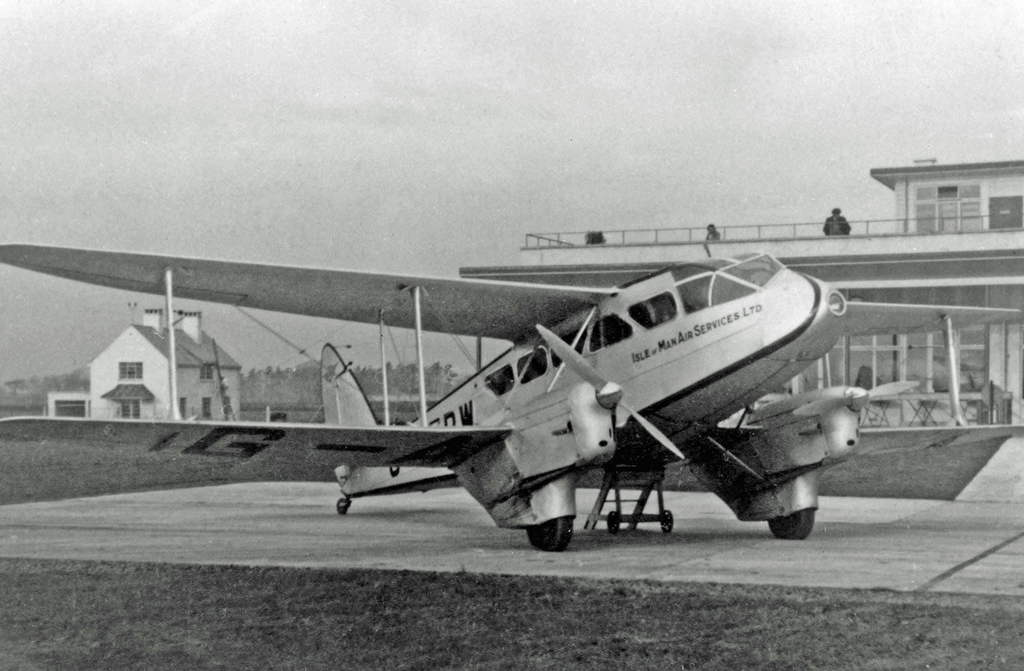
DH.89 Dragon Rapide at Manchester (Ringway) Airport in 1938

The reconstructed airline began scheduled operations on 26 September 1937 using an ex-RAS fleet of six De Havilland Dragon Rapides and one De Havilland Dragon. The initial frequency was two return services each weekday over the Manchester-Liverpool-Blackpool-Isle of Man route, plus one daily return service Liverpool-Isle of Man-Belfast. IoMAS flights to Manchester initially served Manchester (Barton) Aerodrome.

Following the completion of the larger and better laid-out Manchester (Ringway) Airport, IoMAS services switched to the new airport from 26 July 1938. Scheduled services by Isle of Man Air Services ceased temporarily at the outbreak of war.

=== Operations in WWII ===
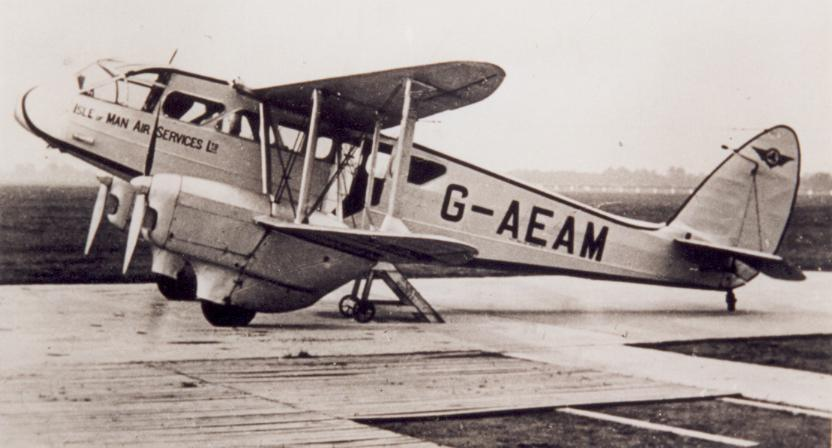
Isle of Man Air Services DH.89 Dragon Rapide at Manchester (Ringway) Airport in 1939.

IoMAS were permitted to resume a limited schedule of flights from 20 November 1939 serving the Isle of Man-Liverpool and Isle of Man-Belfast routes. However, the Belfast flights were soon suspended as a result of government orders prohibiting civil air traffic between the IoM and Northern Ireland. The Associated Airways Joint Committee (AAJC) was set up on 5 May 1940 to co-ordinate the air services of the seven UK internal airlines involved, including IoMAS. Services were suspended during the Dunkirk evacuation in mid/late May, but the civil aircraft were not used to repatriate troops because of the vulnerability of the unarmed aircraft. The limited services to the IoM were resumed on 3 June. On these and other UK services, government and military passengers had priority over normal traffic.

=== Postwar operations ===
IoMAS services gradually returned to a more normal pattern during 1946, and from 15 April, the airline's fleet of four Dragon Rapides operated seven return flights to Liverpool on weekdays. During the peak summer period, the airline also operated two return services each weekday from Ronaldsway to each of Blackpool, Carlisle, Glasgow and Manchester. The Belfast route was resumed on 12 November.

The Civil Aviation Act 1946 created a nationally owned British European Airways (BEA) on 1 August 1946. The AAJC companies, including IoMAS were permitted to continue operating their UK routes until 1 February 1947, when BEA took over the aircraft, staff and routes of the four remaining airlines, including IoMAS, which then ceased to exist.

== See also ==
- List of defunct airlines of the United Kingdom
