= Alan Bristow =

British business man

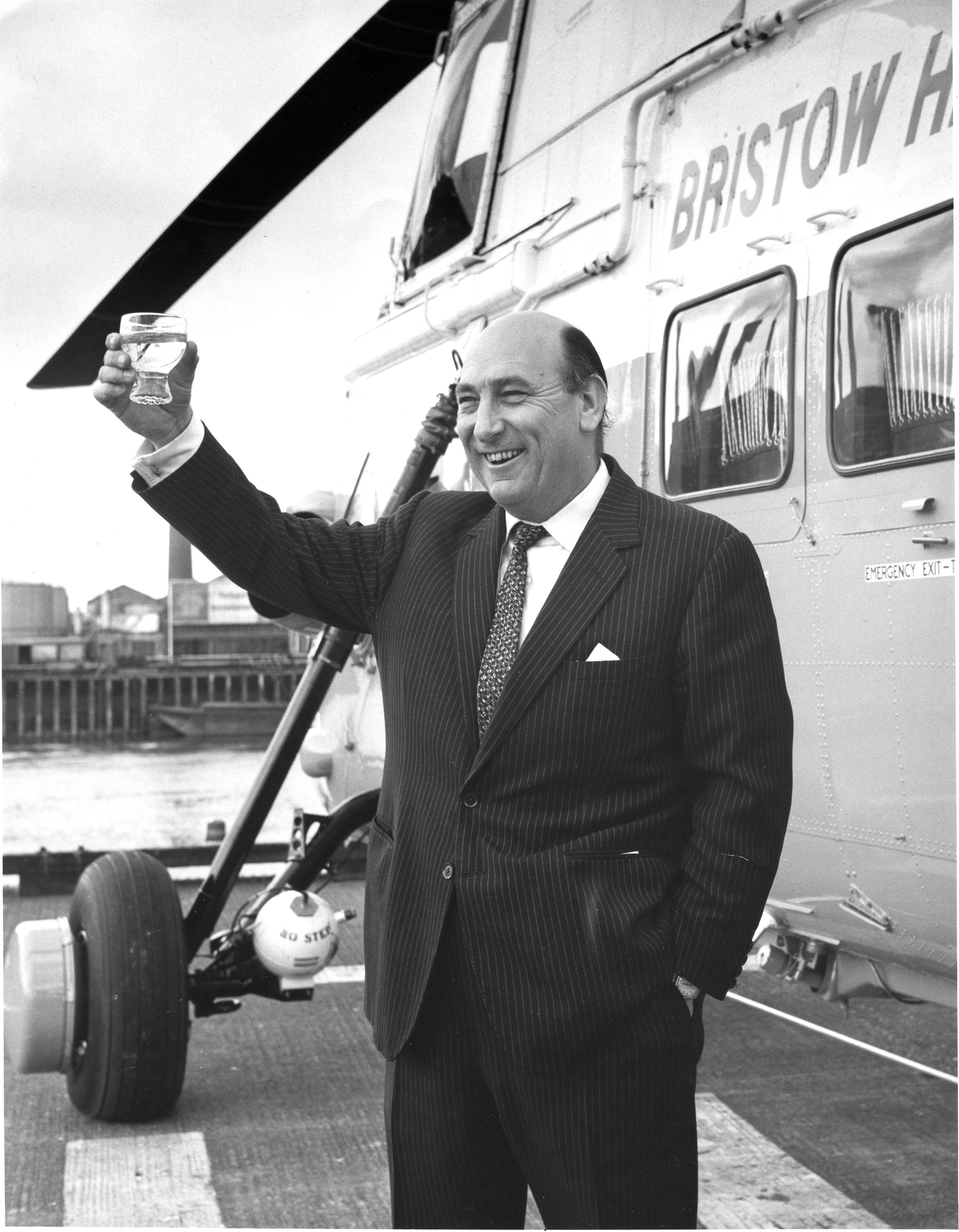
Alan Bristow

Alan Edgar Bristow, OBE, FRAeS (3 September 1923 – 26 April 2009) founded one of the world's largest helicopter service companies, Bristow Helicopters Ltd, which prospered primarily in the international oil and mineral exploration and extraction industries, but also spread into search and rescue, peacekeeping and other fields.

== Early life ==
Born in Balham, south London, on 3 September 1923, Alan Bristow was raised first in Bermuda, where his father Sydney was in charge of the Royal Naval Dockyard, and later in Portsmouth, England, when his father was promoted. At Portsmouth Grammar School Bristow was a contemporary of the author James Clavell, who remained a lifelong friend and wrote a book, Whirlwind, about one of Bristow's riskier exploits.

== World War II ==
After World War II broke out, on his 16th birthday in 1940 Bristow joined the British-India Steam Navigation Company as a deck officer cadet. He twice had ships sunk under him: the SS Malda, by Japanese warships in the Bay of Bengal on 6 April 1942; and the SS Hatarana by the German submarine U-214 on 18 August 1942. He was present at the evacuation of Rangoon and the Operation Torch landings in North Africa. Bristow was credited with shooting down two Stukas from the forepeak of an ammunition ship off the coast of Algeria.

In 1943, Bristow joined the Fleet Air Arm as a trainee pilot. Trained by the RAF in Canada, he was trained on the Fairchild Cornell and North American T6 Harvard. In 1944, he was sent to Floyd Bennett Field, New York, to learn to fly the difficult Sikorsky R-4 helicopter, the world's first mass-production military helicopter. In 1946 he became the first Briton to land a helicopter on the deck of a naval frigate at sea.

== Career ==
After demobilisation he joined the Westland Aircraft Company as its first helicopter test pilot, but was sacked for attacking the company's sales manager.

=== Bristow Helicopters ===
As a freelance helicopter pilot, he sprayed crops in France, the Netherlands and North Africa. Starting his own helicopter trading and operating company, in 1949 while in Indochina trying to sell Hiller 12A helicopters to French Army forces, Bristow rescued a group of French soldiers using one of his own helicopters, while they were under attack from Viet Minh mortar fire. He was subsequently awarded the Croix de Guerre. Bristow then provided helicopter spotting services for Aristotle Onassis's pirate whaling fleet in the Antarctic.

Bristow started operating flights in aid of oil exploration in the Persian Gulf. Engaged by the former RAF fighter ace Douglas Bader, his company became highly profitable and Bristow a wealthy man. In the 1960s, Bristow sold a stake in his business to a consortium led by Freddie Laker, having tossed a coin in the course of an extended lunch to decide the valuation of the shares. Bristow won, and the funds enabled him to buy the 2,000 acres (810 ha) Baynards Park estate in Surrey.

Bristow Helicopters Ltd eventually expanded to cover most of the globe outside Russia and Alaska, with notable profit centres in the British North Sea, Nigeria, Iran, Australia, Malaysia and Indonesia. For his services to aviation he was honoured with an OBE in 1966.

Bristow's reign over the British helicopter sector came to an end in 1985 after he had a falling-out with Lord Cayzer, whose family holding company British & Commonwealth was one of the shareholders brought in by Laker. Bought out by the Cayzers, Bristow retired and the company's fortunes declined with the North Sea oil industry.

=== Westland Affair ===
In April 1985, Bristow formed a consortium called Bristow Rotorcraft to launch an £89 million bid for his former employer, Westland Helicopters, which was initially rejected. After the Government of Margaret Thatcher had forced the board to accept, Bristow was threatening to pull out unless he was given assurances of new Ministry of Defence orders and the cancellation of a £40 million "launch aid" loan from the government. Bristow withdrew his bid in June 1985, by which time Westland preferred an agreement with the American company Sikorsky Aircraft. However, the Defence Secretary Michael Heseltine MP demanded a "European" solution, and resigned spectacularly after a cabinet row to create the Westland Affair. The resultant disputes within the Conservative Party resulted in the resignation of Leon Brittan as Secretary of State for Trade and Industry. Bristow claimed to have been offered a knighthood if he would return to the negotiating table to help the government out of its embarrassment. Westland was eventually bought by Sikorsky.

=== Other interests ===
In 1968, Bristow took over from Laker as the chairman of independent airline British United Airways. After leading the 1970 merger with Caledonian Airways to form British Caledonian, he then returned to chair Bristow Helicopters.

A keen equestrian, Bristow represented Great Britain at four-in-hand carriage driving with the Duke of Edinburgh. In the late 1980s, he developed an, ultimately unsuccessful, driverless urban rapid transit system called Briway. In the 1990s Bristow invented a waterbed for dairy cattle; his animal bedding is sold internationally.

== Personal life ==
Twice married, he had a son Laurence, a professional racing driver, and a daughter by his first wife, Jean. He died on 26 April 2009, aged 85, survived by his son and by his second wife, Heather.
