= British United Airways =

Private airline of the United Kingdom (1960–1970)

IATA	ICAO	Call sign
BR	BR	BRITISH UNITED
- Founded: July 1960 (amalgamation)
- Ceased operations: 30 November 1970 (merged with Caledonian Airways to form British Caledonian)
- Hubs: London–Gatwick (1964–1970); London–Stansted (1960–1964)
- Alliance: Aviation Traders (1960–1968); Channel Air Bridge (1960–1962); Morton Air Services (1960–1968); Bristow Helicopters (1960–1970); Gambia Airways (1960–1970); Sierra Leone Airways (1960–1970); Uganda Aviation Services (1960–1970); BUA (C.I.) (1962–1968); British United (Manx) Airways (1962–1968); Silver City Airways (1962–1963); British United Air Ferries (1963–1967); British United Island Airways (1968–1970)
- Parent company: Air Holdings (1961–1968); BUA (Holdings) (1968–1970)
- Headquarters: Portland House, Central London (1960–1968); Gatwick Airport (1968–1970)
- Key people: Sir Anthony Cayzer; Sir Nicholas Cayzer; Sir Myles Wyatt; Sir Freddie Laker; Max Stuart-Shaw; Alan Bristow; Alastair Pugh; Capt. Alan Hellary; Capt. P.A. MacKenzie

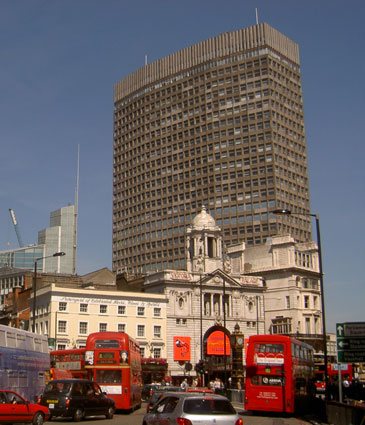
Portland House, the location of the company's headquarters from 1960 to 1968

British United Airways (BUA) was a private, independent (Note: independent from government-owned corporations) airline in the United Kingdom formed as a result of the merger of Airwork Services and Hunting-Clan Air Transport in July 1960, making it the largest wholly private airline based in the United Kingdom at the time. British and Commonwealth Shipping (B&C) was the new airline's main shareholder.

At its inception, BUA assumed the aircraft and operations of its predecessors. These included a fleet of 90 assorted fixed-wing aircraft and helicopters that continued to operate mainly non-scheduled services. Gatwick became BUA's main operating base while Stansted was the main base for trooping flights until 1964.

An order for ten BAC One-Eleven jet aircraft in May 1961 launched BUA's fleet re-equipment programme in support of its long-term policy to develop primarily as a scheduled airline. This was also the first time a private British airline had placed a launch order for a new jet. In January 1962, BUA absorbed British Aviation Services, the holding company of rival British independent airlines Britavia and Silver City Airways. This made BUA the largest unsubsidised airline outside the United States. Silver City's pre-merger status as the main independent provider of air ferry services in the UK also gave BUA a monopoly among UK-based air ferry operators. The subsequent takeover of Jersey Airlines in May 1962 resulted in further growth, giving BUA a fleet of more than 100 aircraft and 6,000 staff.

A city centre check-in facility for BUA's scheduled passengers opened at London Victoria railway station in late-April 1962.

A combined rail-air service linking the city centres of London and Paris that enabled BUA to circumvent regulatory restrictions preventing it from flying London—Paris direct began on 26 May 1963. This was marketed as a cheaper alternative to existing direct air services. The introduction into service of the Vickers VC10 on 1 October 1964 made BUA the first private UK carrier to begin sustained jet operations. BUA's takeover of the South American services of British Overseas Airways Corporation (BOAC) to Argentina, Brazil, Chile and Uruguay on 5 November 1964 marked a major expansion of its long-haul scheduled network.

On 9 April 1965, a BUA BAC One-Eleven became the type's first example to enter commercial service.

The simultaneous launch of daily One-Eleven jet services from Gatwick to Glasgow, Edinburgh and Belfast on 4 January 1966 made BUA the first scheduled all-jet operator on UK domestic trunk routes.

In 1968, the BUA group of companies underwent a major reorganisation to improve its financial performance. This included adoption of a new strategy for BUA that aimed to replace the dwindling number of unprofitable trooping flights with growing engagement in the more rewarding European inclusive tour (IT) and transatlantic affinity group charter markets. It also resulted in relocation of the head office and concentration of engineering activities at Gatwick. Successful implementation of these organisational and strategic changes enabled BUA to make the loss-making South American routes profitable by late-1968 and to become the UK's only profitable mainline scheduled domestic operator by 1969.

By the end of the 1960s, BUA had become the UK's leading private scheduled airline with a 44,000 mi (71,000 km) network spanning three continents — Europe, Africa and South America.

In November 1970, B&C sold BUA to the Scottish charter airline Caledonian Airways for £12 million (£164.6 million today). At that stage, it operated an all-jet fleet of 20 aircraft and employed a staff of 3,000.

== History ==
=== Antecedents and inception ===
Airwork was formed in 1928. During the 1930s, it helped establish the predecessors of the post-World War II national airlines of India, Egypt and Rhodesia.

By the time Airwork merged with Hunting-Clan to form BUA, the former's air transport subsidiaries already included Airwork Helicopters, Air Charter, Bristow Helicopters, Channel Air Bridge, Transair and Morton Air Services. Hunting-Clan was originally known as Hunting Air Travel. It had become Hunting Air Transport and then changed to Hunting-Clan when it was taken over by the Scottish Clan Line shipping company, a B&C subsidiary.

Airwork changed its name to British United Airways on 19 May 1960, which preceded BUA's official formation on 1 July of that year. The origins of the new name went back to United Airways, one of the three predecessors of the pre-World War II British Airways. The [re-]use of the United Airways name together with the prefix British had been agreed with shareholder Whitehall Securities, the controlling shareholder of both United Airways and Spartan Air Lines before these airlines' merger with Hillman's Airways to form the pre-war British Airways.

Following BUA's creation, (Note: involving the amalgamation of 37 companies (including subsidiaries and affiliates)) Blue Star Line, Furness Withy and B&C owned 72% of the new airline's share capital. The remaining 28% was shared among the Clan Line (8%), Loel Guinness (10%) and Whitehall Securities (10%). This ownership structure made the Cayzer family the dominant shareholders. Sir Nicholas Cayzer, the Hon. Anthony Cayzer and Clive Hunting, at the time the Hunting Group's chairman, were appointed to the main board of directors that controlled the BUA group of companies.

In November 1961, the BUA group's shareholders created Air Holdings as a new holding company for the entire group.

In January 1962, British Aviation Services joined the merged entity. Britavia and Silver City Airways were its airline subsidiaries. P&O was the largest shareholder with a 70% stake, while Eagle Star and Cable & Wireless were minority shareholders that owned 20% and 10% respectively of its share capital.

BUA began operations from its new base at Gatwick Airport with a mixed fleet of 43 airliners and 47 helicopters. The former included Douglas DC-3 Dakota/C-47 Skytrain, DC-4/C-54 Skymaster and DC-6 piston airliners as well as more modern Bristol Britannia and Vickers Viscount turboprops. These continued serving the all-economy Safari and colonial coach class (British residents only) routes to East, Central, Southern and West Africa pioneered by both Airwork and Hunting-Clan, as well as operating trooping flights from Stansted under contract to the Ministry of Defence (MoD) and assorted passenger and freight charter flights these airlines and their associates had provided. During its first year of operation, the BUA group's 90-strong fleet flew 17.8 million revenue miles (28.6 million revenue kilometres), carrying 631,030 passengers, 143 million pounds (lb) (64,867 [metric] tonnes (t)) of freight and 25,749 cars (carried by Channel Air Bridge).

In addition to the Safari routes to Africa, BUA also established a network of scheduled services to mainly secondary destinations in Continental Europe, including Barcelona, Gibraltar, Ibiza, Málaga, Le Touquet, Lourdes, Palma, Perpignan, Amsterdam, Rotterdam, and the Channel Islands. BUA furthermore continued Hunting-Clan's Africargo scheduled freight operation. (Note: at the time, Africargo was the only scheduled all-freight service between Europe and Africa) This had given it access to London Heathrow, Hunting's old base, for a limited number of all-cargo services to Africa. Moreover, BUA acted as Sudan Airways's technical advisers and operated that airline's Blue Nile Viscount services between Khartoum and London Gatwick.

BUA (Note: with the exception of Channel Air Bridge) was a full member of the International Air Transport Association (IATA) since its inception as a result of inheriting Hunting-Clan's membership. This included membership of IATA's trade association as well as participation in tariff co-ordination with other member airlines in the organisation's annual traffic conferences. BUA also continued Airwork's and Hunting-Clan's participation in various pool agreements with foreign national airlines. On the East African routes, for example, BUA participated in a tripartite pool agreement with BOAC and East African Airways. Participating in revenue-sharing agreements with its foreign counterparts was a prerequisite for securing overseas traffic rights, especially in Africa.

Freddie Laker, BUA's first managing director (MD), used his contacts to British Rail (BR) to create a £100,000 city centre check-in facility in London's West End in a disused part of Victoria station, which opened in late-April 1962. This enabled BUA's scheduled passengers to complete all check-in formalities, including dropping off their hold luggage, before boarding their train to Gatwick.

=== Expansion and fleet rationalisation ===
At its inception, Bristol Britannias operated most of BUA's long-distance charter flights. A large number of these were trooping flights. (Note: between 1960 and 1964, BUA had up to nine Britannias stationed at Stansted to carry troops under contract to the MoD; BUA's long-haul trooping flights to the Far East ceased on 1 October 1964, when it lost the contract to British Eagle)

Developing BUA primarily as a scheduled airline was one of the first major policy decisions the BUA group's main board took in the early 1960s. The Civil Aviation (Licensing) Act of 1960, which abolished the statutory monopoly British Overseas Airways Corporation (BOAC) and British European Airways (BEA) had enjoyed on principal domestic and international scheduled routes since the beginning of the post-war era and – theoretically – gave independent airlines equal opportunities to develop scheduled routes in their own right, formed the basis of this decision.

In early 1961, BUA applied to the Air Transport Licensing Board (ATLB), a predecessor of the Civil Aviation Authority (CAA), for a large number of domestic and international short-, medium- and long-haul scheduled route licences to give its scheduled network the critical mass to become financially viable by 1965, and to provide sufficient work for a planned £20 million fleet of new jets comprising four long-haul Vickers VC10s and five short-/medium-haul DH 121 Tridents. BUA's applications included a request for twice-weekly all-economy/colonial coach class flights linking Gatwick with Istanbul, Teheran, Karachi, Delhi, Calcutta, Bangkok and Singapore, with a weekly extension to Hong Kong and Tokyo, respectively. BUA intended to inaugurate its first-ever scheduled services to Asia with DC-6Cs or Britannias, which were to be replaced with the new VC10s at a later stage. The airline planned to charge standard IATA fares on all sectors. In addition, it proposed to offer British residents flying to Singapore and Hong Kong in Skycoach (Note: BUA's re-branded colonial coach class) an 18% discount on the equivalent economy class fares. In May of that year, BUA became the first independent airline in the UK to launch a brand-new jet aircraft, when it placed an order for ten short-/medium-haul BAC One-Eleven 200 series. The same month, the airline placed an order for four Vickers VC10 long-haul jets costing £2.8 million apiece. Laker personally negotiated these orders with both manufacturers. The combined order value was £20 million. At that time, the ATLB conducted a hearing into BUA's applications for over 20 scheduled route licences to enable it to expand the European network to include a number of major trunk routes from its Gatwick base, such as Gatwick to Paris, Milan, Zürich, Amsterdam and Athens, in competition with existing services of BEA from Heathrow. Although the ATLB granted BUA the requested licences for 12 of these routes, the airline was unable to use them without actual traffic rights. These needed to be negotiated on its behalf between the UK Government and its overseas counterparts. Following the ATLB's decision, BUA commenced scheduled services between Gatwick and Tenerife in October 1961 using Viscounts. The same month, the airline started Viscount trooping flights from Gatwick to Germany under contract to the MoD.

At the start of the 1961–62 winter timetable in November 1961, BUA's fixed-wing fleet numbered 43 aircraft comprising Bristol Britannia and Vickers Viscount turboprops, as well as Douglas DC-6 and Bristol 170 Freighter (Note: operated by Channel Air Bridge) piston airliners. Britannias and DC-6s operated to East, Central and Southern Africa, including non-stop Gatwick—Entebbe Britannia services, while Viscounts plied the multistop West African coastal route. Viscounts also served the airline's scheduled routes to the Canary Islands and Continental Europe.

In 1962, Jersey Airlines, a former "BEA associate", and Silver City Airways joined the BUA group of companies. The operations of these airlines were reorganised into British United (C.I.) Airways (BUA (C.I.)), British United (Manx) Airways (Note: Manx Airways had begun its existence as Manx Air Charter in 1947; in 1955, it had become part of British Aviation Services group; by 1958, it had been combined with Air Kruise and Dragon Airways to form Silver City's northern division) and British United Air Ferries. (Note: following the merger of Channel Air Bridge and Silver City Airways on 1 January 1963)

In May 1962, BUA revised the order it had placed a year earlier for four long-haul VC10s to two firm orders and two options; the options were not taken up following BUA's failure to obtain licences from the ATLB to operate scheduled services to Asia

From 20 July 1962, a Vickers-Armstrongs VA-3 hovercraft was operated by BUA and ran from Leasowe embankment on the Wirral Peninsula to Rhyl in North Wales. However, due to varying reasons, including bad weather and technical difficulties, the service was cancelled after its final journey on 14 September 1962.

During the spring of 1963, BUA commenced additional scheduled services linking Gatwick with Lourdes/Tarbes, Barcelona, Palma and Genoa. At that time, the BUA group operated a fleet of 94 aircraft, which carried 1.8 million passengers, close to 200 million lb (90,000 t) of freight and 130,000 cars on an annualised basis.

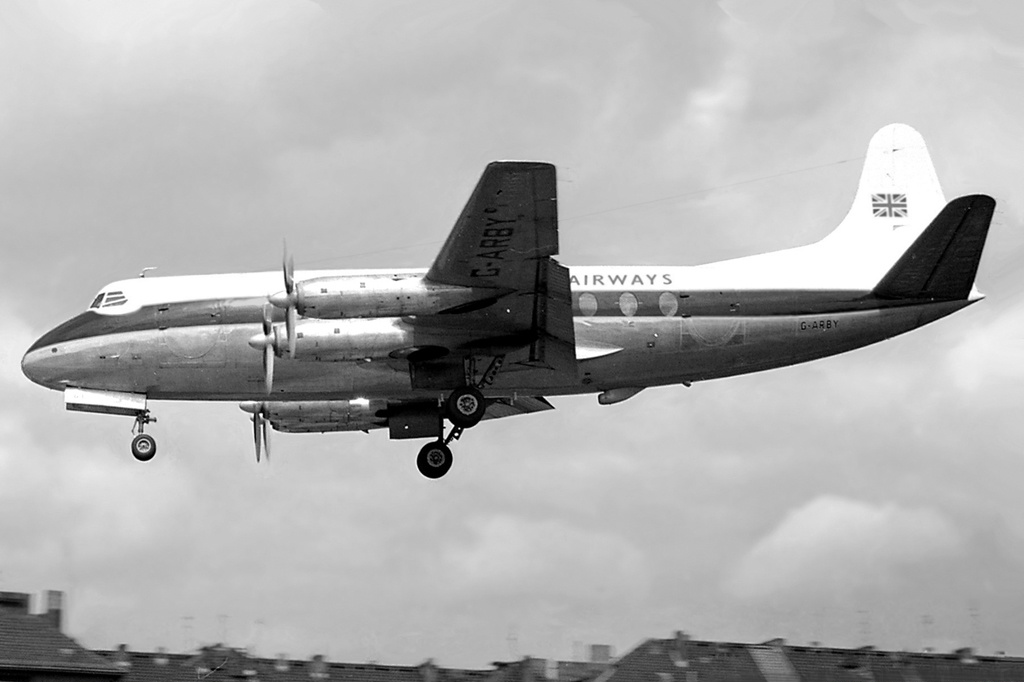
BUA Vickers Viscount 708 G-ARBY in the airline's original livery in 1962. This aircraft operated the inaugural Gatwick — Le Touquet air sector of BUA's London—Paris Silver Arrow rail-air service on 26 May 1963.

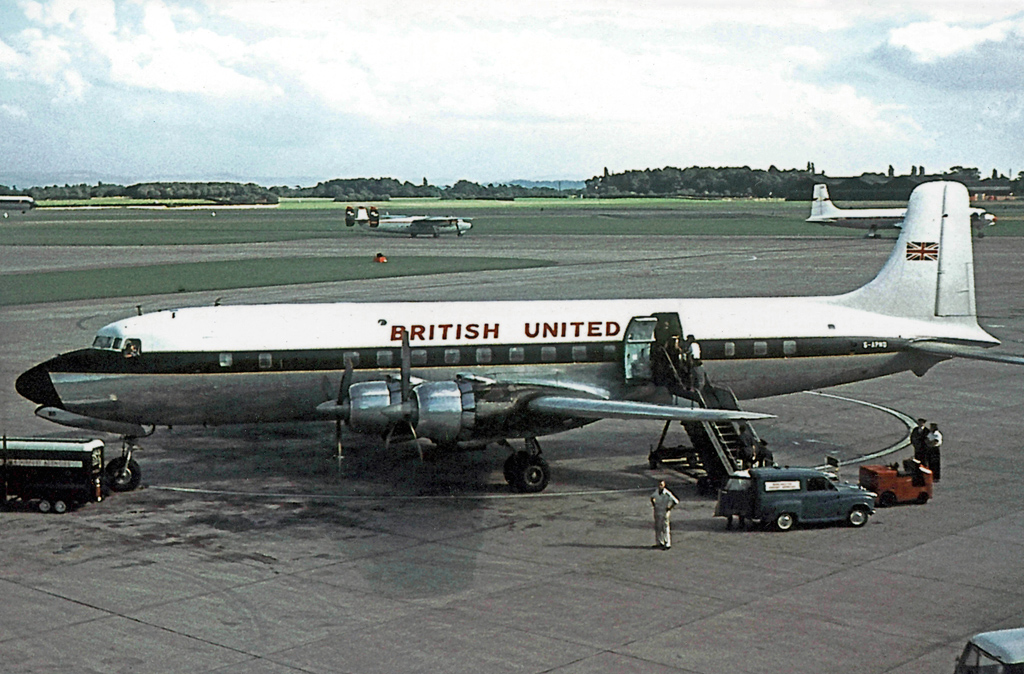
Douglas DC-6A G-APNO in the airline's original livery. Manchester Airport in late-August 1964

On 26 May 1963, BUA began a twice-daily rail-air-rail service between the city centres of London and Paris. The service, which was marketed as Silver Arrow in the UK and as Flèche d'argent in France, was a joint operation between British Rail (BR), BUA and SNCF. At London's Victoria Station, where BUA check-in facilities were available, Paris-bound passengers boarded a BR train to Gatwick Airport railway station. At Gatwick they transferred to a BUA Viscount, which flew them to Le Touquet Airport. At Le Touquet Airport an SNCF train was waiting to take them to Paris's Gare du Nord station. The entire journey took five hours and the minimum return fare was £10 9s. This compared with Skyways Coach-Air's London Victoria Coach Station — Lympne Airport — Beauvais Airport — Paris République Coach Station £11 return coach-air-coach fare. BUA's Silver Arrow service was an example of Laker turning an adversity into an opportunity. BUA's lack of traffic rights prevented it from running non-stop Gatwick—Paris scheduled flights although it held a licence for that route, which the ATLB had awarded it in late 1961. Faced with this restriction, Laker hit upon the idea to offer an indirect travel option between the city centres of London and Paris by combining the existing Victoria—Gatwick rail link with BUA's Gatwick – Le Touquet traffic rights. (Note: BUA inherited these traffic rights from Silver City Airways, which had pioneered Gatwick – Le Touquet DC-3 passenger services in 1953) At the time, Le Touquet Airport was not linked to the French railway network. As a result, the surface journey between the airport and Paris was difficult and time-consuming as this involved an intermodal change between coach and train at Étaples. To overcome this drawback, Laker persuaded the French authorities to build a spur line into Le Touquet Airport so that BUA passengers could be met on arrival by a dedicated SNCF train that took them direct to Gare du Nord train station in the centre of Paris. BUA's new London—Paris rail-air-rail service via Gatwick replaced a coach-air-coach/rail service it had operated on this route via Lydd. BUA Silver Arrow fares were less than what BEA and Air France charged their passengers to fly non-stop between Heathrow and Paris to compensate for the longer travelling times (5 hr (Note: improved train timings and faster trains as well as replacing Viscount turboprops with One-Eleven jets subsequently reduced total travelling time to under 4½ hours, making this service more competitive with non-stop London—Paris flights and Skyways Coach-Air's coach-air-coach London—Paris service) vs. 2 hr 45 min.).

The first of the two VC10s on firm order was handed over to BUA on 11 September 1964. Two days later, the aircraft was displayed at the Farnborough Airshow, where it replaced the larger Super VC10 prototype on the last day of the show. After being ferried to Gatwick the same evening, it began an eight-day series of proving and demonstration flights in East and Central Africa. The payload included Laker and his 1964 Rolls-Royce Silver Cloud.

Commercial VC10 operations commenced on 1 October 1964 with a trooping flight from Gatwick to Aden. (Note: BUA's VC10s were configured in a single-class arrangement featuring 129, rear-facing seats when used for trooping; apart from complying with the MoD's then mandatory rule requiring all aircraft used for trooping flights to be fitted with seats facing rearwards, this seating arrangement also enabled the airline to test customer reaction to aft-facing airplane seats) This made BUA the first British independent airline to commence uninterrupted jet operations.

While negotiations with relevant authorities in the UK and destination countries for the grant of interim operating permits to enable the transfer of BOAC's loss-making routes to South America and to ensure continuity of service were still in progress, BUA's first proving flight to that continent took place on 12 October 1964. It was operated with one of the brand-new VC10s, which carried a small load of VIPs comprising BUA MD Laker and a high-ranking British trade delegation.

On 2 November 1964, the first scheduled passenger service with the type departed Gatwick for Freetown in Sierra Leone, West Africa.

VC10s also replaced Britannias and DC-6s on BUA's routes to East and Southern Africa, where the newly delivered jets took over from the piston/turboprop types on scheduled services from Gatwick to Entebbe, Nairobi, Ndola, Lusaka and Salisbury.

Contemporary bilateral transport arrangements prevented BUA from offering a first class on its East African routes. To compensate for this loss of competitiveness, Freddie Laker came up with the novel idea of designing a cargo door to be installed on the left-hand side of the forward fuselage of the airline's VC10s, where the first class cabin was normally located. This modification permitted the carriage of additional freight instead of first class passengers on the East African routes. BUA's VC10s also had extended wingtips that were slightly bent downwards to reduce the aircraft's cruise drag and to help it overcome the instability encountered when entering a stall, as well as an intermediate, 14-degree flap setting to enable all-year round, nonstop flights from the then relatively short runway at Nairobi's hot-and-high Embakasi Airport to Gatwick with a full payload and reserves.

On 5 November 1964, BUA inaugurated regular scheduled services from Gatwick to Rio, Montevideo, Buenos Aires and Santiago. (Note: the subsequent award to BUA of a 15-year, unrestricted licence and simultaneous revocation of BOAC's existing licences by the ATLB on 1 December 1964 enabled the British independent to officially replace the corporation as UK flag carrier to Argentina, Brazil, Chile and Uruguay) BUA's new South American flights initially operated twice-weekly with alternate stops in Madrid and Lisbon, and a refuelling stop in Las Palmas. São Paulo and a third weekly frequency, which routed through Freetown to/from Buenos Aires, were added subsequently. The third frequency permitted BUA to alter its South American route pattern. As a result, one flight terminated in Brazil and end-to-end travelling times on the new Gatwick – Freetown – Buenos Aires – Santiago service reduced by over two hours compared with the previous routeing. (Note: total end-to-end travelling time of the initial Gatwick – Madrid/Lisbon – Las Palmas – Rio – Montevideo – Buenos Aires – Santiago routeing was 19 hours) The consequent overall capacity increase, including a greater choice of flights and shorter journey times between the UK, Argentina and Chile, made BUA's schedules more competitive with rivals.

In late 1964, Air Ferry joined the BUA group of companies as a consequence of Air Holdings' acquisition of Leroy Tours, Air Ferry's owners, thereby restoring the cross-Channel vehicle ferry services monopoly of British United Air Ferries.

In early April 1965, BUA received the first of the short-haul BAC One-Elevens, for which it had placed the launch order back in 1961, into its fleet. BUA operated the world's first commercial One-Eleven flight on 9 April 1965 from London Gatwick to Genoa.

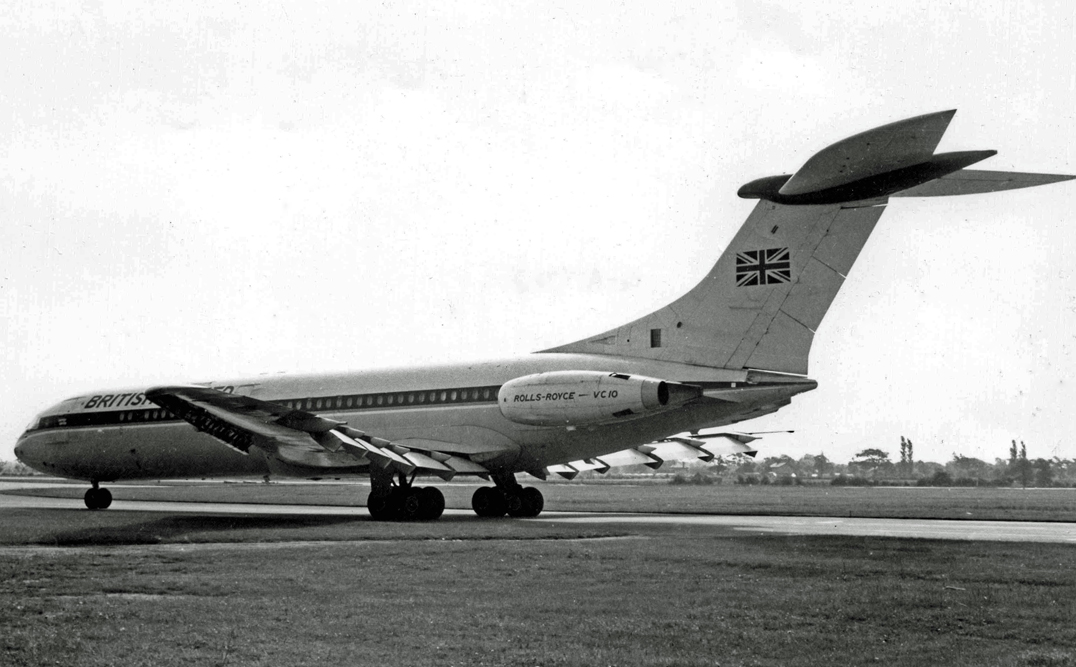
BUA Vickers VC10 1103 G-ATDJ in the airline's original livery, seen at Manchester Airport in 1966.

The expansion of BUA's long-haul flying programme – both scheduled and non-scheduled – resulted in an order for a third VC10 in early May 1965. Technically, BUA took over an order Ghana Airways had cancelled. Practically, this meant that the aircraft was built to BUA's specifications featuring the same cargo door on the left side of the forward fuselage as its sister aircraft, thereby ensuring fleet interchangeability. This aircraft was delivered on 31 July 1965. It entered service in a single-class configuration featuring 127, rear-facing seats to be primarily used for long-haul trooping flights.

On 4 January 1966, BUA commenced domestic scheduled services with the new One-Elevens from Gatwick to Glasgow, Edinburgh and Belfast. (Note: BUA's domestic route launch was delayed by British Eagle's appeal against the ATLB's original decision in early 1964 to award BUA licences to operate domestic feeder services to Glasgow, Manchester and Birmingham to connect with international scheduled and non-scheduled flights from Gatwick within a 24-hour period) These services were branded as InterJet. This made BUA the first UK domestic operator plying trunk routes exclusively with jet equipment. BUA also became the only airline in the world to operate One-Elevens on an intercontinental, long-haul scheduled route, when it introduced the 200 series on its multi-stop West African service linking Gatwick with Lagos via Lisbon, Las Palmas, (Note: involving a night stop for aircraft, crew and passengers) Bathurst, Freetown and Accra.

During August 1966, BUA also introduced a new two-tone, sandstone and blue colour scheme. VC10 G-ASIX was first to appear in the new livery. This was sometimes unofficially referred to as the "hockey stick" livery.

BUA followed up its initial order for ten 200 series One-Elevens with an additional order for five stretched One-Eleven 500s. These were larger capacity aircraft with a higher takeoff weight that were primarily intended for use on the airline's European IT routes. These aircraft joined BUA's fleet from May 1969.

=== Reorganisation ===
At the end of 1965, Laker decided to relinquish his post as managing director and leave the company to set up his own airline. (Note: allegedly due to a disagreement with BUA chairman Myles Wyatt)

Following Laker's departure from BUA, Max Stuart-Shaw was appointed as BUA's new MD. Stuart-Shaw was a former senior manager at Central African Airways. His brief was to oversee the successful implementation of the board's original policy decision taken in the early 1960s to transform BUA into a scheduled airline. Although Laker had largely succeeded in welding the various constituent airlines that made up BUA into a single, integrated enterprise towards the end of his tenure while ensuring the business remained profitable, it lacked the quality of a frontline scheduled carrier. Despite the growth in scheduled activities during that period, the airline was still perceived as mainly a charter and freight operator. When Stuart-Shaw took over from Laker, he strengthened BUA's management organisation by developing the personnel department, expanding the planning unit, as well as reorganising operations and engineering. He also improved the quality of the airline's marketing. As a result, BUA witnessed a major improvement in the quality of its promotional material and in the number of flights departing on time, making its punctuality record one of the UK airline industry's best.

Alan Bristow, the founder of Bristow Helicopters, succeeded Stuart-Shaw as BUA MD in December 1967 following the latter's decision to relinquish the chief executive role only two years after his appointment. (Note: Stuart-Shaw eventually retired early from the group due to poor health) By the time Bristow took over, BUA was losing money.

BUA had recorded its first-ever loss in 1965, mainly as a result of the high depreciation charges its newly acquired jet fleet incurred and substantial losses the ex-BOAC South American routes generated. (Note: the South American routes lost a cumulative total of over £800,000 during their first four years of operation) Over the following two years, the airline's financial situation rapidly deteriorated. In 1966, the loss amounted to £250,000. The following year it almost doubled. Preliminary loss projections released during summer 1967 had shown that a continuation of this trend would produce a negative result of more than £1 million in 1968 and an even higher deficit the year after. This scenario undermined the board's case for additional shareholder funds to finance the purchase of new long-haul jet equipment to replace the remaining Britannias and caused growing anxiety among shareholders, who threatened to withdraw their support unless there was a marked improvement in the airline's long-term prospects.

A detailed analysis of BUA's financial results had shown that raising the airline's profile and quality during Max Stuart-Shaw's tenure meant that costs were growing faster than revenues. Other factors contributing to BUA's rapid cost escalation included high launch costs of several, initially unprofitable scheduled services, as well as an unexpected falloff in traffic as a result of a credit squeeze combined with new overseas travel restrictions due to a tightening of existing exchange controls. This was further compounded by the large number of overheads resulting from the group's complex organisation in which many functions were duplicated and the limited opportunities for independent airlines to operate scheduled services on domestic and international trunk routes in competition with the corporations. (Note: despite the 1960 Licensing Act being the official aviation policy of successive UK governments during the 1960s, Sir Alec Douglas-Home's Conservative Government's support for the independents in their endeavour to mount an effective challenge to the corporations as alternative British scheduled air transport providers was unenthusiastic, while Harold Wilson's Labour Government of that era opposed opening the corporations' routes to additional competition from UK independent airlines)

BUA had built up the high cost base of a major scheduled airline while low-yield charter traffic, a substantial amount of which was fluctuating, low-margin short-haul trooping between the UK and Germany, constituted a large part of its business. On the other hand, scheduled services generated inadequate revenues, which were insufficient to support the airline. Simultaneous development of new scheduled services and integration of existing regional operations in the Channel Islands and on the Isle of Man with the vehicle ferry network proved a costly distraction for overburdened senior sales and commercial managers, taking up a disproportionate amount of their time. Although revenues and the workforce had doubled between 1962 and 1968, total output had risen by less than half over the same period. This translated into a substantial fall in output per employee within that time span and resulted in a weak trading position.

To return BUA to profitability and to secure its long-term future as a viable business, Bristow simplified the unwieldy organisational structure of the BUA group of companies and implemented a new growth strategy.

This entailed splitting Air Holdings into two organisationally independent entities under the control of B&C.

BUA (Holdings) became the new holding company for BUA and British United Island Airways (BUIA), which combined the "second-level" scheduled operations of BUA (C.I.) and British United (Manx) Airways under the new name of Channel Islands and Manx Air Services (CIMAS) and "third-level" charter activities of Morton Air Services, as well as the BUA group's stakes in Bristow Helicopters, Gambia Airways, Sierra Leone Airways and Uganda Aviation Services.

Air Holdings, the old parent company of the unreconstructed BUA group, became a separate holding company for British Air Ferries (BAF) (Note: the new name adopted by British United Air Ferries in 1967) and Aviation Traders, Freddie Laker's old company. It also assumed ownership of Air Ferry, Airwork Services, the BUA group's tour operators (Note: Leroy Tours, Lyons Tours and Whitehall Travel) and the new L-1011 franchise for sales outside the US.

B&C reportedly paid Air Holdings £6 million for the transfer of BUA's ownership to BUA (Holdings).

The BUA group's reorganisation also entailed B&C buying out all of BUA's co-owners other than Eagle Star for £17 million in May 1968. (Note: BUA's change of ownership had come about as a result of the original Air Holdings board finding itself divided over the merits of backing a reorganisation of the group's aviation interests; while B&C, the controlling shareholder and original backer of Hunting-Clan Air Transport, remained committed to its air transport subsidiaries, minority shareholders P&O and Furness Withy, whose involvement in aviation dated back to their early support of Silver City Airways and Airwork respectively, wanted to back out) This gave it a 90.8% stake and left Eagle Star with the remaining 9.2%.

Specific steps Alan Bristow took to reorganise and revitalise the BUA group included

- appointment of four special (executive) directors from BUA to strengthen the BUA (Holdings) board
- formation of a top management team comprising Bristow and the four newly appointed directors
- reorganisation into four main divisions, (Note: engineering, finance, sales and operations) each headed by one of the four new directors
- closure of expensive Central London offices and Southend engineering base to concentrate all head office and as many engineering functions as possible at, or near, Gatwick
- putting in place concrete, long-term development plans for BUA's Gatwick base
- expansion of non-scheduled operations by concentrating on lucrative European IT and transatlantic closed group charters (Note: through non-IATA subsidiary BUA (Services)) at the expense of low-margin trooping
- introduction of incentive schemes to help achieve above-target sales and reward cost-cutting ideas
- implementation of urgent economies in all non-essential areas.
- holding regular staff meetings and making senior managers more accessible to improve internal communications.

These measures were primarily intended to help BUA break even in 1968 and return to profit by 1969. To meet the longer-term objective of transforming BUA into a viable business with a stable future, the airline's top management team got several, more forward-looking developments started. These focused on giving planning and a newly created special projects department direct access to the chief executive and putting greater emphasis on fleet modernisation to enhance BUA's competitiveness, including an urgent re-evaluation of the airline's future long-haul requirements.

An order for five 500 series One-Elevens to meet the airline's future short-/medium haul requirements started the fleet modernisation process. It was followed by the retirement of the remaining turboprops in BUA's mainline fleet (Note: Britannias by end-1968, Viscounts by end-1969) and an evaluation of the Boeing 707 and Super VC10 for its future long-haul requirements, as well as the HS 125 and HP Jetstream as potential replacements for its "third-level" fleet. An important factor in each case was the airline's new strategy to capture a greater share of the non-scheduled market.

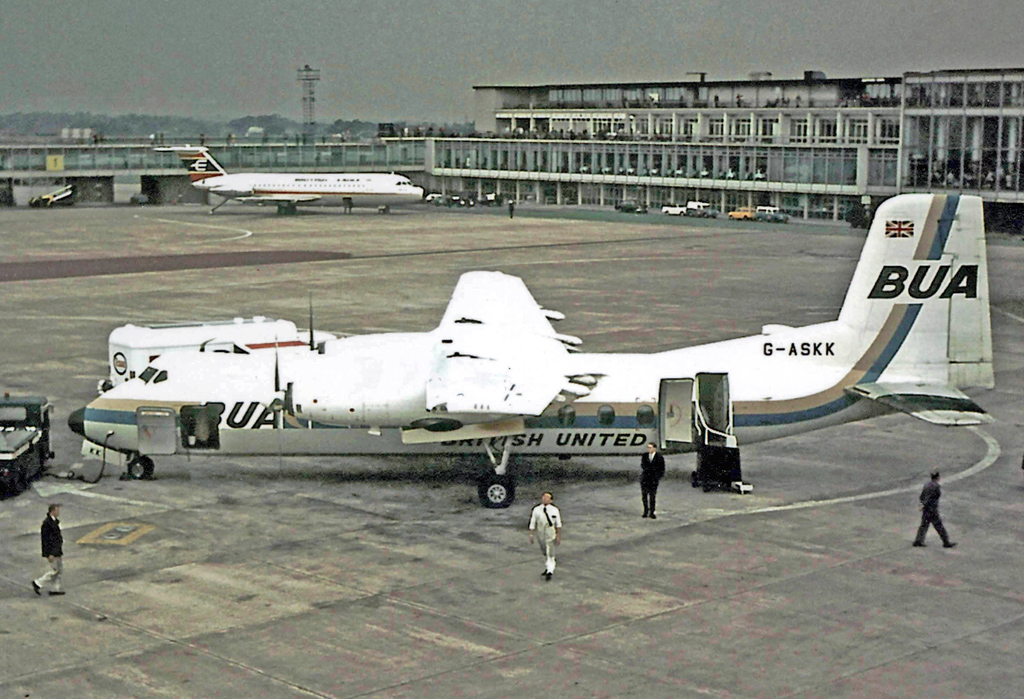
BUA Handley Page Dart Herald 211 G-ASKK in the airline's final livery, at Manchester Airport in 1967.

Using a more logical approach to regroup the wide spread of airline activities into four discrete units concluded the BUA group's reorganisation and revitalisation. As a result, BUA became the group's frontline all-jet operator based at Gatwick; BUIA's CIMAS division provided all "second-level" scheduled services from several regional bases and standardised its fleet on the Herald turboprop, while its Morton Air Services division offered "third-level" air taxi, charter and feeder services; and Bristow Helicopters assumed sole responsibility for all helicopter operations.

A concept called the "two-market philosophy" was the centrepiece of all these developments. This was based on the idea that BUA could only become economically viable and realise its full potential if it took maximum advantage of opportunities to develop its business profitably in both the scheduled and non-scheduled markets. Practically, this entailed increasing frequencies on existing scheduled services with particular emphasis on South American and UK domestic trunk routes, starting up scheduled routes to new destinations, (Note: including in West Africa) securing a bigger share of the fast-growing short-/medium-haul IT market, establishing a presence in the long-haul closed group charter business (Note: including the opening of an office in New York) and doing more contract work for overseas airlines. (Note: primarily on a wet-lease basis)

These organisational changes led to a series of strikes. Despite its troubled industrial relations, BUA's financial performance gradually improved and it became profitable again. The improved financial performance was reflected in BUA's ability to turn BOAC's annual £1¼ million loss on the South American routes into a profit by the end of its fourth year of operation and to run the UK's only genuinely profitable domestic scheduled services.

In 1969, BUA purchased the VC10 prototype from Laker Airways. (Note: Laker Airways had acquired this aircraft in February 1968 from the manufacturer following its conversion into an 1109 series passenger aircraft; Laker immediately leased out the aircraft to Middle East Airlines (MEA) before selling it to BUA, with handover occurring at the end of the MEA lease on 1 April 1969) The acquisition of the VC10 prototype increased BUA's long-haul fleet to four aircraft.

By the end of the decade, BUA voluntarily withdrew from its two-year MoD contract for trooping flights between Britain and Germany, marking the end of the airline's trooping activities. (Note: the contract was taken over by Britannia Airways) By that time, BUA's fleet consisted of 21 aircraft, 18 of which were state-of-the art jet aircraft (four VC10s and 14 One-Elevens) as well as three Viscount 800 turboprops. Scheduled services accounted for 42% of its business, IT charters for 56% and trooping flights for the remaining 2%.

At the beginning of the new decade, BUA had an all-jet fleet, which gave it a competitive edge over its contemporary independent rivals.

=== "Second Force" ===
In the late 1960s, a parliamentary committee of inquiry headed by Sir Ronald Edwards, at the time the chairman of the Electricity Council and Professor at the London School of Economics, inquired into the UK's air transport industry and its prospects in the coming decade. At the conclusion of its inquiry, the Edwards committee published a 394-page report on 2 May 1969 entitled British Air Transport in the Seventies.

==== Concept ====
One of the Edwards report's recommendations was the creation of a financially and managerially sound, so-called Second Force private sector airline to operate a viable network of short- and long-haul scheduled and non-scheduled services. This "Second Force" airline was to be licensed to complement or compete with state-owned BEA and BOAC on selected short-/long-haul routes, in accordance with the relevant bilateral air transport agreements. Wherever bilateral agreements permitted a second British carrier, the "Second Force" was to assume this role. The "Second Force" was to be assisted in attaining critical mass by way of a limited route transfer from the corporations, both of which accounted for more than 90% of all UK scheduled air transport capacity in the late 1960s. In return, the "National Air Holdings Board" that was to assume control of the corporations was to be given a minority stake in the "Second Force" and at least one seat on its board. To enable the "Second Force" to become viable by 1980, its minimum size was to be at least 4 billion long-haul scheduled service seat miles (6.4 billion seat kilometres) per annum by 1975, and its fleet was to consist of at least 14 state-of-the-art long-haul aircraft, including three supersonic transports (SSTs), three wide-bodied trijets and eight conventional narrow-bodied jets.

The Edwards committee considered BUA and Caledonian the two main constituents of the envisaged "Second Force" among Britain's numerous contemporary independent airlines.

==== Creation ====
Following publication of the Edwards report, BUA pitched for the role of the "Second Force" airline. Its bid centred on a six-year expansion plan for the period 1970–1975 that envisaged the progressive transfer of all of BOAC's African routes to itself to complement its existing African services from Gatwick, and unlimited frequencies between Gatwick and New York's John F. Kennedy Airport. This route transfer was to be accomplished by 1975; the East African routes in 1971, to be followed by Central, West and South African routes in 1972, 73 and 75 respectively while widebodied services to New York were to begin in 1974 by which time BUA expected to be able to launch commercially viable transatlantic scheduled services with Lockheed L-1011 Tristars, McDonnell-Douglas DC-10s or an aircraft based on a late-1960s "sub-jumbo" design proposal Boeing had jointly developed with Aeritalia under the working title "Boeing 767". The plan also hinted at a subsequent transfer of the corporation's Caribbean and South American routes to strengthen BUA's role as the new British North-South long-haul airline while leaving BOAC to concentrate on becoming the UK's east–west long-haul carrier. BUA reckoned that this would give it the critical mass and rational route network to meet the Edwards' committee estimate of 4 billion annual scheduled long-haul seat miles (6.4 billion seat kilometres) that would be minimum for economically viable Second Force.

BUA estimated that it needed to invest £60 million in new aircraft, including the then latest generation widebody and supersonic aircraft, and £25 million for the associated ground facilities and working capital.

BUA's advocacy of large-scale route transfers from the corporations had not been envisaged by the committee and was opposed by the corporations and trade unions. It was also opposed by Caledonian; rather than creating spheres of influence between the corporations and the independents, that airline advocated organic development through new licensing opportunities that would permit it to compete with the corporations on an equal footing, especially on North Atlantic routes, and security of tenure upon which to build a sound economic future.

Meanwhile, BUA became a growing burden on the Cayzers as a result of its disappointing financial performance, a situation made worse by the unexpected loss of one of its most important IT customers to the newly formed BEA Airtours. This led to an approach to both corporations, with the intention of selling BUA to one of them. BEA, which was approached first, refused because it considered the price Sir Nicholas was asking for BUA — £9 million – too high. A subsequent approach to BOAC proved to be more successful. Sir Keith Granville, BOAC's then MD, agreed to purchase BUA from B&C for £7.9 million. Roy Mason, the President of the Board of Trade, gave the Government's preliminary approval to BOAC's proposed takeover of BUA, on the understanding that there were no realistic prospects of a merger with another independent airline as recommended in the Edwards report.

When the details of this supposedly confidential agreement were leaked to the press, Caledonian, which had expressed its interest in acquiring BUA itself and had already begun negotiations with BUA's senior management to make an offer to take over the airline, immediately applied to the ATLB for the revocation of all of BUA's scheduled route licences, requesting them to be transferred to itself. It also leaked its own version of this story to The Observer. Following this revelation, Roy Mason made a statement to the House of Commons that B&C had misled him about the prospects of forming a "Second Force" airline through a merger with another independent, and that he was therefore going to withhold his final approval of the BOAC-BUA merger "until the situation has been clarified". This opened the way for several parties – including Caledonian – to make a counter bid for BUA. As well as BOAC and Caledonian, Laker Airways and a consortium led by Alan Bristow expressed interest by the end of April. Bidders were required to withdraw any application for BUA routes and undertake not to make any such application for a year.

The new Conservative government endorsed the principle of the second force but contrary to its predecessor was prepared to transfer up to 3% of state route revenue to independents.

On 30 November 1970, Caledonian Airways acquired BUA together with three new BAC One-Eleven 500 series aircraft the latter had leased from B&C for £12 million, thereby enabling it to transform itself into a scheduled airline. The merged entity would be known for an interim period as Caledonian/BUA before eventually adopting the British Caledonian name.

== Fleet ==
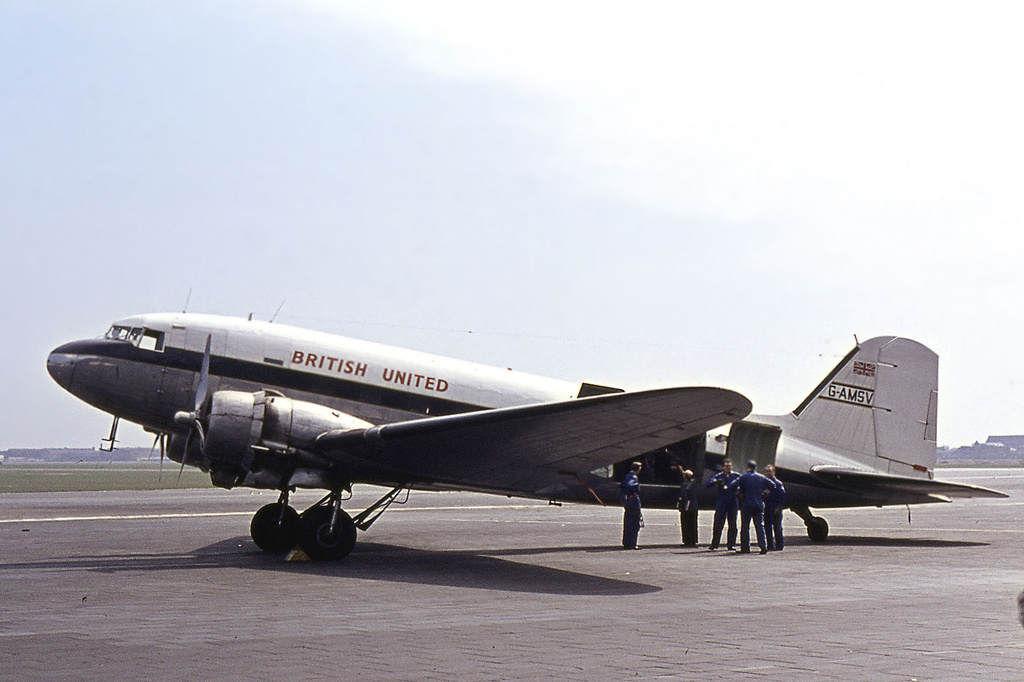
BUA Douglas C-47B G-AMSV in the airline's original livery, seen at Berlin Tempelhof in April 1964.

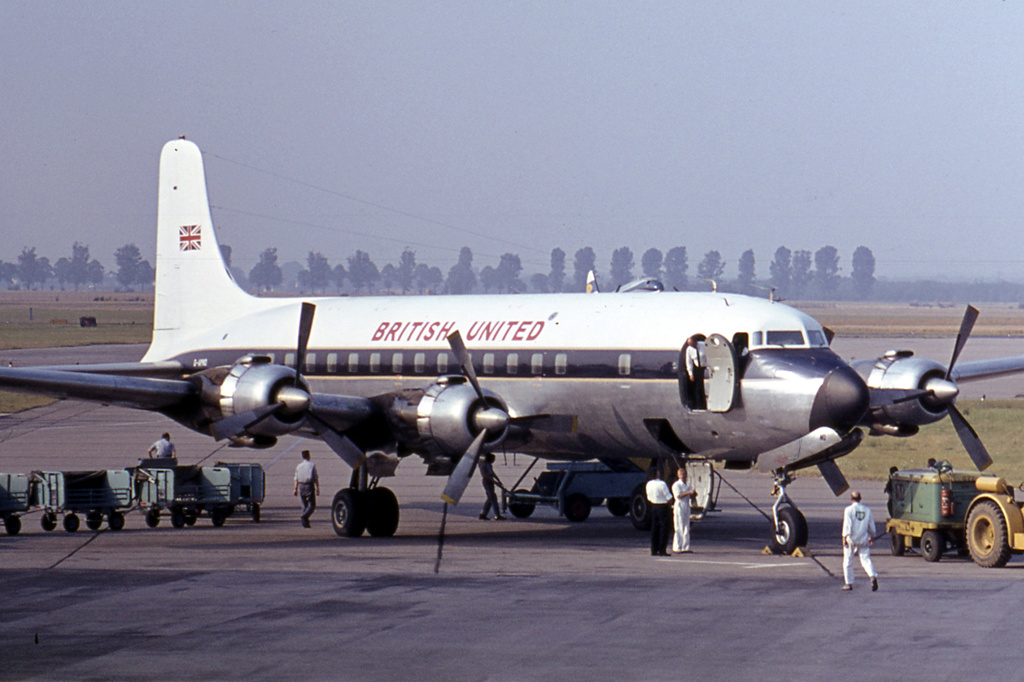
BUA Douglas DC-6C G-APNO in the airline's original livery, at Düsseldorf Lohausen in July 1964.

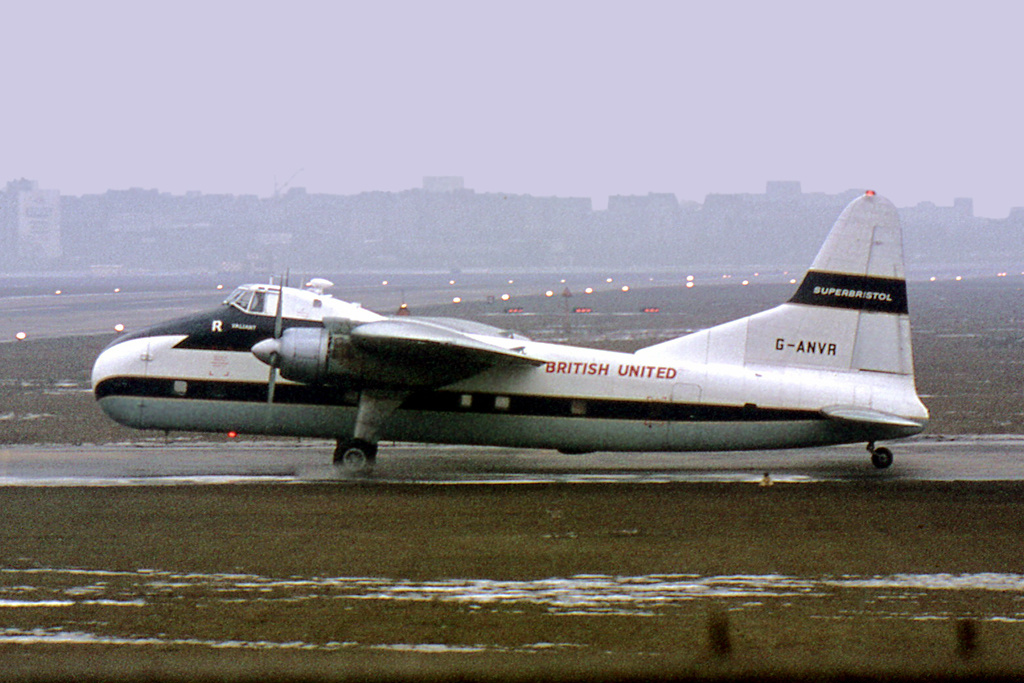
BUA Bristol 170 Freighter Mk 32 G-AOXU in the airline's original livery, taxiing at Berlin Tempelhof in January 1966.

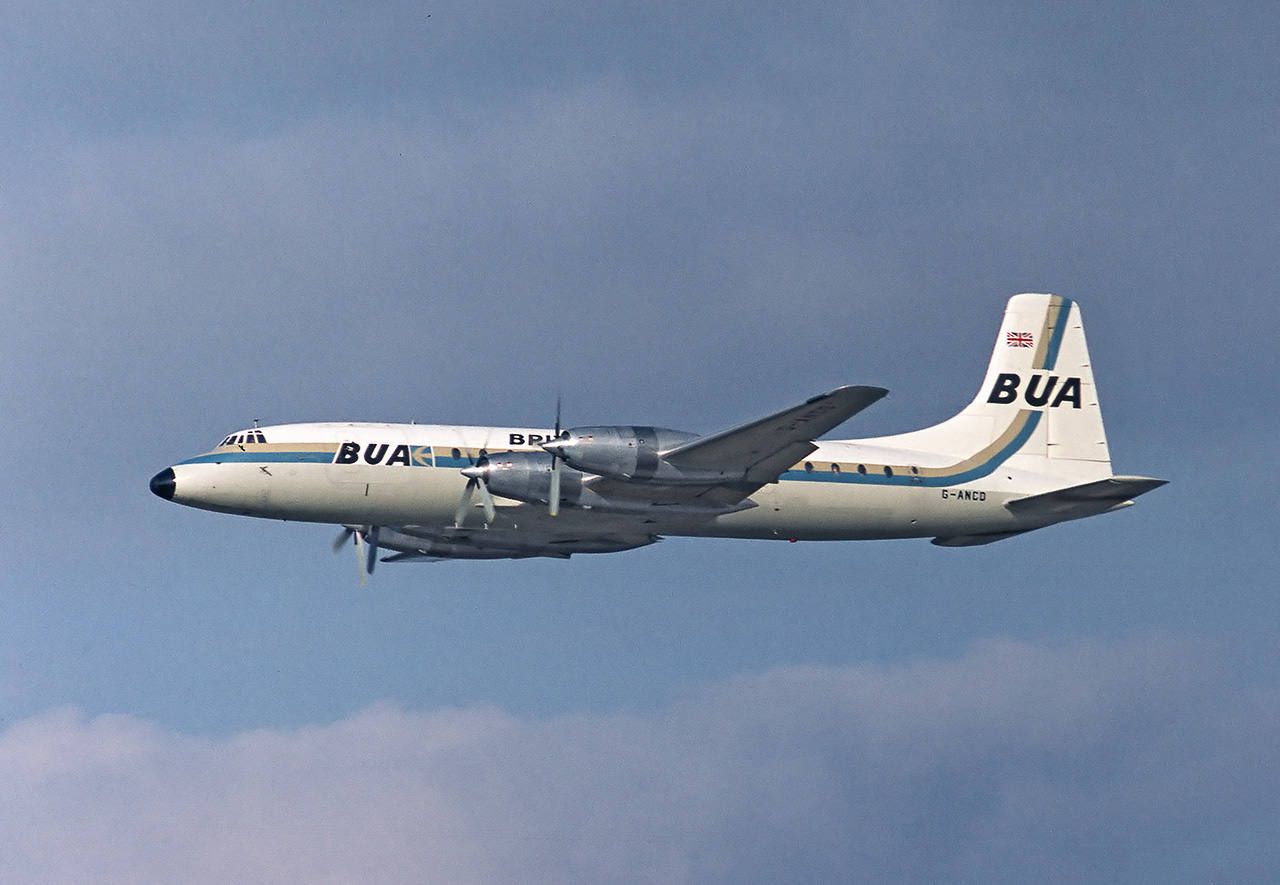
BUA Bristol 175 Britannia 307 G-ANCD in the airline's second and final livery, April 1967.

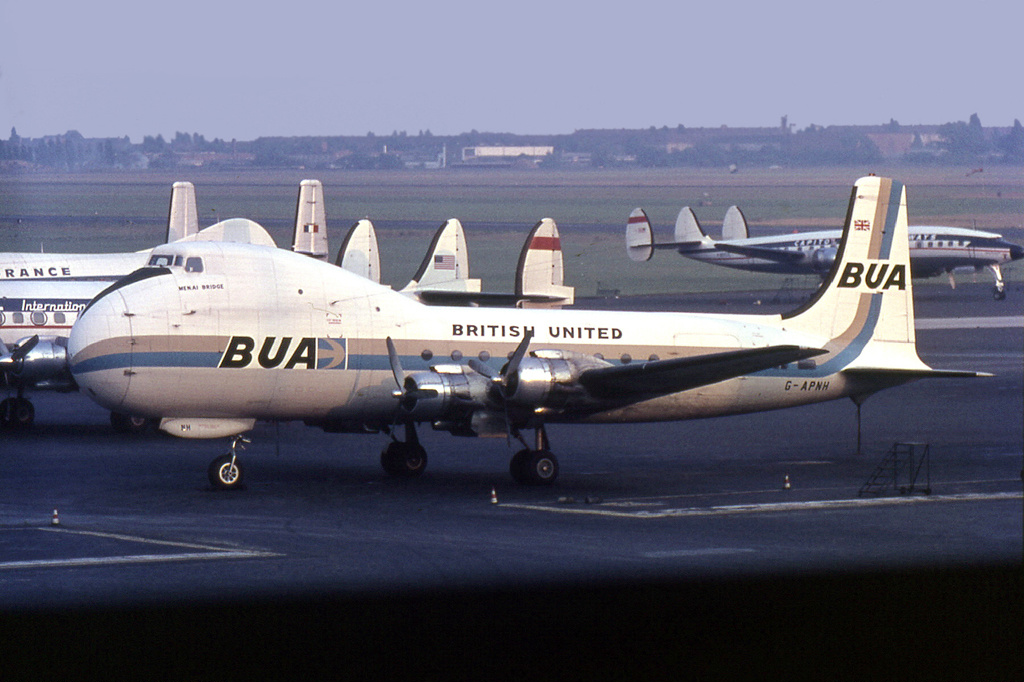
BUA ATL-98 Carvair G-APNH wearing the airline's second and final livery, at Berlin Tempelhof in August 1967.

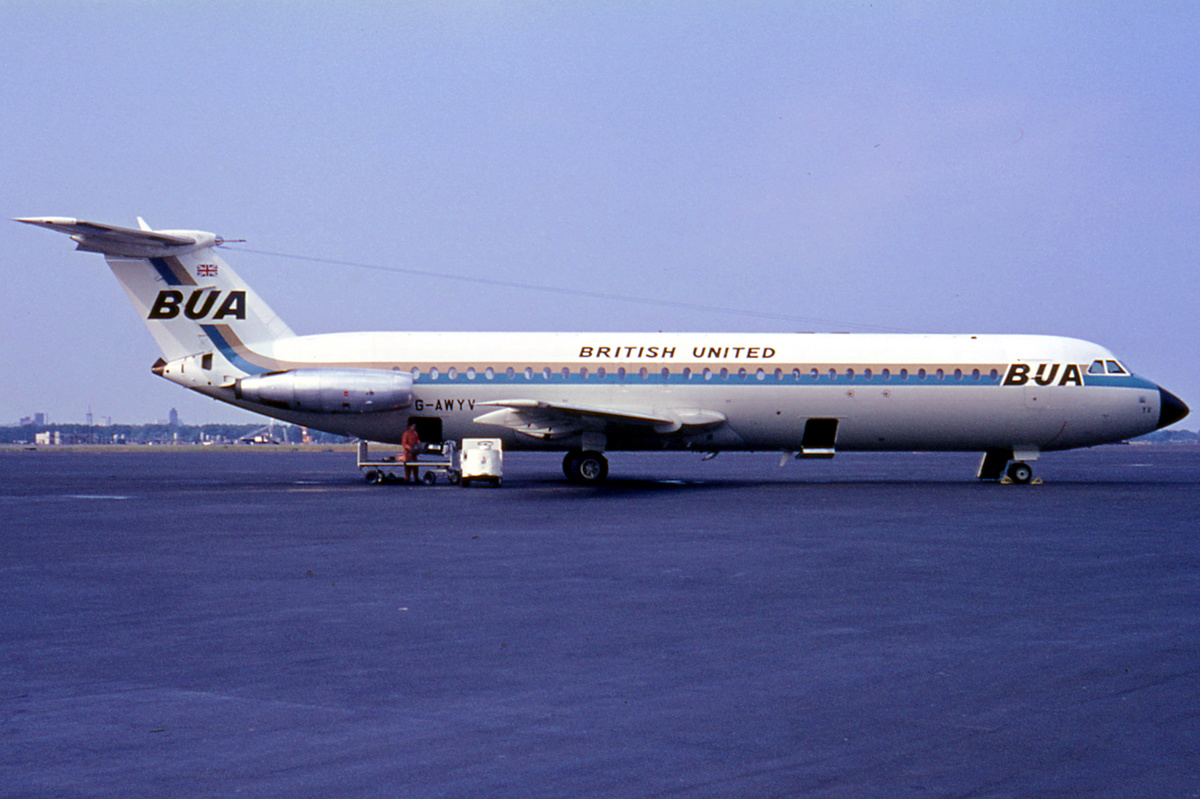
BUA BAC One-Eleven 501EX G-AWYV in the airline's second and final livery, at Berlin Tegel in July 1970.

BUA and its associates operated the following aircraft types during BUA's ten-year history:

- Aviation Traders Carvair
- BAC One-Eleven 200/400/500 series
- Beechcraft Twin Bonanza
- Bristol Freighter Mark 31
- Bristol Superfreighter Mark 32
- Bristol Britannia 300 series
- Cessna 310
- Cessna 320A Skyknight
- de Havilland Dragon Rapide
- de Havilland Dove
- de Havilland Heron
- de Havilland Canada DHC-2 Beaver
- Douglas DC-3 Dakota/Douglas C-47 Skytrain
- Douglas DC-4/Douglas C-54 Skymaster
- Douglas DC-6
- Handley Page HPR 7 Dart Herald
- Scottish Aviation Twin Pioneer
- Vickers VC10 series 1103/1109
- Vickers Viscount 700/800 series

In addition to the fixed-wing aircraft types listed above, BUA group companies also operated various helicopter types.

=== Fleet in 1961 ===
In April 1961, the combined fleet of all BUA group companies comprised 109 aircraft, 57 of which were fixed-wing aircraft. Various helicopter types accounted for the balance.

BUA air transport division fleet in 1961
Aircraft	Number
Bristol Britannia 300	4
Bristol Freighter	14
Cessna 310	1
Douglas DC-3	6
Douglas DC-4	5
Douglas DC-6A	2
de Havilland Dove	6
de Havilland Dragon Rapide	1
de Havilland Heron	2
Vickers Viscount	11
Total	52

BUA helicopter division fleet in 1961
Aircraft	Number
Westland Whirlwind	15
Westland Widgeon	4
other helicopters	33
Scottish Aviation Twin Pioneer	2
de Havilland Canada DHC-2 Beaver	1
Beechcraft Twin Bonanza	2
Total	57

=== Fleet in 1965 ===
In April 1965, the BUA mainline fleet comprised 21 aircraft (2 jets, 16 turboprops, 3 piston airliners).

BUA mainline fleet in April 1965
Aircraft	Number
Bristol Britannia 300	5
Cessna 320A Skyknight	1
Douglas DC-6A	2
Handley Page Dart Herald 204	1
Vickers VC10 1103	2
Vickers Viscount 700	4
Vickers Viscount 800	6
Total	21

The first of ten new BAC One-Eleven 201ACs that were on order was handed over to the airline on 4 April 1965.

BUA (mainline) employed 2,000 people at this time.

=== Fleet in 1969 ===
In April 1969, the BUA mainline fleet comprised 16 aircraft (13 jets and 3 turboprops).

BUA mainline fleet in April 1969
Aircraft	Number
BAC One-Eleven 201AC	9
Vickers VC10 1103/1109	4
Vickers Viscount 800	3
Total	16

The first of 8 new BAC One-Eleven 500s that were on order was handed over to the airline later that year.

BUA (mainline) employed 3,200 people at this time.

== Accidents and incidents ==
During its ten-year existence, BUA suffered one fatal accident and two non-fatal incidents.

The fatal accident was the crash of Flight 1030X on 14 April 1965. BUA (Channel Islands) Douglas C-47B-20-DK (registration: G-ANTB) was operating a scheduled international passenger flight from Paris Orly to Jersey. Despite the deteriorating weather conditions at Jersey's States Airport, the crew decided to continue its approach to runway 27. This approach was abandoned because runway visual range fell below minima. When the aircraft made a second approach, it struck the outermost pole of the approach light system at a height of 58 ft (18 m), 3,000 ft (910 m) short of the runway threshold. This caused the aircraft to crash into the approach lights and catch fire, which killed 26 of the 27 occupants (three out of four crew members and all 23 passengers).

The first non-fatal incident was on 30 October 1961. It involved a BUA mainline Vickers Viscount 736 (registration: G-AODH operating an internal German charter flight under contract to BEA from Berlin Tempelhof Airport to Frankfurt Rhein-Main Airport. While executing a missed approach during an instrument approach to Rhein-Main Airport in poor visibility, the aircraft crash-landed. It struck the ground alongside Rhein-Main's runway 25 and rolled to a stop. There aircraft was damaged beyond repair, but there were no fatalities among the 16 occupants (four crew and 12 passengers) although a flight attendant and a passenger sustained injuries. Accident investigators concluded that the crash-landing was caused by the captain flying below the critical height in inadequate surface visibility. They furthermore concluded that the assistance the captain received from his co-pilot at the critical moment was erroneous and misleading, and therefore constituted an important contributing factor.

The second non-fatal incident occurred on 14 January 1969. It involved a BUA mainline BAC One-Eleven 201AC (registration: G-ASJJ) operating a scheduled international passenger flight from Milan's Linate Airport to London Gatwick. This was the same aircraft BUA had used to operate the One-Eleven's inaugural revenue service. On the day of the accident, the aircraft had been diverted to Linate on the outbound flight because of fog at Genoa's Cristoforo Colombo Airport. A normal take-off run was followed by a bang immediately after the aircraft had become airborne. The captain in the jumpseat who was supervising the co-pilot at the time thought that there was a problem with the no. 1 engine. He advised the pilot in command to close the throttle a short while later. The pilot in command followed this advice and lowered the nose pitch from 12 to six degrees. The engine shutdown was accompanied by a decrease in airspeed from 140 to 115 kn (161 to 132 mph; 259 to 213 km/h). Although the aircraft was damaged beyond repair in the resulting forced landing on snow-covered sand about two miles from the end of runway 18, there were no fatalities among the 33 occupants (seven crew and 26 passengers) though there were two serious injuries. The accident investigators concluded that this crash was caused by the crew failing to recognise their mistake, which had resulted in shutting down the wrong engine (no. 1) in error following a compressor bang/surge in the no. 2 engine. In addition, the crew did not notice that an inadvertent movement of the relevant throttle lever had partially reduced the no. 2 engine's thrust.

== See also ==
- List of defunct airlines of the United Kingdom

== Notes and citations ==
Notes

Citations
