= Timeline of Gatwick Airport =

Gatwick Airport was in Surrey until 1974, when it became part of West Sussex as a result of a county boundary change. The original, pre-World War II airport was built on the site of a manor in the parish of Charlwood. The land was first used as an aerodrome in the 1920s, and in 1933 commercial flights there were approved by the Air Ministry.

== Origins ==
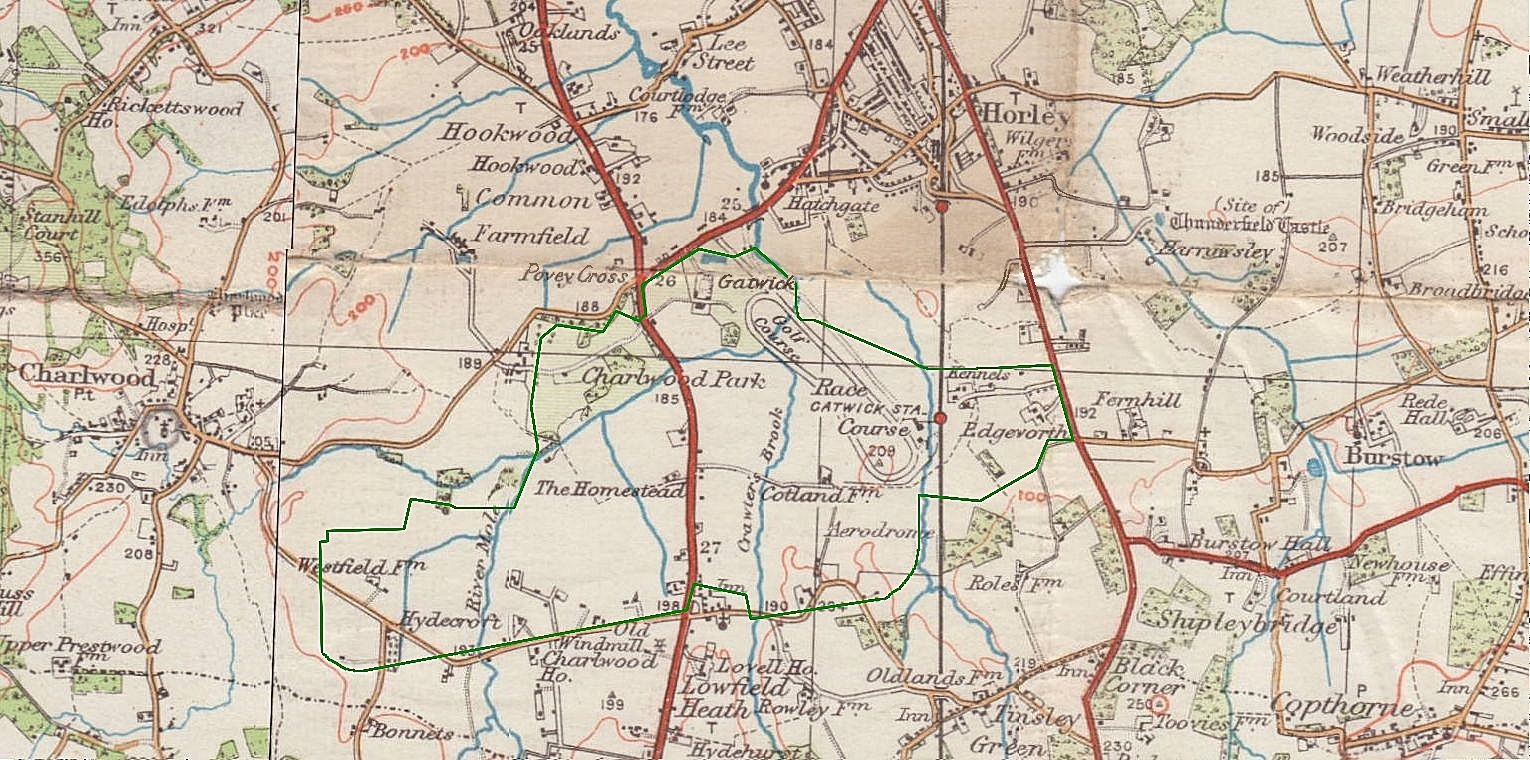
Gatwick Airport area in about 1925, with airport boundary in green. Gatwick Manor is at the northwest end of the racecourse. The modern runway runs roughly from the racecourse to the lane junction at Hydefield Farm, southeast of Charlwood.

- 1241: First record of the name "Gatwick" (as "Gatwik"). Gatwick was a manor in the parish of Charlwood, a village in Surrey. Gatwick manor house (not the same as the present Gatwick Manor Hotel) was on the site of today's airport, on the northern edge of the North Terminal's aircraft taxiing area; until the 19th century, it was owned by the De Gatwick family. Its name derives from the Old English gāt (goat) and wīc (dairy farm); i.e. "goat farm".
- 12 July 1841: The London and Brighton Railway opened, and ran near Gatwick Manor.
- 1890: The descendants of the original owners sold the area to the newly established Gatwick Race Course Company.
- 1891: The new owners opened a racecourse adjacent to the London-Brighton railway, to replace a racecourse in Croydon, and a dedicated station included sidings for horse boxes, and named Gatwick Racecourse Station. The course hosted steeplechases and flat races. During its time as a racecourse, many days were cancelled due to fog, fog would later continue to cause problems for the airport including the fatal crash involving Turkish Prime Minister's plane in 1959.
- 1907: Gatwick Golf Club was founded.
- 1916, 1917, 1918: The Grand National was run at Gatwick during the First World War. The Gatwick Golf Club disappeared following the end of the First World War.

== 1920–1945 ==
- Late 1920s: Land adjacent to the racecourse (at Hunts Green Farm, along Tinsley Green Lane) was used as an aerodrome. The Hunts Green farmhouse on the land used for the aerodrome was converted into a clubhouse and terminal.
- November 1928: From then, Dominion Aircraft Limited based its Avro 504 G-AACX at Gatwick.
- 1 August 1930: Ronald Waters, manager of Home Counties Aircraft Service (based at Penshurst Airfield in Kent), who had come into possession of Gatwick Aerodrome, got a licence for it. He founded the Surrey Aero Club there.
- 2–3 August 1930: Flying began with pleasure flights for the local population in Avro 504s of Waters's Surrey Aero Club.
- 1932: The Redwing Aircraft Company bought the aerodrome, and operated a flying school; it was also used for pilots flying in for races.
- 1933: The Air Ministry approved commercial flights from Gatwick.
- September 1933: A. M. (Morris) Jackaman, who owned several light aircraft, bought the aerodrome for £13,500. He had bold ideas for its future, such as expanding it to make it suitable to use as a relief aerodrome for London (Croydon) Airport and providing a regular service to Paris using de Havilland DH.84 Dragon aircraft. He overcame resistance from the Air Ministry, which was concerned about the cost of draining the clayey land and diverting the River Mole.
- 1934: Jackaman oversaw Gatwick's transition to a public aerodrome, licensed for non-private flights, and planned a proper terminal building linked to a new railway station on the adjacent Brighton Main Line. He formed a new airport company, Airports Limited. Hillman's Airways became Gatwick's first commercial airline operator, beginning scheduled services from the airport to Belfast and Paris.
- January 1935: Hillman's Airways moved to Gatwick from Stapleford Aerodrome.
- 1935: A new airline, Allied British Airways, was formed with the merger of Hillman's Airways, United Airways and Spartan Air Lines. The new carrier, which later shortened its name to British Airways, became Gatwick's principal operator. Dorking and Horley Rural District Council was concerned about possible compensation claims from local residents and the threat of facing liability for flying accidents, and it "could see no benefit" to allowing further development of the aerodrome.

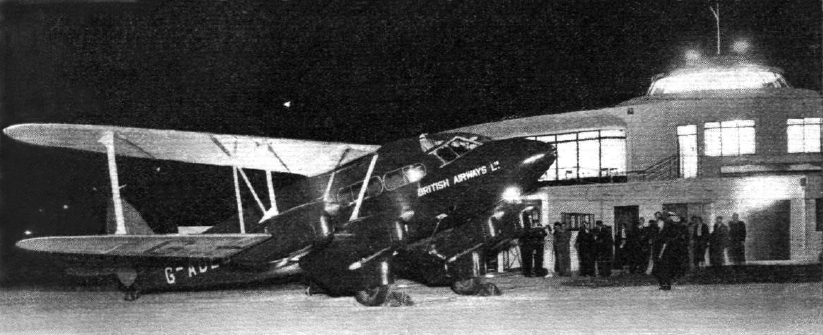
British Airways Ltd. DH.86 at the Beehive terminal building in 1936

- 6 July 1935: The aerodrome closed temporarily for renovations, which included building the "Beehive", the world's first circular terminal building.
- September 1935: Tinsley Green station opened on time, served by two trains per hour on the Victoria-Brighton line.
- 30 September 1935: Tinsley Green station opened 0.85 mi (1.37 km) south of the present Gatwick station.
- October 1935: The contracted opening date, but it was not met, partly because of drainage problems.
- 17 May 1936: The first scheduled flight departed from the Beehive terminal at 1:30 pm, bound for Paris Le Bourget. Jersey Airways operated this flight with a DH.86 under contract to British Airways Ltd., whose livery the aircraft wore. The airfare was £4 5s (including a first-class rail ticket from London Victoria Station), and there were up to three flights a day. Later the same day, British Airways Ltd. introduced another new scheduled service from Gatwick to Malmö, which routed via Amsterdam, Hamburg and Copenhagen. Total travelling time between Gatwick and Malmö was six-and-a-half hours.
- 25 May 1936: British Airways Ltd. and Southern Railway jointly launched scheduled air services between Gatwick and the Isle of Wight.
- 1 June 1936: Tinsley Green station was renamed "Gatwick Airport".
- 6 June 1936: The airport was officially reopened by the Secretary of State for Air, Lord Swinton. It featured four grass landing strips which were linked to the terminal area by two concrete taxiways, one each for arriving and departing aircraft respectively. The Beehive, the new terminal, was officially opened the same day. The Beehive was designed by Frank Hoar and incorporated several novel features, including a subway to the railway station at Tinsley Green which allowed passengers to travel from Victoria Station to the aircraft without stepping outside (with a transfer time from train to plane of as little as 20 minutes). Air Travel Ltd (a company specialising in aircraft and engine overhauls which had relocated to Gatwick from Penshurst) moved into the new airport's No. 1 hangar.
- July 1936: British Airways Ltd. inaugurated regular night mail flights linking Gatwick with Cologne and Hanover.
- September and November 1936: Two fatal accidents happened, raising questions about the airport's safety. The area was foggy, and its clay soil drained poorly; this caused the new subway to flood after rain.
- 17 February 1937: Gatwick was declared unserviceable due to waterlogging following repeated, heavy rainfalls. Because of this tendency to flood, and because longer landing strips were needed, the pre-war British Airways moved to Croydon Airport. Gatwick returned to private flying, and was used as a Royal Air Force (RAF) flying school.
- October 1937: The No. 19 Elementary and Reserve Flying Training School RAF (E&RFTS) began instructing future RAF pilots at Gatwick on de Havilland Tiger Moth and Hawker Hart biplanes.
- 1938: Airwork General Trading Co. moved into the hangar British Airways Ltd. had occupied at Gatwick. This enabled Heston-based Airwork to expand its aircraft manufacturing capacity on behalf of the Civilian Repair Organisation (CRO), which had awarded it a contract to modify Whitley bombers for the RAF. Southern Aircraft (Gatwick) Ltd. was another company working under contract to the CRO at Gatwick at the time. It had been licensed to assemble Stinson Reliants and Beechcraft Expeditors for the Royal Navy and also repaired damaged Beaufighters.
- 25 June 1938: The first Daily Express Air Display was held at Gatwick. Aircraft participating in the flypast included a Short Empire flying boat, a Lufthansa Focke-Wulf Condor, a Sabena Savoia-Marchetti SM.83, several RAF types and aerobatic aircraft.
- 1 September 1939: No. 19 E&RFTS ended its activities at Gatwick.
- 3 September 1939: Following the declaration of war on Germany, all civilian flying at Gatwick and elsewhere in the UK stopped. As a consequence, civil aircraft maintenance and manufacturing activities at the airport stopped as well. This resulted in the airport being requisitioned by the Air Ministry, and becoming a base for RAF night-fighters and an Army co-operation squadron during World War II (primarily for repairs and maintenance and as an alternative to RAF Kenley in the event that Kenley was rendered inoperable by enemy action).
- December 1939: The operations manager of British Airways Ltd., which had begun the process of merging with Imperial Airways to form British Overseas Airways Corporation (BOAC), inspected Gatwick to assess its suitability as a base for the combined operations of the merged airline.
- 1940: BOAC maintenance personnel began overhauling Armstrong Whitworth Ensigns and other aircraft types at Gatwick. Horse racing at Gatwick ended and never restarted.
- 1940 and 1941: RAF units relocated to Gatwick from France. The airport became closely associated with the RAF Army Cooperation Command. As a result, several Army Cooperation Command aircraft were stationed at Gatwick. These included Westland Lysanders, Curtiss Tomahawks and North American Mustangs.
- Late 1942: Gatwick began receiving RAF and USAAF bombers that were damaged or running short of fuel. The most common types were Avro Lancasters, Handley Page Halifaxes, Short Stirlings and Boeing B-17 Flying Fortresses.
- January 1945: Gatwick was taken over by the Supreme Headquarters Allied Expeditionary Force Disarmament Unit. As a result, it received a large number of transport and communications aircraft.

Royal Air Force Squadrons:

- No. 2 Squadron RAF
- No. 4 Squadron RAF
- No. 14 Squadron RAF
- No. 18 Squadron RAF
- No. 19 Squadron RAF
- No. 26 (South African) Squadron RAF
- No. 53 Squadron RAF
- No. 57 Squadron RAF
- No. 63 Squadron RAF
- No. 65 (East India) Squadron RAF
- No. 80 Squadron RAF
- No. 92 (East India) Squadron RAF
- No. 98 Squadron RAF
- No. 116 Squadron RAF
- No. 141 Squadron RAF
- No. 168 Squadron RAF
- No. 171 Squadron RAF
- No. 175 Squadron RAF
- No. 183 (Gold Coast) Squadron RAF
- No. 229 Squadron RAF
- No. 239 Squadron RAF
- No. 268 Squadron RAF
- No. 274 Squadron RAF
- No. 287 Squadron RAF
- No. 309 Polish Fighter-Reconnaissance Squadron
- No. 400 Squadron RCAF
- No. 414 Squadron RCAF
- No. 430 Squadron RCAF
- No. 613 (City of Manchester) Squadron AAF
- No. 655 Squadron RAF

Royal Air Force units:

- No. 1 Aircraft Delivery Flight RAF
- No. 1 Anti-Aircraft Calibration Flight RAF
- No. 1 Concealment and Decoy Unit
- No. 8 Anti-Aircraft Co-operation Unit RAF
- No. 13 Personnel Transit Centre
- No. 19 Elementary and Reserve Flying Training School RAF
- No. 74 (Bomber) Wing RAF
- No. 123 Airfield Headquarters RAF
- No. 129 Airfield Headquarters RAF
- No. 130 Airfield Headquarters RAF
- No. 162 Gliding School RAF
- No. 404 Air Stores Park
- No. 407 Air Ammunition Park
- No. 412 (Polish) Repair & Salvage Unit
- No. 1311 Mobile Wing RAF Regiment
- No. 1335 Wing RAF Regiment
- No. 1336 Wing RAF Regiment
- No. 1337 Wing RAF Regiment
- No. 1338 Wing RAF Regiment
- No. 2701 Squadron RAF Regiment
- No. 2702 Squadron RAF Regiment
- No. 2710 Squadron RAF Regiment
- No. 2736 Squadron RAF Regiment
- No. 2742 Squadron RAF Regiment
- No. 2749 Squadron RAF Regiment
- No. 2765 Squadron RAF Regiment
- No. 2773 Squadron RAF Regiment
- No. 2786 Squadron RAF Regiment
- No. 2792 Squadron RAF Regiment
- No. 2793 Squadron RAF Regiment
- No. 2798 Squadron RAF Regiment
- No. 2822 Squadron RAF Regiment
- No. 2880 Squadron RAF Regiment
- No. 2881 Squadron RAF Regiment
- No. 2883 Squadron RAF Regiment
- No. 2895 Squadron RAF Regiment
- Canadian Casualty Air Evacuation Unit
- Supreme Headquarters Allied Expeditionary Forces (RAF) Communication Squadron

== 1945–1958 ==
- 1946: The airport was officially decommissioned on 31 August, but the Ministry of Transport and Civil Aviation continued operating it as a civil airfield (initially for a six-month trial period). Airwork provided maintenance at Gatwick and other charter airlines, flying war-surplus aircraft, began using the airport despite its persistent drainage problem. Most commercial air services were cargo flights. Bond Air Services was one of the first cargo charter airlines to move to Gatwick; it began flying converted Halifax bombers from the airport.
- November 1946: Customs facilities began being provided at Gatwick.
- March 1947: Luton-based Hunting Air Transport established a base at Gatwick. It became the airport's first operator of post-World War II British-designed aircraft following delivery of a de Havilland Dove and two Vickers Vikings. (Hunting moved its base to Bovingdon soon after it had taken delivery of the Vikings.)
- January 1948: Airwork converted war-surplus Douglas Dakota aircraft for civil use at Gatwick, with work being carried out on up to 35 aircraft simultaneously. This included all British European Airways (BEA) aircraft, as well as many BOAC, Aer Lingus and KLM aircraft.
- 1948: The second Daily Express Air Display at Gatwick drew a crowd of 70,000. It included an RAF flypast and flying displays by a British South American Airways Avro Tudor and a KLM Douglas DC-6.
- November 1948: The airport's owners warned that it might revert to private use by November 1949; Stansted was favoured as London's second airport, and Gatwick's future was unclear.
- 1949: The third and final Daily Express Air Display was held at Gatwick.
- 1950: Despite local opposition, the Cabinet chose Gatwick as an alternative to Heathrow (then known as London Airport). BEA launched a seasonal scheduled service to Alderney in the Channel Islands, which operated for three consecutive summer seasons until 1952. At the time, there were three operational runways. These were aligned South-West–North-East, East–West and South-East–North-West. The first was 4,200 ft (1,300 m) long, 150 ft (46 m) wide and covered in steel mesh; the second was 3,600 ft (1,100 m) long, 150 ft (46 m) wide and covered in steel mesh as well; the third was of the same length and width as the second but was grass-covered.
- May 1950: Gatwick's first charter flight left the airport's original grass runway for Calvi on Corsica (with a refuelling stop in Nice). Jersey-based UK independent (Note: independent from government-owned corporations) airline Air Transport Charter operated this flight under contract to UK package tour pioneer Vladimir Raitz's Horizon Holidays with a 32-seat Douglas DC-3 carrying 11 passengers.
- September 1951: BEA's Experimental Helicopter Unit moved to Gatwick from Peterborough.

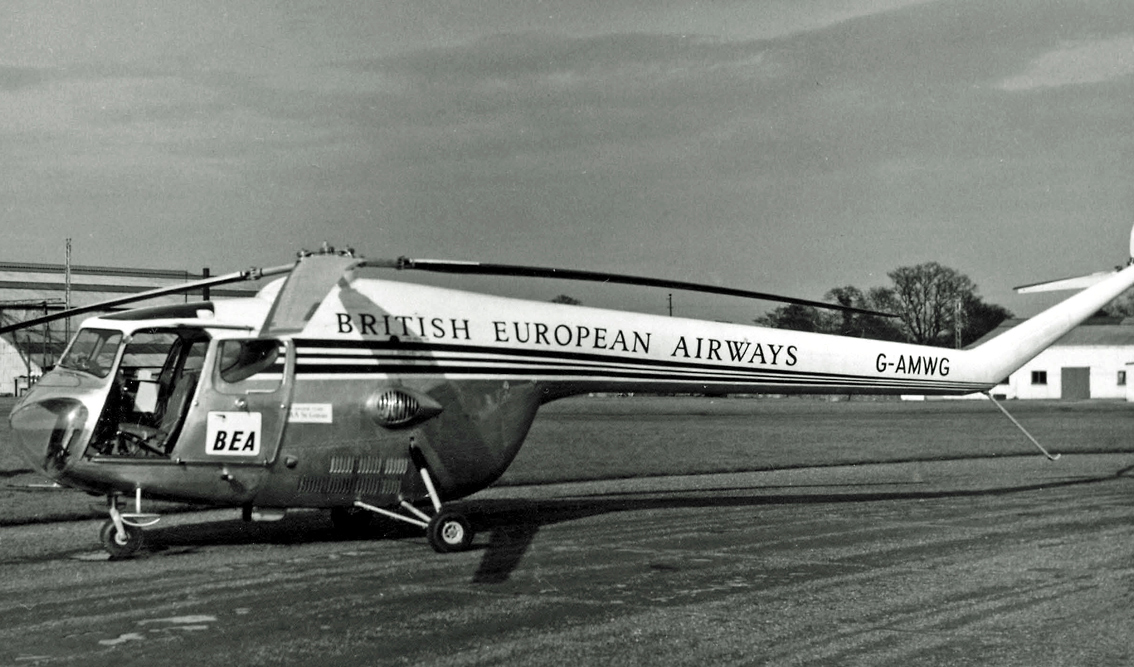
BEA Bristol Sycamore helicopter at its Gatwick base in 1955.

- 1952: BEA established a base at Gatwick for its helicopter operations. Silver City Airways introduced Gatwick's first car ferry flights. These were seasonal, operating in the summer twice a day between Gatwick and Le Touquet. They were flown with Bristol 170 Mk 31 Freighters, which were replaced with larger Mk 32 Superfreighters from April 1955.
- July 1952: The British government confirmed that the airport would be renovated to provide sufficient capacity for an expected doubling of aircraft movements in the London area by 1960 and for aircraft diverted from Heathrow in bad weather.
- 1953: Jersey Airlines began flying from Gatwick to Alderney. The airline's first scheduled service from the airport was flown with de Havilland DH.114 Heron aircraft.
- 17 January 1956: The Gatwick Airport Consultative Committee held its first meeting.
- 1956 to 1958: The airport was closed for the £7.8 million renovation; during that period, BEA continued using Gatwick for its helicopter operations. The renovations were performed by Alfred McAlpine; they entailed diverting the A23 London–Brighton trunk road and the River Mole, building a runway across the former racecourse and rebuilding the former racecourse railway station next to the new terminal. The new, 7,000 ft (2,100 m) concrete runway was the first in Britain to feature high-speed turn-offs on to a parallel taxiway. The masterplan for the new airport also provided for subsequent construction of second 7,000 ft (2,100 m) runway, as part of a second phase, northward extension of the airfield.

== 1958–1969 ==
- Late 1950s and after: A number of British contemporary private airlines relocated to Gatwick from rival airports that closed down, closed to commercial air traffic and/or could not accommodate modern aircraft, including large commercial jet aircraft such as the Boeing 707 and Douglas DC-8.
- 28 May 1958: The original Gatwick railway station (which had been rebuilt) reopened as Gatwick Airport station, and Tinsley Green station was closed.
- 30 May 1958: The first commercial air service to use the rebuilt airport was operated by Transair with a Vickers Viscount carrying troops from Malta; it landed at 3:45 pm. (The first scheduled air service to use the rebuilt airport was operated by Jersey Airlines with a de Havilland Heron.)
- May–June 1958: Transair became the first airline to establish a base at the new Gatwick.
- 9 June 1958: Official opening. Queen Elizabeth II flew into Gatwick in a de Havilland Heron of the Queen's Flight for the opening. The first "official" flight after the reopening ceremony was a BEA "Pionair" class DC-3 operating a charter for Surrey County Council to Jersey and Guernsey. Gatwick was the world's first airport with a direct railway link and the first to combine mainline rail, trunk road facilities and an air terminal building in one unit. It was also one of the first with an enclosed pier-based terminal, which allowed passengers to walk under cover to waiting areas near the aircraft (with only a short walk outdoors). At the time, this comprised a single pier (the central and main pier of what is now the South Terminal) with 11 aircraft stands. Another feature of Gatwick's new air terminal was its modular design, permitting subsequent, phased expansion.
- 1958 and 1959: Sudan Airways and BWIA West Indies Airways were among Gatwick's first scheduled overseas airlines. The former's "Blue Nile" service was the first scheduled flight from Gatwick by a foreign airline. (Note: launched on 8 June 1959) The service, between Khartoum and Gatwick via Cairo, Athens and Rome, initially used Airwork Viscount aircraft. US supplemental carriers Capitol International, Overseas National Airways (ONA), President Airlines, Seven Seas Airlines and Transocean Air Lines and several South European and Scandinavian charter airlines were among the airport's early overseas users. Among the transatlantic flights Gatwick received during that period were several Pan American aircraft that diverted from London Airport due to bad weather in the Heathrow area. This included the first appearance of a Boeing 707 at the airport.
- February 1959: Transair assumed the operation of the African "Safari" low-fare flights from owner Airwork, along with two dedicated Viscount aircraft. This resulted in the service's London terminal moving from Blackbushe to Gatwick. Airwork ended its manufacturing and large-scale, third party aircraft maintenance activities at Gatwick following completion of a large scheduled servicing and repair contract for RAF F-86 Sabre fighters stationed in West Germany, which employed 550 at its peak.
- Summer 1959: US supplementals Capitol International and ONA began a series of seasonal charter flights carrying American tourists to Europe, which transited Gatwick en route to their final destinations on the Continent.
- September 1959: Morton Air Services moved to Gatwick following Croydon Airport's closure.
- November 1959: Air Safaris moved to Gatwick from Southend Airport.
- 1960: Overseas Aviation moved to Gatwick from Southend Airport.
- 1 June 1960: Airwork, Dan-Air Services, Falcon Airways, Orion Airways and Pegasus Airlines moved to Gatwick following Blackbushe Airport's closure to commercial air traffic.
- 14 June 1960: The Parliamentary Secretary to the Ministry of Aviation, Geoffrey Rippon, opened the new, £300,000 Overseas Aviation hangar at Gatwick. At the time, this was the largest clear-span timber structure in the UK.
- 1 July 1960: Airwork (incorporating Gatwick-based Morton Air Services and Transair, Redhill-based Bristow Helicopters, and Southend-based Air Charter and Channel Air Bridge) merged with Hunting-Clan to form British United Airways (BUA). BUA assumed most of its predecessors' fixed-wing aircraft services, becoming Britain's biggest independent (and Gatwick's foremost resident) airline during the 1960s. By the end of the decade, it was the airport's leading scheduled operator, with a 44,100 mi (71,000 km) network of short-, medium- and long-haul routes across Europe, Africa and South America using contemporary BAC One-Eleven and Vickers VC10 jet aircraft. Despite the rapid expansion of BUA's (and other airlines') scheduled activities at Gatwick, the airport was dominated by non-scheduled services from the early 1960s until the end of the 1980s. Most were inclusive tour (IT) passenger services provided by a number of British independent operators and their overseas counterparts. This earned the airport its "bucket and spade" nickname.
- 1960 and 1961: Air Couriers built a new engineering base at Gatwick to provide aircraft maintenance services to third parties, including airlines and corporate aircraft owners. Flying Tiger Line, Riddle Airlines and Saturn Airways began operating regular summer charters carrying passengers and cargo between Gatwick, the US, the Republic of Ireland, Continental Europe and Asia. These services compensated for traffic lost as a result of the collapse of several of Gatwick's resident airlines during that period.

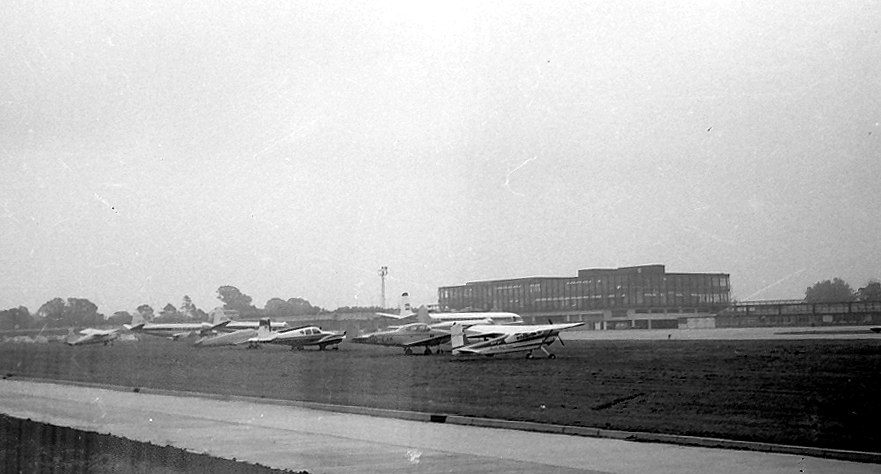
Gatwick in 1961

- 1961: BUA announced the construction of a new, £585,000 hangar and office complex at Gatwick.
- 1 April 1961: The airport's designation became "London (Gatwick)", emphasising its status as a London airport. (London Airport became "London (Heathrow)".) Following the agreement with the British government to transfer some flights from Heathrow to improve Gatwick's utilisation, BEA and Air France moved some of their flights to Paris (Le Bourget) to Gatwick. BEA also moved some flights to other European destinations to Gatwick.
- 29 November 1961: A Caledonian Airways Douglas DC-7C that was chartered by London Transport Executive landed at Gatwick with 95 immigrants from Barbados on board. This was the airline's first revenue flight.
- 1962: Two additional piers were added to the terminal.
- 1 May 1963: Non-scheduled operators began implementing the Ministry of Aviation's instruction to transfer all regular charter flights from Heathrow to Gatwick, restricting Heathrow's use for non-scheduled operations to "occasional" charter flights.
- 26 May 1963: BUA launched "Silver Arrow", a twice-daily combined rail-air service between London and Paris, with a Viscount for the cross-Channel Gatwick–Le Touquet air service.
- 29 June 1963: US President John F. Kennedy arrived at Gatwick, where he was met by UK Prime Minister Harold Macmillan.

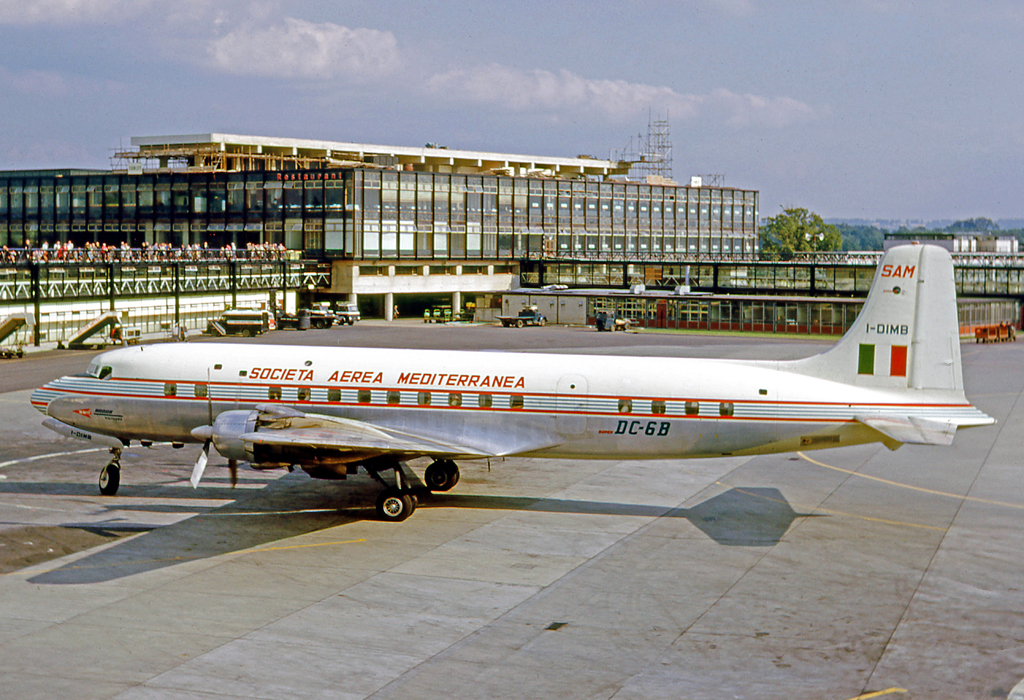
The main passenger terminal at Gatwick in 1964 taken from one of the two piers looking SE.

- 1 January 1964: BEA Helicopters made Gatwick their administrative and engineering base.
- 1964: Gatwick's original, relatively short late-1950s paved runway was extended by 1,200 ft (370 m) to 8,200 ft (2,500 m) due to new noise rules governing the operation of jet aircraft at airports near (or surrounded by) densely populated urban areas.
- 1965: By now, each of the three piers was nearly 1,000 ft (300 m) long, and the terminal complex had a floor area of 100,000 sq ft (9,300 m^{2}).
- 9 April 1965: a BUA One-Eleven operated the type's first commercial service from Gatwick to Genoa.
- 3 June 1965: BEA Hawker Siddeley Trident 1C G-ARPB became the first aircraft to fly an approach to Gatwick Airport automatically as part of a demonstration flight to journalists that included a total of nine fully automatic approaches to the airport.
- 4 January 1966: BUA began Gatwick's first scheduled domestic jet service to Glasgow, Edinburgh and Belfast. The new service, known as "InterJet", made BUA the first UK domestic airline using jet aircraft exclusively.
- 1966: Ariana Afghan Airlines, Kingdom of Libya Airlines and TAROM began regular scheduled services from Gatwick, and the newly formed Laker Airways established its base at the airport. Canadian charter airline Wardair launched the first of a series of transatlantic charter flights from Gatwick to Canada with Boeing 727s.
- 1 April 1966: The British Airports Authority (BAA) came into being; it assumed the management of Gatwick, Heathrow and Stansted. BAA's first chairman, Peter Masefield, unfurled the new BAA standard on Gatwick's central pier and opened the airport's new general aviation terminal (located north of the passenger terminal), before leaving for Heathrow with a group of officials and journalists aboard a Channel Airways Hawker Siddeley 748.
- Summer 1966 and after: Busy summer weekends featured frequent arrivals and departures throughout the night as there were no night flying restrictions at Gatwick at the time. These were mainly passenger charter flights to Mediterranean resorts, although some were cargo charters to the Channel Islands and special, seasonal low-fare scheduled services flown by Iberia, SAS and Swissair. As many airlines had begun phasing out their obsolete piston airliners, a growing number of these night flights were operated by first and second generation jet aircraft powered by noisy turbojet or low-bypass turbofan engines.
- 1966–67 fiscal year: (Note: 1 April 1966 to 31 March 1967) BAA began constructing a new, five-story office complex on top of the main terminal building.
- 1967: Gatwick's last car ferry flight flew, following British Air Ferries' decision to withdraw the service it inherited from Silver City Airways when it merged with Channel Air Bridge in 1963 to form British United Air Ferries.
- May 1967: Green Line Coaches launched an hourly inter-airport express coach service between Gatwick and Heathrow.
- 14 and 15 September 1968: Torrential rains associated with thunderstorms in the Gatwick area caused the River Mole to burst its banks. This resulted in the worst recorded flooding in the area for 100 years, which necessitated Gatwick Airport's complete closure for several hours.
- 12 November 1968: Pioneering Icelandic low-cost carrier Loftleiðir inaugurated Gatwick's first transatlantic scheduled passenger flight to New York's John F. Kennedy Airport via Reykjavík-Keflavík Airport.
- 25 June 1969: Westward Airways began the first inter-airport air shuttle between Gatwick and Heathrow using Britten-Norman Islanders. The airline's nine-seater aircraft plied this route six times a day each way. The flying time was 15 minutes (compared with an average surface travelling time of one-and-a-half hours). Fares charged were £4 one-way.

== 1970–1979 ==
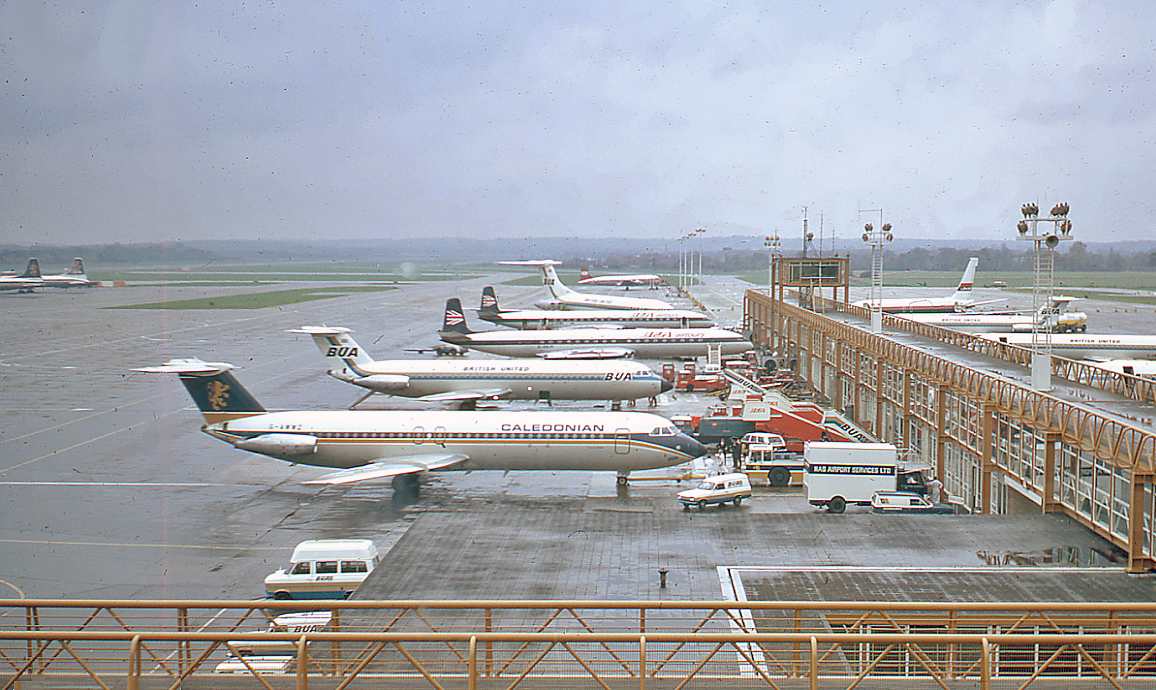
Airport apron in 1970

- 1970: A second 875-foot (267 m) extension of Gatwick's runway was completed, bringing it to 9,075 ft (2,766 m) and allowing non-stop jet flights to the US east coast with a full payload and full range and payload operations by British United Airways and Caledonian Airways BAC One-Eleven 500s. BEA Airtours made Gatwick their base.
- 6 March 1970: A BEA Airtours de Havilland Comet 4B performed the airline's first revenue flight from Gatwick to Palma de Mallorca.
- May 1970: BAA published a 10-year draft plan for Gatwick. This envisaged expanding the area covered by the airport by 840 acres (340 hectares) to 2,273 acres (920 hectares), including a second, 7,513 ft (2,290 m) long, parallel runway, 2,998 ft (914 m) to the north of the existing runway to enable processing of 20 million passengers per annum at the end of this period. The draft plan also made provisions for another terminal and considered the possibility of a third, short takeoff and landing (STOL) runway further north of the proposed second runway at a future date.
- 22 August 1970: Westward Airways discontinued its inter-airport air shuttle between Gatwick and Heathrow.
- November 1970: Caledonian Airways bought British United Airways, following which the combined airline began trading as Caledonian/BUA. The acquisition let Caledonian become a scheduled airline; in addition to the routes inherited from BUA, it began scheduled services to Europe, North and West Africa, North America and the Middle and Far East during the 1970s and 1980s.
- March 1971: Green Line extended its Gatwick–Heathrow inter-airport express coach service to Luton Airport.
- September 1971: Caledonian/BUA was renamed British Caledonian (BCal).
- 1 November 1971: BCal began the first scheduled service between London and Paris by a private UK airline since the 1930s, operating between Gatwick and Le Bourget.
- 9 October 1972: The arrival at Gatwick of a Wardair Boeing 707 on a positioning flight from Honolulu was thought to be the longest non-stop flight of a Boeing 707 at the time.
- November 1972: Laker Airways became the first operator of wide-body aircraft at Gatwick after the introduction of two McDonnell-Douglas DC-10-10 aircraft. Laker's DC-10 fleet expanded during the 1970s and early 1980s; this included longer-range -30s, introduced in 1980.
- 21 November 1972: A Laker Airways DC-10-10 performed the first revenue flight of a DC-10 in Europe carrying 331 charter passengers from Gatwick to Palma de Mallorca. At the time, this was also the highest number of passengers carried on a single aircraft from the airport.
- 1973: The third extension of Gatwick's runway was completed, bringing it to 10,165 ft (3,098 m) and allowing for non-stop narrow-body operations to the US west coast and commercially viable, long-range wide-body operations.

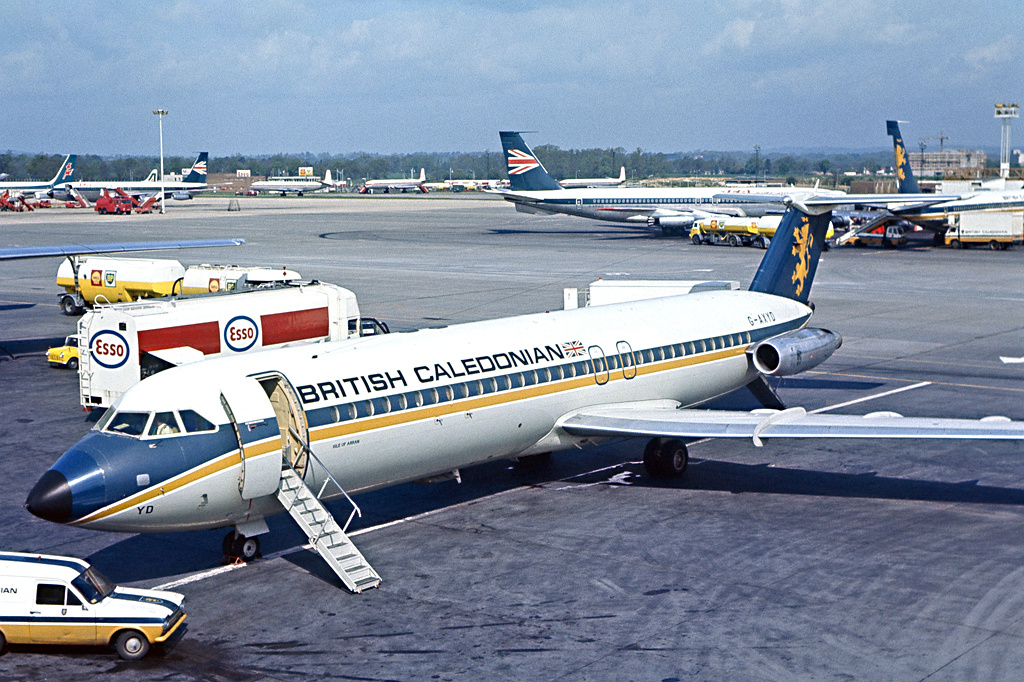
Apron in 1973

- April 1973: BCal began the first transatlantic scheduled service by a private UK airline to New York and Los Angeles from Gatwick.
- May 1973: KLM augmented its Heathrow–Amsterdam service with a Gatwick–Amsterdam route, making it the first non-UK airline to split operations between Heathrow and Gatwick for commercial reasons rather than to comply with government directives. Wardair and US supplemental World Airways became the first airlines to operate Boeing 747s at Gatwick.
- 1974: The borough of Crawley was extended northwards to include Gatwick Airport and its surrounding land. Gatwick Airport thus moved from Surrey into West Sussex.
- July 1974: BAA published a revised master plan for Gatwick to take account of lower demand for air travel than anticipated at the time of publication of the draft plan in May 1970, as a consequence of a fall in disposable incomes caused by the 1973 oil crisis. This resulted in abandoning the proposal for a second runway and in a downward revision of the number of passengers the airport was expected to handle in the early 1980s to 16 million.
- March and May 1977: BCal introduced its first two DC-10-30s (its first wide-body aircraft) at the airport.
- 26 September 1977: Laker Airways launched Skytrain, Gatwick's first daily long-haul, no-frills, non-stop flights to John F. Kennedy (JFK) Airport.
- Late 1970s: By now, government initiatives supporting Gatwick's development resulted in steady growth in passenger traffic. Among these were policies seeking to transfer all scheduled services between London and the Iberian Peninsula from Heathrow to Gatwick, banning whole-plane charters at Heathrow and requiring all airlines planning scheduled services to London for the first time to use Gatwick instead of Heathrow. This policy was known as the London [Air] Traffic Distribution Rules. The government also approved a high-frequency helicopter shuttle service linking Gatwick with Heathrow.

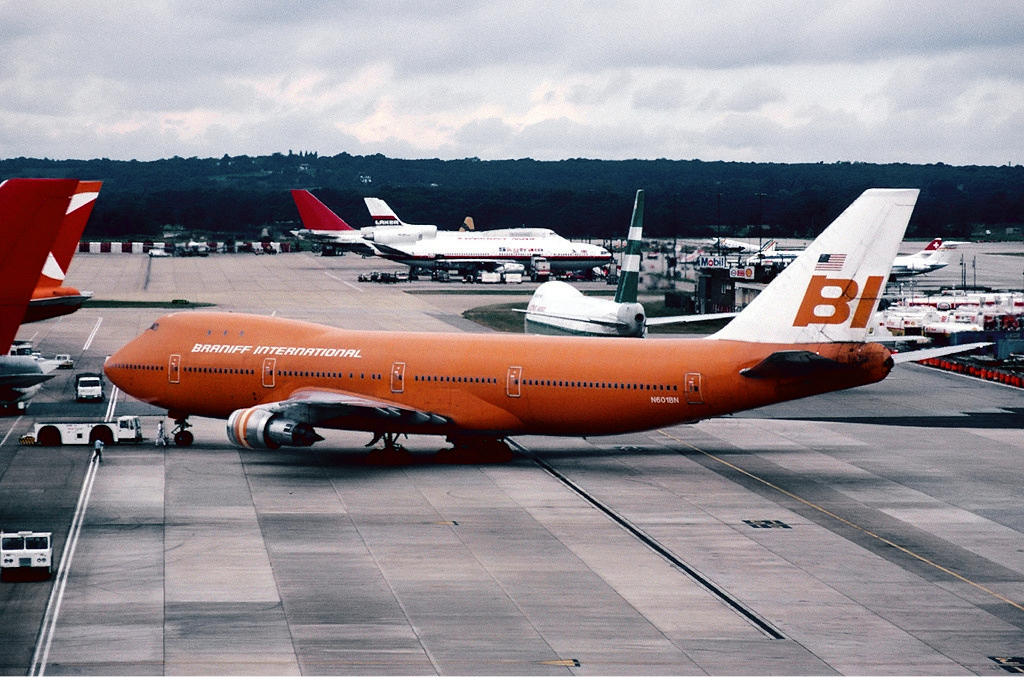
Braniff Boeing 747-127 N601BN. The aircraft was nicknamed "Big Orange" and flew into Gatwick from Dallas–Fort Worth between 1978 and 1982.

- 18 March 1978: The launch of scheduled flights from Gatwick to Dallas–Fort Worth by Braniff Airways marked the first occasion a US certificated route air carrier (Note: former holder of a Certificate of Public Convenience and Necessity issued by the now defunct US Civil Aeronautics Board authorising the operation of frequent, regular scheduled passenger and cargo services) flew to Gatwick rather than Heathrow, as a result of access restrictions to Heathrow implemented in the 1977 Bermuda II UK–US bilateral air transport agreement.
- 1 April 1978: The London [Air] Traffic Distribution Rules became effective, retroactive to 1 April 1977. The rules were designed to increase Gatwick's utilisation and improve its efficiency across the operating day, all-year round to help it become profitable. British Airways (BA) and Aer Lingus began daily scheduled flights between Gatwick and Dublin, the first use of Gatwick as a London terminal for scheduled services between the British and Irish capitals and the first BA scheduled service from Gatwick with aircraft based at the airport. (Note: using a BAC One-Eleven 500 operating once a day each way from Gatwick to Düsseldorf and Frankfurt respectively and six-times-a-week each way from Gatwick to Zürich, in addition to the daily Gatwick–Dublin return flight) For Aer Lingus, it was the first scheduled service from Gatwick.
- 9 June 1978: 20th anniversary of Gatwick's reopening by Queen Elizabeth II. BCal, British Airways Helicopters and BAA jointly introduced Airlink, a helicopter shuttle service operating 10 times daily to Heathrow.
- 31 December 1978: By now, scheduled flights exceeded charter flights for the first time since the early 1960s.
- 23 April 1979: The Gatwick–Heathrow Airlink carried its 50,000th passenger.
- August 1979: BAA signed a legally binding agreement with West Sussex County Council not to build another runway at Gatwick for 40 years in return for gaining approval to upgrade the taxiway running parallel to the airport's existing runway to an emergency landing strip.
- Late 1970s and early 1980s: Fully extendible jet bridges were added when the piers were rebuilt and extended.

== 1980–1989 ==
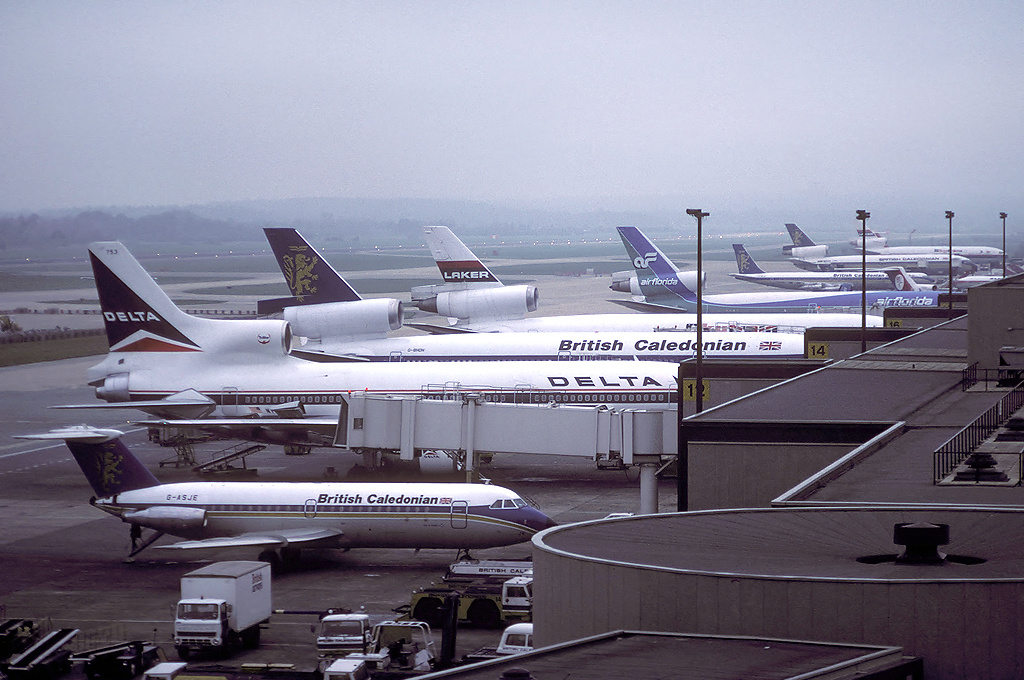
Apron in 1981 (note the prominence of wide-bodied aircraft)

- 1 August 1980: BCal launched the UK's first private scheduled air service to Hong Kong (via Dubai) from the airport.
- 9 November 1980: The departure from Gatwick of a Dan-Air Comet on a one-hour special charter flight for aircraft enthusiasts marked the last revenue service of the world's first commercial jet airliner.
- 1982: BCal began operating a small fleet of Boeing 747-200s from Gatwick. BAA and British Airways Helicopters ended their involvement in the Gatwick–Heathrow Airlink, leaving BCal to assume sole responsibility for this service. This included British Caledonian Helicopters supplying both the helicopter and engineering backup.
- 28 May 1982: Pope John Paul II arrived at Gatwick on an Alitalia Boeing 727-200 Advanced, beginning the first papal visit to the United Kingdom.
- 2 June 1982: The Pope left Gatwick at the end of his visit aboard a BCal Boeing 707.
- December 1982: The Gatwick Hilton opened as the first hotel in Britain to be part of an airport complex.
- 1983: As passenger numbers grew, a circular satellite pier was added to the terminal building connected to the main terminal by the UK's first automated people mover system. (This replaced the original North pier dating from 1962, and the people mover connecting the main terminal with the satellite pier was subsequently replaced with a walkway and travelators). A second terminal was planned, and construction began on the North Terminal on the land earmarked for a second runway in the draft plan of May 1970. This was the largest construction project south of London in the 1980s, costing £200 million.

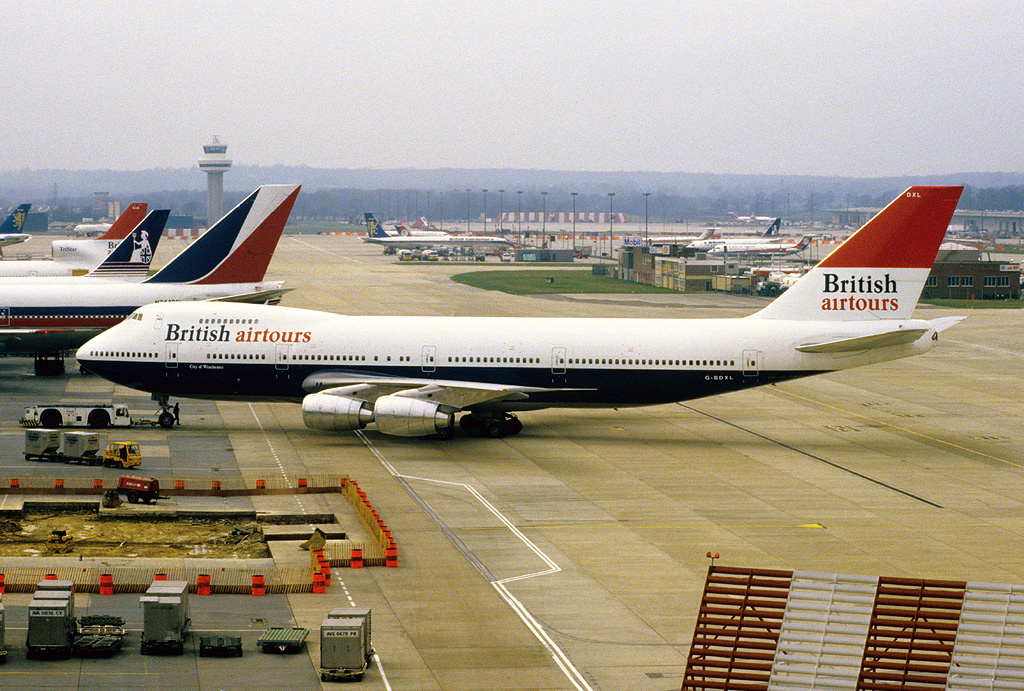
Gatwick in 1984, with the new control tower in background

- 1984: Gatwick's new air-traffic control tower opened, the tallest in the UK at the time. The Gatwick Express was launched by British Rail, the world's first non-stop airport-to-city-centre rail service (between the airport and Victoria Station).
- 22 June 1984: Virgin Atlantic's first commercial flight left Gatwick for Newark Liberty International Airport.
- 1985: Work began on converting the northern parallel taxiway into a second runway for emergency use.
- June 1985: British Airways operated the first commercial Concorde flight from Gatwick.
- 6 February 1986: The last Airlink helicopter shuttle service from Gatwick to Heathrow flew.
- Year ending in April 1987: Gatwick overtook New York JFK as the world's second-busiest international airport with 15.86 million international passengers.
- Late 1987 and early 1988: British Airways took over British Caledonian; the takeover began on 21 December 1987 and was completed on 14 April 1988.
- 18 March 1988: The North Terminal was opened by Queen Elizabeth II (including an automated rapid transit system link to the South Terminal).

== 1990–1999 ==
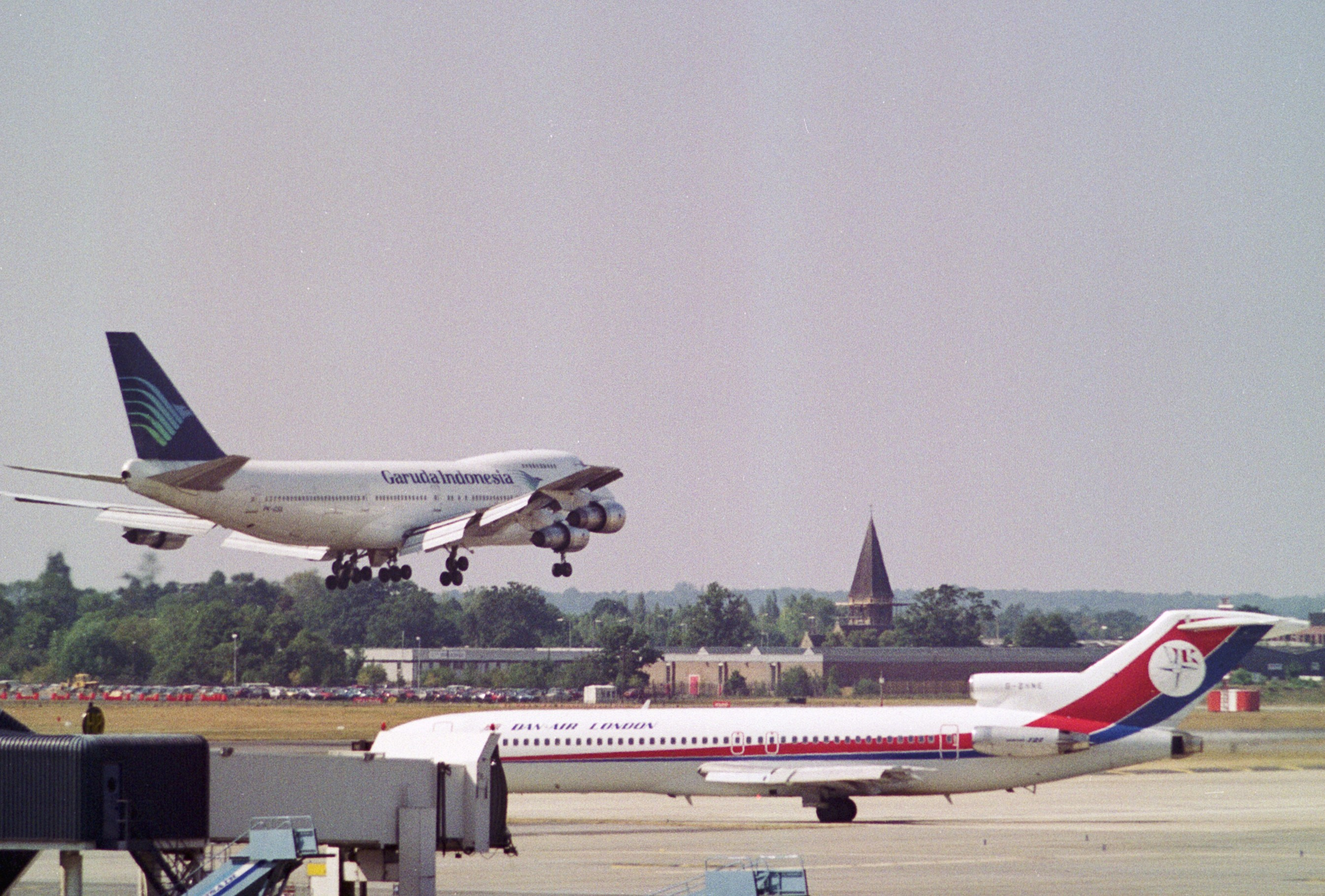
A Dan-Air Boeing 727-200 Advanced and Garuda Indonesia Boeing 747-200B at Gatwick in 1990

- End of the 1989–90 fiscal year: By now, scheduled passengers consistently outnumbered non-scheduled passengers at the airport; non-scheduled passengers had accounted for more than half the airport's passengers for most of the 1960s, 1970s and 1980s.
- 1991: A second aircraft pier was added to the North Terminal. Dan-Air replaced Air Europe as Gatwick's principal short-haul scheduled operator after Air Europe ceased trading early in 1991; both played important roles in the development of the airport's short-haul scheduled route network.
- 1994: The North Terminal international departure lounge and the first phase of the South Terminal international departure lounge opened, at a cost of £30 million.
- 1998: The main runway was extended for a fourth time, reaching 10,879 ft (3,316 m), to enable longer-range operations with wide-body aircraft.
- December 1999: EasyJet began operating from the airport; its first route served Geneva with aircraft and crew from EasyJet Switzerland based at Geneva Airport.

== 2000–2009 ==
- 2000 to 2001: Gatwick's two terminals were further expanded to add seating, retail space and catering outlets, at a cost of £60 million; this included an extension to the North Terminal departure lounge, completed in 2001.
- 2002: EasyJet began stationing planes at Gatwick.

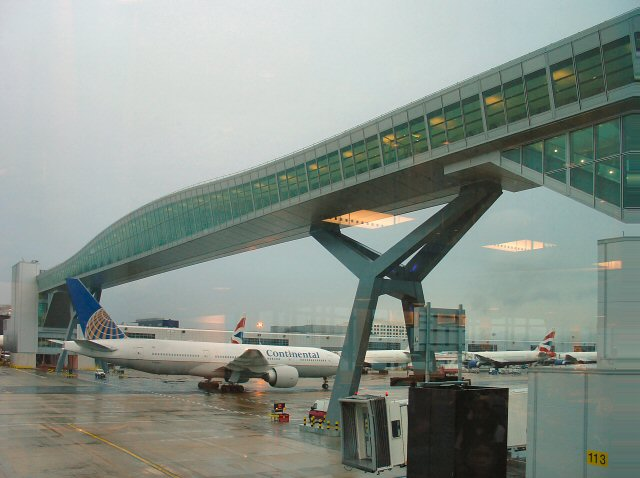
The bridge to Pier 6 in the North Terminal opened in 2005.

- 2005: An extension and refurbishment to the South Terminal's baggage reclaim hall (doubling it in size) was completed.
- 16 May 2005: Pier 6 opened at a cost of £110 million, adding 11 pier-served aircraft stands. The pier is linked to the North Terminal's main building by the largest air passenger bridge in the world, spanning a taxiway and providing passengers with views of the airport and taxiing aircraft.
- May 2008: An extension of the South Terminal's departure lounge was completed, and a second-floor security search area opened. This terminal is now primarily used by low-cost airlines; many former users moved to the North Terminal.
- 12 October 2009: Qatar Airways's daily QR076 Gatwick–Doha scheduled service became the first commercial flight powered by fuel derived from natural gas. The Airbus A340-600HGW operating the six-hour flight ran on a 50–50 blend of synthetic gas-to-liquids (GTL) and conventional, oil-based kerosene developed by Shell instead of oil-based aviation fuel.
- 3 December 2009: Following the agreement to sell the airport to Global Infrastructure Partners, ownership of the airport transferred from BAA Limited to a consortium of private equity funds (led by GIP).

== 2010–present ==
- After the sale of the airport to GIP, Gatwick's new owners announced their intention to proceed with a previously agreed £1 billion investment programme to upgrade and expand the airport's infrastructure from 2008 to 2014. GIP raised the improvement budget to £1.172 billion, and an additional £1 billion from 2014 to 2019 was agreed in February 2013. GIP began to use its relationships to persuade new and existing airlines to consider launching additional routes from Gatwick, reinstating services suspended as a result of the Great Recession following the 2008 financial crisis and the EU-US Open Skies Agreement and expanding existing operations.
- 22 June 2010: Gatwick Airport Limited (GAL) began a new advertising campaign (by Lewis Moberly) for the airport, featuring the slogan "Your London Airport – Gatwick" and dropped "London" from the airport's name.
- 6 July 2012: An Emirates Airbus A380 operated the type's first scheduled service from Gatwick for the airline's 25th anniversary at the airport, in the UK and Europe and to test the aircraft's suitability for the airport.
- Late February 2013: Two A380-compatible stands were completed, enabling jet bridge access from the west end of the North Terminal's Pier 6.

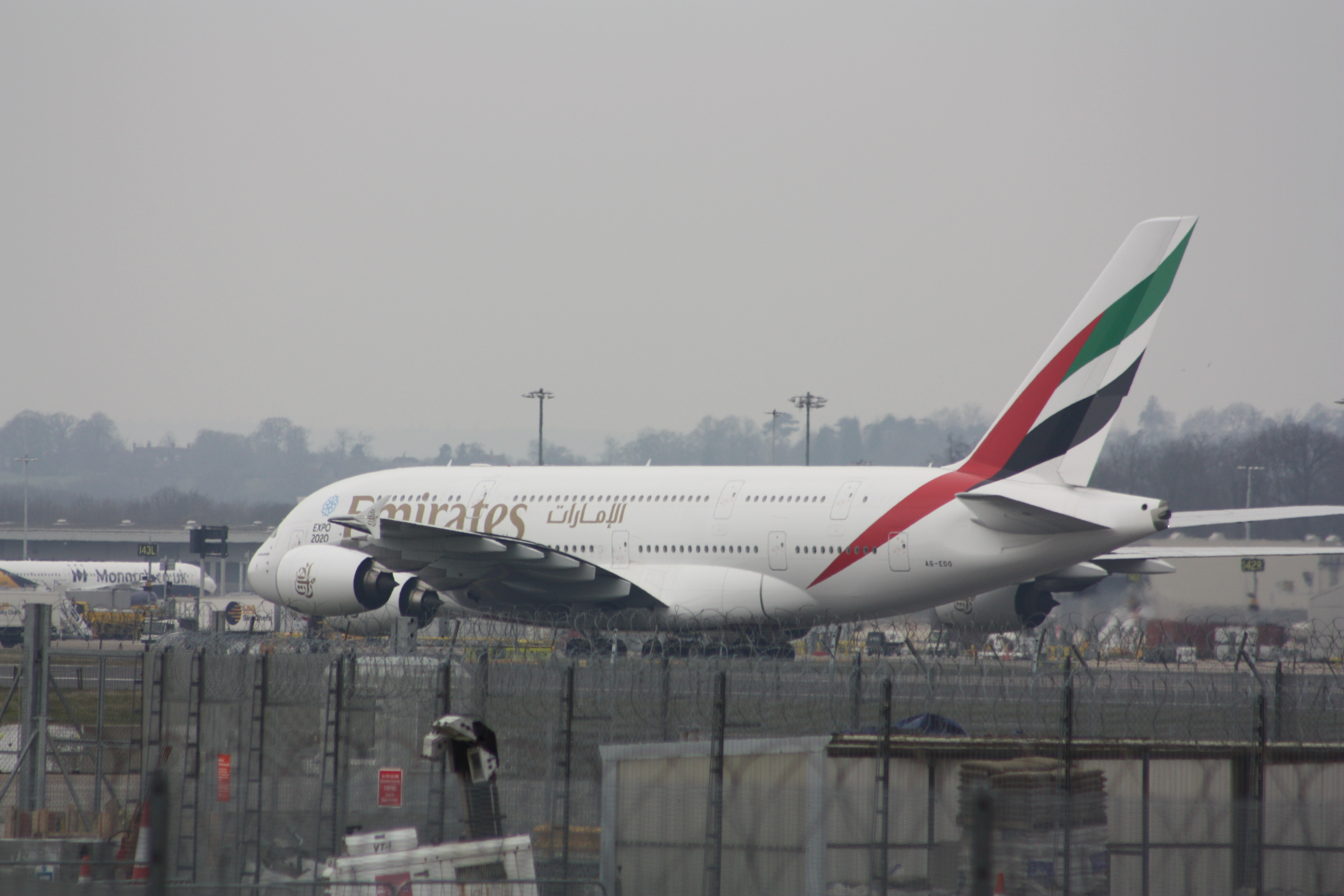
An Emirates Airbus A380 at Gatwick in 2013

- 26 March 2013: Emirates operated a second, one-off scheduled A380 flight from Gatwick to test the airport's new three-bridge gate facility at Pier 6's stand 110. This marked the opening of Gatwick's first pier-served, £6.4 million A380 stand.
- 31 May 2013: Demolition began of Pier 1, Gatwick's second-oldest pier (the original 1962 South pier of what is now the South Terminal) for its replacement with a £180 million, two-storey structure with five pier-served aircraft stands and an automated baggage-storage facility, expected to become operational by summer 2016.
- 21 June 2013: Thomson Airways operated the airport's first Boeing 787 Dreamliner flight, a charter to Menorca which was also the commercial debut of the type for the airline.
- 30 March 2014: Emirates became Gatwick's first airline to operate a regular (as opposed to one-off) scheduled service with the A380.
- 29 August 2014: Gatwick's main runway handled a record 906 movements, equating to an aircraft taking off or landing every 63 seconds. This was believed to be the first time a commercial airport handled more than 900 aircraft movements in one day using only one runway.
- November 2015: Gatwick handled 40 million passengers in a 12-months period for the first time, which was believed to be a global first for a commercial airport with a single-use runway. The 40 millionth passenger departed the airport on board a Norwegian Air Shuttle scheduled flight to San Juan on 14 November.
- 1 February 2016: Caroline Ansell, the MP for Eastbourne, officially opened the redeveloped pier 5 of Gatwick's North Terminal. The redevelopment of pier 5 cost £80 million and forms part of the airport's £2 billion improvement programme under GIP ownership. Its main feature is an additional second level that separates departing and arriving passenger flows vertically to increase capacity by an additional 30 flights or approximately 2,400 passengers per day. This increase in capacity is achieved by accommodating up to seven large and 12 smaller aircraft (or a combination of both) at the pier's redesigned aircraft stands to enhance operational flexibility for airlines and passengers and make passenger journeys smoother.
- 17 May 2016: Gatwick celebrated the 80th anniversary of the first commercial air service from the original Beehive terminal.
- 14 June 2016: Steve Reed, MP for Croydon North, officially opened the new pier 1 of Gatwick's South Terminal. The new pier cost £186 million. Its main feature is a new early bag store, the airport's first. This allows up to 2,600 bags to be checked up to 18 hours before departure. The new pier 1 development also features new dual boarding facilities enabling boarding/disembarkation both via airbridge or aircraft steps to reduce queues at the passenger gates and speed up the boarding/disembarkation process. Other features include a new lounge for premium passengers on top of the new pier with panoramic views across the airfield, four new taxiways and nine additional aircraft holding points
- 24 to 25 January 2017: EasyJet consolidated all its Gatwick operations in the North Terminal on 24 January, while British Airways moved to the South Terminal and Virgin Atlantic to the North Terminal on 25 January to improve the airport's operational efficiency and resilience, as the use of different terminals by EasyJet and British Airways reduces pressure on the North Terminal's check-in, security, boarding and ramp areas at peak times.
- June 2017: Gatwick handled more than 45 million passengers for the first time on a rolling 12-month basis. The airport also offered regular scheduled flights to more than 60 long-haul destinations for the first time, which was believed to be a global first for a commercial airport with a single-use runway.
- 15 January 2018: Gatwick-bound scheduled Norwegian Air Shuttle flight DY7014 from New York JFK with 284 passengers on board, which was operated by the airline's Boeing 787-9 Dreamliner G-CKHL featuring an image of British aviation pioneer Amy Johnson on its tail fin, became the fastest transatlantic flight from New York to London by a subsonic passenger aircraft. The new record of 5 hours and 13 minutes was established as a result of tailwinds reaching a maximum speed of 202 miles per hour (176 kn; 325 km/h) over the Atlantic Ocean. This increased the aircraft's maximum speed to 776 miles per hour (674 kn; 1,249 km/h) and reduced the scheduled flying time by 53 minutes, which enabled the previous record to be bettered by three minutes.
- 9 June 2018: Gatwick celebrated the 60th anniversary of the present-day airport's official opening.
- 13 June 2018: Stewart Wingate, the chief executive of Gatwick Airport, announced the new five-year capital investment plan for the period until 2023 at the British-Irish Airports EXPO in London. This envisages an additional expenditure of £1.11 billion, which takes GIP's total investment since it bought Gatwick from BAA in 2009 to more than £3 billion. Of the planned additional expenditure, £266 million has been allocated to the 2018–19 fiscal year. Amongst others, the main projects covered by this additional expenditure include
  - a westward extension of the North Terminal's pier 6, involving the relocation of the A380 stand to pier 5 and related widening and reconfiguration of a taxiway to enable A380 operators to access the new stand at pier 5
  - a dedicated domestic arrival and baggage reclaim facility in the South Terminal
  - connecting the new Boeing hangar with the airfield.

These and other planned improvements are designed to enable the airport to handle 53 million passengers by 2023.

- 3 October 2018: A regularly scheduled service to Gatwick Airport from Orlando International Airport operated by a Virgin Atlantic Boeing 747-400 was claimed to be the first commercial flight powered by a new type of sustainable aviation biofuel made by US-based LanzaTech from recycled waste carbon gases.
- 20 December 2018: Gatwick was closed for a record 33 hours due to drone activity resulting in the British Army being called to try and identify the drone operator and increase prevention.
- 26 August 2020: Gatwick announced that has plans to cut over a quarter of its employees as a result of a planned company restructuring caused by the effects of the COVID-19 pandemic. The planned cuts will bring the total workforce of the airport to 1,900; before the start of the pandemic it was 3,300, however, additional 785 jobs were cut earlier in 2020.
- 27 April 2023: Gatwick Airport rebrands as London Gatwick, with a new logo and refreshed vision.
