= No. 63 Squadron RAF =

Defunct flying squadron of the Royal Air Force

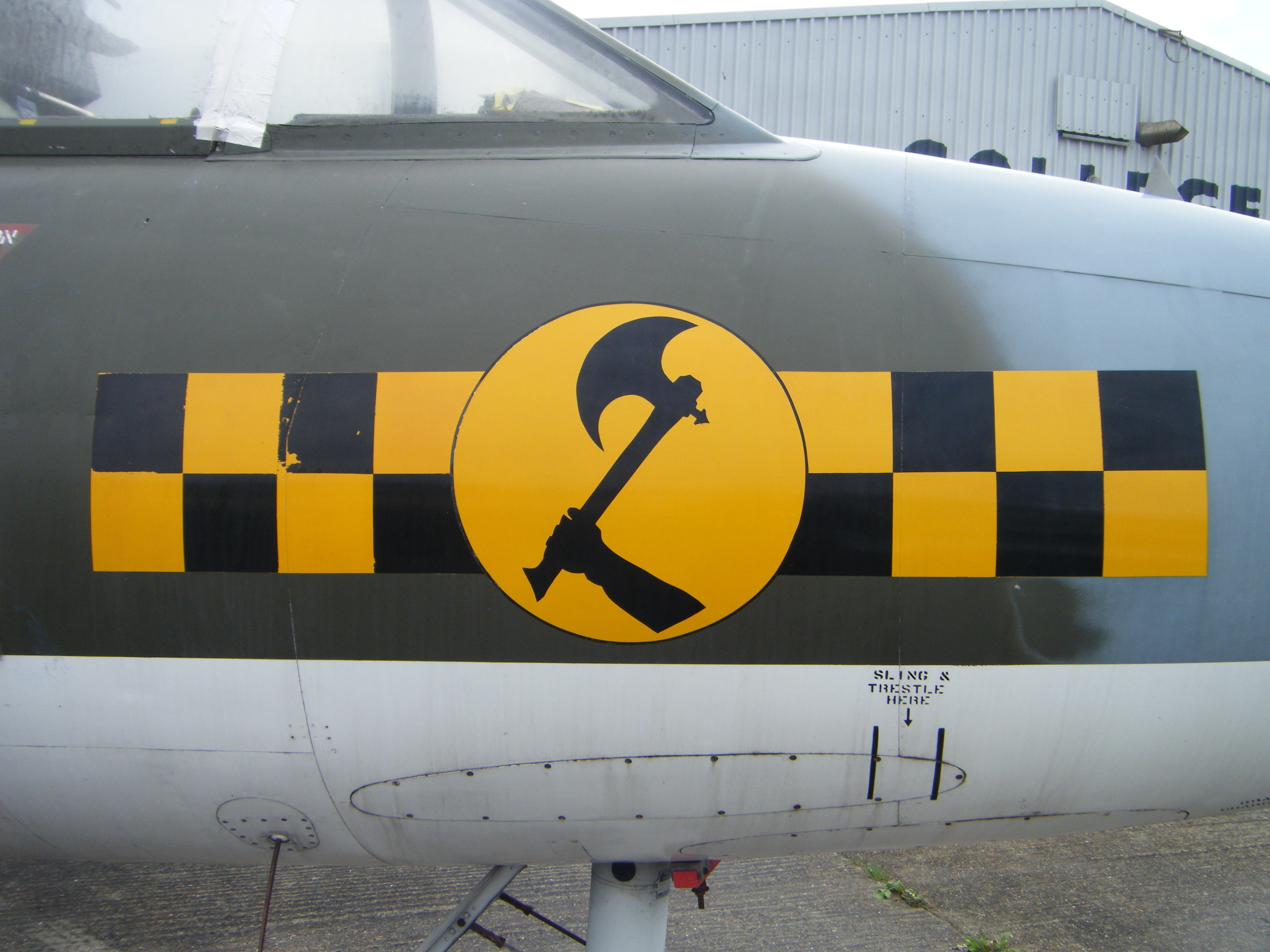
- Hawker Hunter F.6 squadron emblem
- Active: 31 August 1916 – 1 April 1918 (RFC); 1 April 1918 – 29 February 1920 (RAF); February 1937 – April 1940; 15 June 1942 – 30 January 1945; 1 September 1946 – 31 October 1958; 30 November 1958 – 23 September 1992
- Country: United Kingdom
- Branch: Royal Air Force
- Mottos: Latin: Pone nos ad hostem ("Follow us to find the enemy")

Insignia
- Squadron Badge: A dexter arm in bend couped below the elbow grasping in the hand a battle axe Approved by King George VI in December 1938.This squadron chose a battle axe held by a strong arm as being indicative of battle - a sentiment amplified by the motto.
- Squadron Codes: 63 (Feb 1937 – Nov 1938); NE (Nov 1938 – May 1939); ON (May 1939 – Sep 1939); UB (Sep 1946 – Apr 1951)
- Post 1950 Squadron Roundel

Number 63 Squadron was a bomber aircraft and training squadron of the Royal Air Force that was active during various periods from 1916 to 1992. Originally using De Havilland DH.4 aircraft in World War I, it was last equipped with BAe Hawk jet trainers.

== History ==
=== First World War ===
No. 63 Squadron was formed on 31 August 1916 at Stirling, Scotland as a squadron of the Royal Flying Corps. The squadron was intended to operate as a day-bomber unit over the Western Front in France, and was equipped with de Havilland DH.4 aircraft; however at the last minute the squadron was re-tasked to operate against the Turkish army in Mesopotamia (Iraq) and was re-equipped with R.E.8's for its new mission, when the squadron arrived in the Middle East in August 1917. No. 63 Squadron remained in Mesopotamia for the rest of the war, and it was disbanded on 29 February 1920.

=== Inter-war ===
In February 1937 the squadron was refounded at Andover, Hampshire as a bomber unit, and three months later became the first unit to receive the Fairey Battle aircraft. Early in 1939 the unit was assigned an aircrew training role, and received a number of Avro Ansons, but the unit lost its separate identity in April 1940 when it became a part of No. 12 OTU.

=== Second World War ===
On 15 June 1942 No. 63 Squadron was reformed from part of No. 239 Squadron at RAF Gatwick, West Sussex with Alison engined North American Mustang I's. In January 1944 the squadron moved to RAF Turnhouse in Scotland and was re-equipped with Hawker Hurricane IV's in April 1944, converting to Supermarine Spitfire VB's in early May 1944. By the end of May the squadron was based at RNAS Lee-on-Solent, preparing for D-Day. During the allied landings 63 Squadron flew spotter flights above the Royal Navy, providing a form of Forward Air Control (FAC) for the naval gunners supporting the troops on land. The pilots of the squadron at this stage were drawn from former Army co-operation units, The Royal Marines and as well as the RAF. On 20 September 1944 the squadron relocated to RAF North Weald. The squadron was disbanded on 1 February 1945.

=== Post-war: enter the jets ===
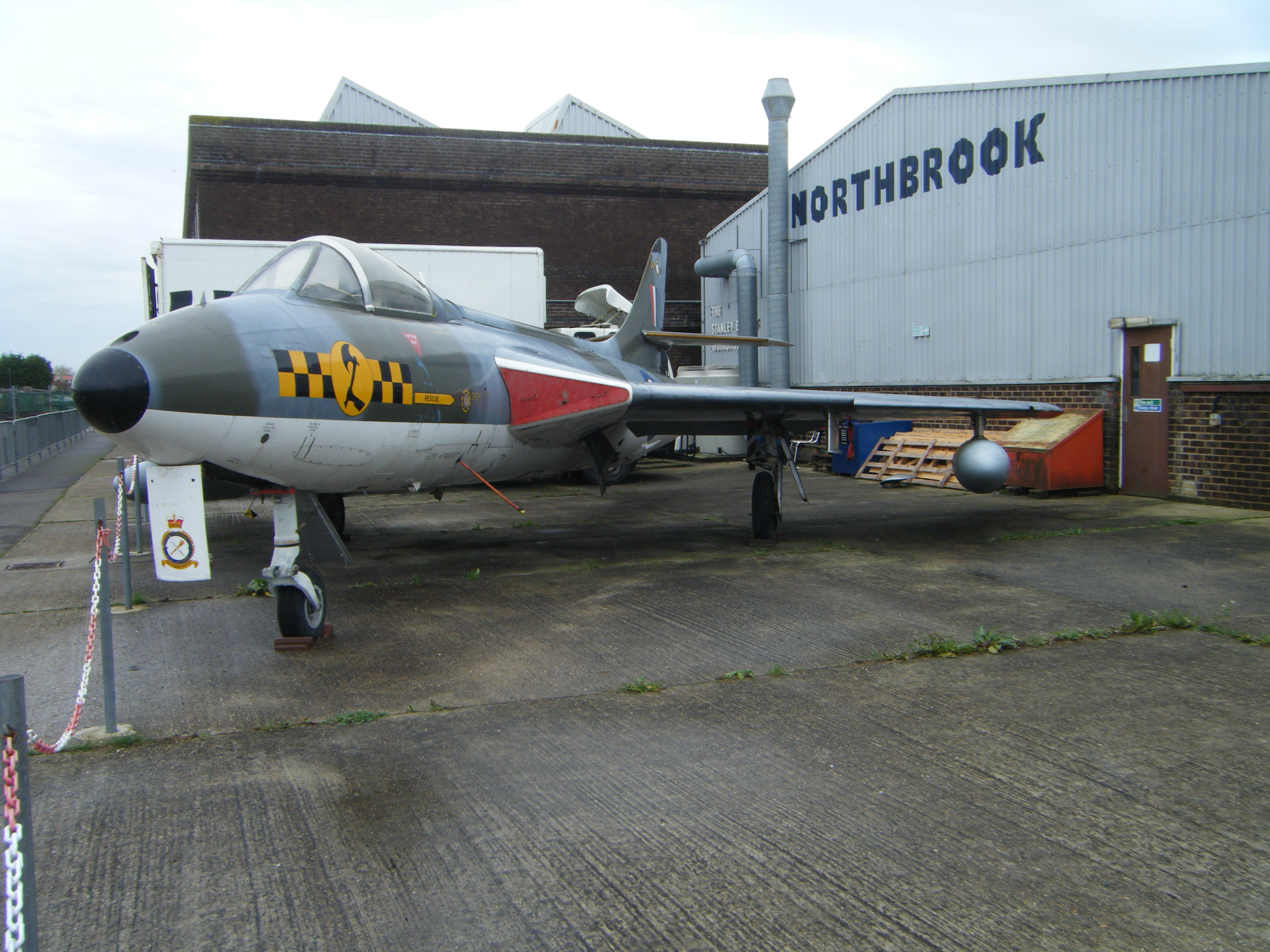
A Hawker Hunter fighter jet in the markings of No. 63 Sqn

On 1 September 1946, No. 164 Squadron was renumbered as No. 63 Squadron, operating Spitfires from RAF Middle Wallop. Subsequently they moved to RAF Thorney Island, and shortly after in April 1948, the squadron was re-equipped with Gloster Meteor jet fighters. The squadron moved again, this time to RAF Waterbeach, Cambridgeshire, in May 1950. After re-equipping with Hawker Hunter fighters in 1956, the squadron was disbanded again on 31 October 1958.

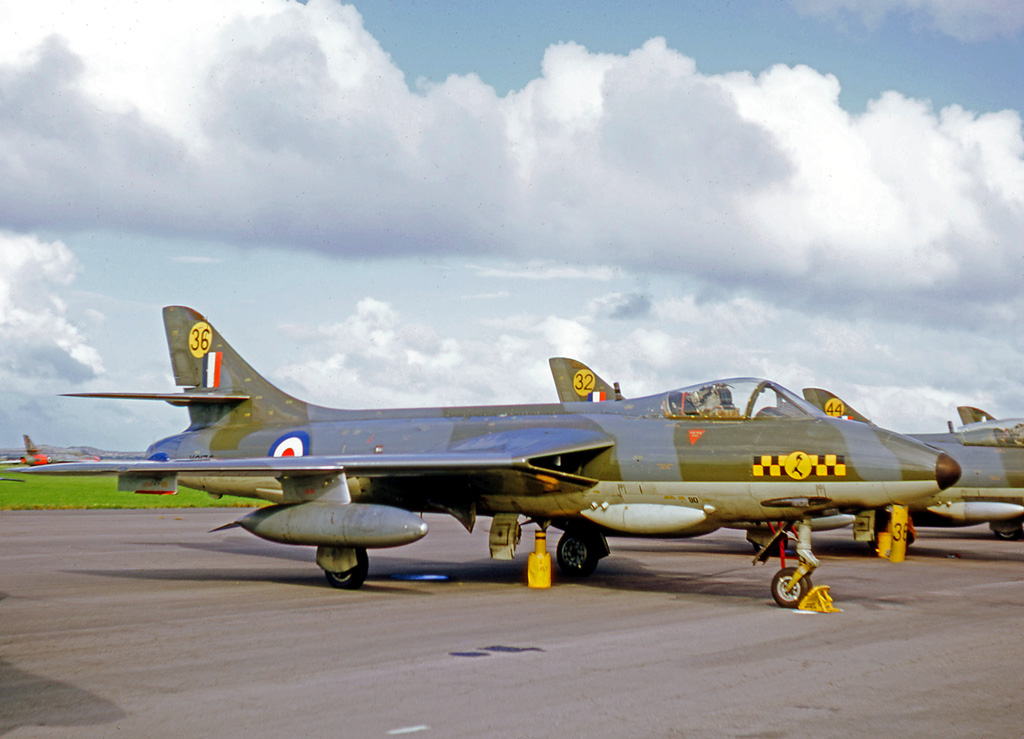
Operational Hawker Hunter F.6 of No. 63 (Shadow) Squadron at its RAF Chivenor base in 1969

63 Squadron reformed as a 'Shadow' unit for the Day Fighter Combat Squadron of the Central Fighter Establishment from 30 November 1958 until 1 June 1963. On the same day the number was transferred to No. 229 Operational Conversion Unit. based at RAF Chivenor, North Devon, as the 'Shadow' designation for one of its constituent squadrons. On 2 September 1970 No. 229 OCU was re-designated as the Tactical Weapons Unit and 63 squadron remained one of its 'Shadow' units. 63 squadron was transferred to No 2 TWU at RAF Chivenor, initially operating Hawker Hunter aircraft, and later, the BAE Hawk and when that unit was redesignated No 7 FTS on 1 April 1992, 63 Squadron remained a component part until 23 September 1992; when 63 Squadron last disbanded and its role was transferred to No. 19 (Reserve) Squadron.

== Aircraft operated ==
From	To	Aircraft	Version
Jul 1916	June 1917	various	
Aug 1917	Dec 1919	Royal Aircraft Factory B.E.2	B.E.2e
Aug 1917	Apr 1919	de Havilland DH4	
Aug 1917	Feb 1918	Bristol Scout	
Aug 1917	Apr 1918	Spad S.7	
Sep 1917	Feb 1920	Royal Aircraft Factory R.E.8	
Sep 1917	Aug 1919	Martinsyde G.102	
Jan 1919	Dec 1919	Bristol M.1	M.1c
Feb 1919	Apr 1919	Royal Aircraft Factory S.E.5	S.E.5a
May 1919	Aug 1919	Sopwith Camel	
Feb 1937	Mar 1937	Hawker Hind	
Mar 1937	Jun 1937	Hawker Audax	
May 1937	Apr 1940	Fairey Battle	
Mar 1939	Apr 1940	Avro Anson	Mk.I
Jun 1942	May 1944	North American Mustang	Mk.I, Ia
Mar 1944	May 1944	Hawker Hurricane	Mk.IIc, Mk.IV
Mar 1944	Jan 1945	Supermarine Spitfire	Mk.Vb
Sep 1946	Mar 1948	Supermarine Spitfire	LF.16e
Apr 1948	Jun 1948	Gloster Meteor	F.3
Jun 1948	Jan 1951	Gloster Meteor	F.4
Dec 1950	Jan 1957	Gloster Meteor	F.8
Nov 1956	Sep 1992	Hawker Hunter	F.6
Aug 1980	Sep 1992	BAE Hawk	T.1、T.1A
