= No. 116 Squadron RAF =

Defunct flying squadron of the Royal Air Force

- Active: 1917–18 (RFC); 1941–45 & 1952–58 (RAF)
- Country: United Kingdom
- Branch: Royal Air Force
- Role: Bomber Command and Anti-Aircraft Calibration
- Motto(s): "Precision in Defence"
- Aircraft: Westland Lysander; Hawker Hurricane de Havilland Tiger Moth; Avro Anson; Airspeed Oxford; Vickers Varsity; Avro Lincoln
- Battle honours: First World War 1917-1918; Second World War; Home Defence 1941-1945

Insignia
- Squadron badge: In front of a flash of lightning, a pair of dividers.
- Squadron codes: ZD (Allocated Apr 1939 - Sep 1939); II (Apr 1939 - Sep 1939)

No. 116 Squadron RAF was a Royal Air Force squadron first formed as part of the Royal Flying Corps during the First World War. Reformed as part of the RAF during the Second World War it served as an anti-aircraft calibration unit and also operated post-war from 1952 until 1958.

== History ==
The squadron was formed at RAF Andover in December 1917. The nameplate No. 116 Squadron RAF was applied to the squadron as of 1 April 1918 whilst it was at RAF Netheravon. The squadron was disbanded at Feltham in the same year. It was resurrected as No. 116 Squadron from No. 1 Anti-Aircraft Calibration Flight (AACF) at Hatfield in February 1941 flying various aircraft during the Second World War (Lysanders, Hurricanes, Spitfires, Oxford and Tiger Moths) before being disbanded a second time at Hornchurch in May 1945.

During its time as an AACF, the squadron helped to calibrate the predictors on Anti-Aircraft batteries and so ended up with many detachments spread out across the United Kingdom. Flights were flown from RAF Digby, RAF Hendon, RAF Heston, RAF Croydon, RAF North Weald, RAF Gatwick and Redhill.

It was reformed a second time in August 1952 from 'N' calibration flight at RAF Watton and continued for six years in this role flying Lincolns, Ansons, Hastings and Varsity aircraft. Its role at RAF Watton was as part of the Central Signals Establishment which would deploy 116 Squadron (and others) as Radio Counter Measure aircraft during exercises involving not only the RAF, but other nation's forces too. It was disbanded at RAF Watton in 1958 to become No. 115 Squadron RAF.
