= List of defunct airlines of the United Kingdom =

This is a list of defunct airlines of the United Kingdom.

Airline	Image	IATA	ICAO	Callsign	Commenced operations	Ceased operations	Notes
A
Avro Transport Company					1919	1920	First regular airline in the UK
A2B Airways					2005	2005	Established as Flykeen Airways. Acquired by British NorthWest Airlines
AB Airlines		7L	AZX	AZTEC	1993	1999	Previously Air Bristol, also used marketing names Air Belfast and AB Shannon.
Aberdeen Airways (1989)		SM	AAW	GRANITE	1989	1992	Traded as North East Express 1991-1992
Aberdeen London Express					1994	1994	Operated BAC 1-11
ACE Freighters					1964	1966	Registered trading name of Aviation Charter Enterprises
ACE Scotland					1966	1966	Registered trading name of Aviation Charter Enterprises (Scotland). ACE Freighters subsidiary
Aer Lingus UK		EG	EUK	GREEN FLIGHT	2021	2026	UK-based subsidiary of Irish flag carrier, Aer Lingus, headquartered in Belfast. Ceased operations and brand was retired following Manchester Airport base closure
Aerofilms					1919	1925	Taken over by Hunting Aerosurveys
Air Alba			RLB		1991	1997	Renamed Highland Airways
Air Anglia		AQ	AQ	ANGLIAN	1970	1980	Merged with British Island Airways to form AirUK
Air Atlanta Europe					2003	2006	Air Atlanta (Iceland) subsidiary. Renamed XL Airways
Air Atlantique					1969	1990	Established as General Aviation Services in 1969. Operated Douglas DC-3
ABC-Air Bridge Carriers		AB			1972	1992	Rebranded Air Bridge in 1980. Renamed Hunting Cargo Airlines
Air Caledonian			CSF		2004	2005	
Air Camelot					1978	1987	Operated Trislander
Air Cavrel			ACL	CAVREL	1998	1999	Operated Short 330
Air Charter Limited					1947	1960	Merged to form British United Airways
Air Commerce					1938	1947	Operations transferred to British European Airways
Air Commuter		3A	ACK		1982	1984	Operated leased BAe Jetstream, BAe.748 (as Venture Airways), DH.104, leased EMB-110
Air Condor					1960	1960	Operated Bristol Freighter, Vickers VC.1 Viking
Air Continental					1979	1983	Operated Beechcraft 65, and Piper PA-31 for cargo runs
Air Contractors					1946	1949	Operated Douglas C-47A, Bristol Freighter, Miles Aerovan
Air Dispatch					1936	1940	
Air Ecosse		EC	ECS	AIR ECOSSE	1977	1987	Originally a subsidiary of Fairflight Charters
Air Enterprises					1947	1953	Operated de Havilland Dragon Rapide on British European Airways behalf
Air Envoy					1968	1970	No flight operations. Renamed Central Air Services
Air Europe		AE	AOE	AIR EUROPE	1979	1991	
Air Europe Express		AX	AEE		1984	1991	Previously Connectair Ltd.
Air Exel UK		EXX			1989	1993	Operated Embraer Brasilia
Air Faisal (Air Faisel)		KV			1975	1978	Operated Bristol Britannia
Air Ferry Limited					1962	1968	
Air Foyle HeavyLift		GS	UPA	FOYLE	2001	2006	Formed as a joint venture between Air Foyle Ltd. and HeavyLift Cargo Airlines
Air Freight					1971	1975	Renamed Skyways Cargo
Air Freight Express		5Z	AFX		1999	2003	Operated Boeing 747-200
Air Furness		GB			1984	1988	Operated BN.2 between Barrow and Manchester
Air Gregory					1965	1969	Trading name of both Gregory Air Taxis and Gregory Air Services operations. Operated Cessna 172, Piper Aztec, Douglas C-47A, Piper Twin Comanche
Air Hanson					1965	2000	Operated BAC 1-11
Air Hire					1934	1935	Established as Wrightson Air Hire in 1933. Operated de Havilland Leopard Moth
Air International		AK			1971	1972	Operated Vickers Viscount
Air Kilroe		9R	AKL	KILROE	1978	1999	Merged scheduled operations into Eastern Airways. Operated BAe Jetstream
Air Kruise					1946	1958	
Air Links					1959	1965	Operated Douglas C-47A, Canadair C-4 Argonaut, Handley Page Hermes Renamed Transglobe Airways
Air Luton					1985	1986	Operated Douglas C-47A, Piper Navajo
Air Manchester				SUREWAY	1982	1982	
Air Medical			MCD	AIR MED	1985	2016	Operated Learjet 35, Piper Cheyenne, Piper PA-31T Cheyenne
Air Metro					1988	1989	Trading name of Ellan Vannin Airlines. Operated Swearingen Metro
Air Oxford					1979	1984	Operated Piper Chieftain, Piper Navajo Renamed TopFlight
Air Safaris					1954	1962	Previously African Air Safaris
Air Sarnia					1989	1990	
Air Scandic			SCY	AIRSCAN	2003	2005	
Air Scotland			SCO		2003	2005	
Air Shetland					1978	1980	Operated leased Embraer Bandeirante
Air Southwest		SZ	WOW	SWALLOW	2003	2011	
Air Swift			SWF		1986	1996	Operated BAe Jetstream 31, Beech King Air
Air Sylhet		SL	SHR	SYLHET	2009	2009	
Air Taxi (Cumberland)					1954	1961	Operated de Havilland Dragon Rapide
Air Transcontinental Airlines					1979	1980	Previously Transasian Airlines
Air Transport Charter					1947	1952	
Air UK Leisure		MV	UKL	LEISURE	1988	1993	Renamed Leisure International Airways
Air Ulster					1968	1970	Trading name of Ulster Air Transpor
Air Wales (1977)					1977	1979	Assets sold to Air Anglia
Air Wales		6G	AWW	RED DRAGON	2000	2006	
Air West					1978	1979	Transferred scheduled operations to British Island Airways (BIA)
Aircraft Operating Company					1924	1944	Acquired by Hunting Aerosurveys
Aircraft Transport and Travel					1916	1921	A subsidiary of Airco, its assets were used to create Daimler Airway. Through numerous takeovers and mergers, it became a part of British Airways.
Airflight					1948	1950	merged operations into Fairflight
AirRep (UK)					1991		Operated with leased aircraft
Airspan Travel					1948	1950	Operated Airspeed Consul
Airtours International		VZ	AIH	TOURJET then KESTREL from 1997	1991	2002	Renamed MyTravel Airways
AirUK		UK	UKA	UKAY	1980	2002	Merged to form KLM Cityhopper UK/KLM uk
Airviews					1946	1959	Operated de Havilland Dragon Rapide, de Havilland Dove
Airways International Cymru		AK	CYM	WELSHAIR	1984	1988	
Airwork Limited		AW			1928	1960	Merged with Hunting-Clan Air Transport to form British United Airways
Airworld Aviation		RL	AWD	ENVOY	1994	1998	Merged into Flying Colours Airlines
Alan Cobham Aviation					1927	1928	Founded by Alan Cobham
Alderney Air Charter					1972	1975	Operated Cessna Skymaster. Operated in parallel with Mossair
Alderney Air Ferries					1979	1982	Operated BN-2 Islander. Merged into Metropolitan Airways
Alidair		QA			1972	1983	Operated Vickers Viscount. Traded as Inter City Airlines 1981-1983
Alidair Scotland							Trading name of Alidair Aberdeen and Sumburgh based charter operations
All Cargo Airlines		UF			1978	1979	Operated leased Bristol Britannia
All Leisure Airlines			ALT	JETWING	1996	1997	Assets sold to TransAer International Airlines in 1997
Allied Airways (Gandar Dower)					1934	1947	Previously Aberdeen Airways until 1937. Merged scheduled operations into British European Airways
Alpha One Airways					2005	2006	Virtual airline
Ambassador Airways		B3	AMY	AMBASSADOR	1992	1994	
Amber Air		DD	ABM	DIAMOND	1988	1988	Operated Boeing 737-200. Merged operations into Paramount Airways
Anglian Air Charter					1950	1970	Merged with Norfolk Airways and Rig Air to form Air Anglia
Anglo Airlines/Anglo Cargo		ML	ANC	ANGLO	1983	1992	Operated Boeing 707-320F, leased Boeing 757F, leased BAC 1-11
Anglo European Airways					1937	1940	Operated DH.84, DH.89, DH.90 Dragonfly
Anglo Normandy Aviation					1975	1979	Acquired by Aurigny Air Services. Operated Piper Aztec
Aquila Airways					1948	1958	
Argus Air Transport					1957	1960	Renamed Autair
Ascend Airways		YD	SYG	SYNERGY	2024	2026	ACMI and charter airline whose parent company was Avia Solutions Group
Astraeus Airlines		5W	AEU	FLYSTAR	2002	2011	
Astral Aviation					1947	1948	Merged into Lancashire Aircraft Corporation
Atlanta Airways (UK)		KG			1996	1996	Low cost subsidiary of Caledonian Airways. Operated Lockheed Tristar
Atlantic Air Transport					1984	1989	Air Atlantique brand. Operated Bristol Freighter
Atlantic Airlines			NPT	NEPTUNE	1994	2013	Air Atlantique brand 1998-2004. Fully registered in 2004. Joint operations with West Air Sweden 2009-2017. Merged into West Atlantic UK
Atlantic Airways (UK)			ALH		1993	1998	Air Atlantique brand. Operated Fairchild Metroliner
Atlantic Bridge Aviation					1997	2000	Operated Trislander
AV8 Air			MNF	RINGWAY	2003	2004	Trading name of Man Air
B
BA Connect		TH	BRT	BRITISH	2006	2007	Previously British Airways CitiExpress. Merged into British European Airways/Flybe
BAC Aircraft			ABR		1992	2007	Rebranded BAC Express Airlines 1995-2007 Renamed HD Air
BAC Express Airlines			RPX		1995	2007	BAC Aircraft brand
Baltic Airlines					1988	1989	Operated Vickers Viscount Merged into British Air Ferries
Baylee Air Charter		BC			1971	1978	Operated Piper Aztec
BBC Air					1996	2009	Operated de Havilland Dove
Benair					1999	1999	Established as Martini Airfreight Services in 1996. Operated Cessna 208B
Berkshire Aviation Company					1919	1922	Founded by East Hanney, John and Fred Holmes. Operated Avro 504
Berkshire Aviation Tours					1924	1929	Amalgamated with Northern Air Transport. Operated Avro 504
Berlin European UK		WZ	RGN		1987	1991	Previously Berlin Regional UK. Merged operations into Germania
Birkett Air Services					1933	1953	Operated de Havilland Dragon Rapide
Birmingham European Airways		VB	BEA	BIRMEX	1983	1993	Previously Birmingham Executive Airways. Joint operations with Brymon Airways 1992-1993. Merged into Maersk Air UK
BKS Aero Charter					1952	1953	Operated Douglas DC-3. Renamed BKS Air Transport
BKS Air Transport					1952	1970	Acquired by British European Airways and renamed Northeast Airlines
Blackpool and West Coast Air Services					1933	1937	Renamed West Coast Air Services
Blue-Air					1959	1959	Independent Air Transport brand in 1959
Blue Islands		SI	BCI	BLUE ISLAND	2006	2025	
Blue-Line Airways					1947	1949	Operated Douglas C-47B, Avro Anson
BMI Regional		WW/BM	GNT/BMR		1987	2018	Known as Business Air until 2001. Also used trading names British Midland Commuter and flybmi.
bmibaby		WW	BMI	BABY	2002	2012	British Midland Airways 100% subsidiary
BOAC-Cunard					1962	1966	
Bon Accord Airways			BON		1992	1995	Founded by John Begg. Operated Short 330-200, Short 360-100
Bond Air Services					1946	1951	Operated de Havilland Express
Bournemouth Air Taxi Co./"Bournair"					1961	1967	Merged operations into Bournemouth Flying Club
Bostonair					1982	1998	Operated Cessna 310
Bristol Air Taxis					1968	1979	Operated Piper Navajo
Britannia Airways		BY	BAL	BRITANNIA	1962	2005	Previously Euravia. Renamed Thomsonfly
Britavia-British Aviation Services					1954	1959	
British Air Ferries (BAF)		VF	BAF	AIR FERRY	1967	1993	Previously British United Air Ferries. Renamed British World Airlines
British Air Services					1967	1972	Additional operating name of B.K.S. A.T. and Cambrian Airways
British Air Transport (BAT)					1932	1951	
British Airtours		KT	BKT	BEATOURS	1969	1988	Founded as BEA Airtours, merged into Caledonian Airways
British Airways Ltd					1935	1940	Merged with Imperial Airways to form British Overseas Airways Corporation (BOAC)
British Airways Ltd (2012–2015)		BA	BAT	GHERKIN	2012	2015	
British Airways CitiExpress		TH	BRT	BRITISH	2002	2006	Renamed BA Connect
British Airways Express		TH	MXE		1993		Trading name of scheduled operations performed on behalf of British Airways by several regional airlines from both U.K. and Continental Europe
British Airways Helicopters					1964	1986	Founded as BEA Helicopters. Sold to Maxwell Aviation and renamed British International Helicopters
British Airways Regional					1992	1996	Merged operations into British Airways
British Airways World Cargo					2001	2014	Merged with Iberia Cargo to form IAG Cargo
British American Air Services					1935	1950	Operated Handley Page Halifax, DH.89, Bristol B-170
British Amphibious Airlines					1932	1933	
British Asia Airways		BR	BAW	SPEEDBIRD	1993	2001	Trading name of British Airways Boeing 747 operations to Taiwan
British Aviation Services					1946	1962	Transformed into a holding company for Air Kruise, Dragon Airways, Ferry Airports-Manx Airlines, Lancashire Aircraft, Silver City Airways
British Caledonian		BR	BCA	CALEDONIAN	1970	1988	Merged into British Airways
British Caledonian Charter		JB			1972	1986	Renamed Cal Air International
British Caledonian Commuter		BR	BCA	CALEDONIAN			Trading name of scheduled operations performed on behalf of British Caledonian by several regional airlines from both U.K. and Continental Europe
British Cargo Airlines		FF			1979	1980	Formed by merger of Transmeridian Air Cargo and IAS Cargo Airlines
British Continental Airways					1935	1936	Merged into British Airways in 1936
British Eagle International Airlines		EG	EGT		1948	1968	Formerly Eagle Airways
British European Airways (BEA) (1946-1974)		BE	BEE	BEALINE	1946	1974	Merged to form British Airways
British Flying & Motor Services					1927	1927	Operated Airco DH.6
British Independent Airways					1989	1991	Operated HS 748
British International Helicopters		BS	BIH	BRINTEL	2000	2012	Previously British Airways Helicopters. Branded Brintel
(1st) British Island Airways (BIA)		UK	BIA	BRITISLAND	1970	1980	Merged with Air Anglia, Air Wales and Air Westland to form AirUK
(2nd) British Island Airways		KD	BIA	BRITISLAND	1982	1990	Formed in 1982 out of AirUK's charter operations
British Jet					2005	2009	Trading name of Malta Bargains
British Latin American Air Lines-BLAIR					1944	1945	Renamed British South American Airways
British Marine Air Navigation Co Ltd					1923	1924	Merged with Handley Page Transport, Instone Air Line and Daimler Airway to form Imperial Airways
British Mediterranean Airways		KJ	LAJ	BEE MED	1994	2007	MED from 2004.
British Midland International (BMI)		BD	BMA	MIDLAND	1949	2012	Known as Derby Airways until 1964, British Midland Airways until 2001. Merged into British Airways
British Nederland Air Services					1947	1950	Operated Douglas C-47A
British NorthWest Airlines		W9	BNW	BRITISH NORTH	2002	2006	
British Overseas Air Charter Ltd.					1971	1972	BOAC's charter subsidiary
British Overseas Airways Corporation (BOAC)		BA		SPEEDBIRD	1939	1974	Merged to form British Airways
British Regional Airlines		JE TH	MXE BRT	EUROMANX BRITISH	1991	2002	Established as Manx Airlines (Europe). Merged to form British Airways CitiExpress
British South American Airways					1946	1949	Merged into British Overseas Airways Corporation
British United (C.I.) Airways					1962	1968	Previously Jersey Airlines. Operated Handley Page Dart Herald. Renamed British United Airways (C.I.) in 1967. Merged to form British United Island Airways.
British United Air Ferries				BUAF	1963	1967	Renamed British Air Ferries
British United Airways (BUA)		BR	BUA	BRITISH UNITED	1960	1970	Merged to form Caledonian/BUA
British United Island Airways (BUIA)		UK			1968	1970	Renamed British Island Airways
British Westpoint Airlines		WP			1963	1966	Previously Westpoint Aviation
British World Airlines		VF	BWL	BRITWORLD	1993	2001	Previously British Air Ferries
Brooklands Aviation					1933	1954	Operated de Havilland Dragon Rapide on British European Airways behalf
Brown Air Services					1983	1987	Operated Cessna 441 Conquest II. Renamed Capital Airlines (UK)
Brymon Aviation/Brymon Airways		BC	BRY	BRYMON	1973	2002	Merged to form British Airways Citiexpress
Brymon European Airways		BC	BRY		1992	1993	Trading name of Birmingham European AW + Brymon Av. joint operations
Burnthills Aviation					1974	1985	
Buzz		PL	BUZ	BUZZARD	2000	2004	Operated as Buzz Stansted 2003-2004
By Air					1919	1920	Operated Armstrong Whitworth F.K.8
C
C.L. Air Surveys					1947	1959	Operated Avro Anson, Handley Page Halifax
Cal Air International		EN	CAI	CALJET	1972	1988	Founded as British Caledonian Charter. Renamed Novair International Airways
Caledonian Airways		CA			1961	1970	merged to form Caledonian/BUA
Caledonian Airways (1988)		KG	CKT	CALEDONIAN	1988	2000	Merged into JMC Air
Cambrian Airways		CS	CAS	CAMBRIAN	1935	1972	Merged into British Airways-Regional Division-Cambrian
Capital Airlines		BZ	CPG	CAPITAL	1987	1990	Previously Brown A.S.
CargoLogicAir		P3	CLU	FIREBIRD	2015	2022	Operated Boeing 747
Casair Aviation Services					1972	1982	Merged scheduled operations into Genair
CCF Aviation					1963	1966	Operated Piper Aztec and Piper Comanche
Cello Aviation			CLJ	CELLO	2009	2018	Founded as Altavia Jet Services
Celtic Airways			CIC	CELTAIR	1989	1993	
Central Air Services					1971	1973	Previously Air Envoy
Centreline Air Services					1978	1983	Operated Cessna 310, Embraer Bandeirante, HS 748, Piper Navajo Chieftain
Channel Air Bridge					1959	1962	Merged to form British United Air Ferries
Channel Air Ferries					1936	1939	
Channel Air Services (Jersey)					1953	1956	
Channel Airways		CW		CHANNEL AIR	1962	1972	Previously East Anglian Flying Services
Channel Express		LS	EXS	CHANNEX	1983	2006	Previously Express Air Services. Merged into Jet2
Channel Islands Air Freight (Chanair)					1948	1954	Operated Miles Aerovan
Channel Islands Airways					1945	1947	Holding company for both Jersey Airways and Guernsey Airways. Operated Bristol Freighter. Assets merged into British European Airways
Chartair					1946	1951	Operated Handley Page Halifax
Chauffair					1980	2001	Jet charter business. Operated Hawker Siddeley HS.125
Chieftain Airways		PQ			1987	1987	Operated HS 748
Chrisair					1961	1968	Operated DH.84, DH.89, Cessna 172, Piper Twin Comanche
Ciro's Aviation					1947	1951	Operated Douglas DC-3 in Berlin Airlift, and DH.89
Citelynx Travel					2005	2007	
City Air Bus					1994	1995	
City Airways					2013	2013	Short-lived regional airline
City Star Airlines		X9	ISL	ISLANDIA	2005	2008	
CityFlyer Express		CJ	CFE	FLYER	1992	2002	Previously Euroworld Airways. Merged to form British Airways CitiExpress
Citywing					2013	2017	Operated Let L-410 Turbolet
Classic Airways			CCN	CLASSIC JET	1997	1998	Operated Lockheed Tristar
Claydon Aviation					1958	1958	Operated Vickers VC.1 Viking. Renamed Pegasus Airlines
Club 328			SDJ	SPACEJET	2005	2008	
Cobham Air Routes					1935	1935	Operated Westland IV
Comed Aviation					1994	2001	Operated Embraer Bandeirante
Commercial Air Hire					1935	1936	Operated Avro 642 Eighteen, de Havilland Dragon
Community Express Airlines		5V	UNI	COMMUNITY	1995	1996	
Connectair		AX			1984	1989	Renamed Air Europe Ex
Continental Air Services & Continental Air Transport					1957	1960	Operated Douglas C-54, Vickers VC.1 Viking
Cougar Leasing (Cougar Airways)					2001	2003	Traded as JJ Airways in 2001.
Cougar Air Cargo					2001	2001	Operated Boeing 727-200
Court Line		OU		COURTLINE	1961	1974	Previously Autair International Airways
Crewsair					1952	1953	Operated Douglas DC-3, Vickers VC.1 Viking
Crilly Airways					1935	1936	
Culliford Airlines					1947	1951	Operated Avro Anson, Miles Aerovan
Cunard Eagle Airways		EG			1960	1963	Previously Eagle Aviation. Renamed/merged into British Eagle
D
Daimler Air Hire					1919	1921	Acquired Aircraft Transport and Travel to form Daimler Airway
Daimler Airway					1922	1924	Merged with British Marine Air Navigation Co Ltd, Instone Air Line and Handley Page Transport to form Imperial Airways
Dan-Air		DA	DAN	DANAIR	1953	1992	Merged into British Airways
Dan-Air Skyways					1972	1973	Previously International Skyways. Dan-Air subsidiary. Operated HS 748
Debonair		2G	DEB	DEBONAIR	1996	1999	
de Havilland Aeroplane Hire					1922	1922	Operated Airco DH.9C
Denham Air Services					1948	1949	Operated Piper Aztec
Dennis Aviation					1946	1951	Operated Airspeed Consul, Avro Anson, Percival Proctor. Merged into Transair
Derby Airways					1959	1964	Operated Handley Page Marathon, Canadair Argonaut. Renamed British Midland Airways
Derby Aviation					1947	1959	Merged airline-type operations into Derby Airways
Devonair					1952	1962	Operated DH.89A. DH.90
Dominie Airways					1967	1967	Treffield Aviation subsidiary. Operated de Havilland Dragon Rapide
Don Everall Aviation					1951	1960	Merged into Air Safaris. Operated de Havilland Dragon Rapide, Douglas DC-3, Miles Messenger, Vickers VC.1 Viking
Donaldson International Airways		DI		DONALDSON	1969	1974	
Dragon Airways					1953	1957	Operated DH.89 de Havilland Dragon Rapide, DH.114 de Havilland Heron. Merged into Silver City Airways-Northern Division
Duo Airways		VB	DUO	FLY DUO	2003	2004	Previously Maersk Air Ltd./Maersk Air UK
E
Eagle European Airways					1993	1994	Previously Merrix Air
East Anglian Flying Services					1947	1962	Renamed Channel Airways
Eastern Air Transport					1932	1934	Operated de Havilland Fox Moth
Eastern Airways (1978-1982)		EN			1978	1982	Trading name of Lease Air flight operations. Merged operations into Genair Ltd.
Eastern Airways (1997-2025)		T3	EZE	EASTERN	1997	2025	
Edinburgh Air Services					1971	1979	Operated Reims Cessna F172, Cessna 150
Edwin Air Cargo					2018	2019	Operated Antonov An-26
Elan Air					1983	1989	Trading name of Elan Air Freight. Renamed DHL Air UK
Ellan Vannin Airlines					1991	1991	Merged into Air Sarnia
Emerald Airways (1965-1967)					1965	1967	Air Charters of Ireland subsidiary from 1966. Operated de Havilland Heron, leased Douglas C-53D
Emerald Airways (1992-2006)		G3	JEM	GEMSTONE	1992	2006	Previously Janes Aviation (1987-1992)
Emerald European Airways		YE			1994	1995	trading name of Emerald Air (NI)
Eros Airline (UK) Ltd.					1962	1964	Operated Vickers VC.1 Viking
Euroair Transport		EZ / VC	URO / EUZ		1977	1997	
Euroceltic Airways		5Q	ECY	ECHELON	2001	2003	Operated Fokker F27, and leased Fokker 50
Eurocity Express		II	ECE		1987	1988	British Midland subsidiary. Renamed London City Airways
Eurodirect		9R	EUD		1994	1995	
EuroExec/European Executive					2003	2006	
Euroflite Ltd.					1980	1985	Registered trading name of joint Cabair and Executive Express scheduled operations. Operations taken over by McAlpine Av. Operated BAe Jetstream 31, Embraer EMB 110 Bandeirante, Cessna 404
EuroManx		3W	EMX	CATCHER	2002	2008	
European Airways					1995	1998	Operated BAe Jetstream 31 on lease
European Aviation Air Charter		E7	EAF	EUROCHARTER	1994	2008	
European Cargo		SE	URO	EURO	2020	2026	
European Skytime					2000	2012	
Euroscot Airways/Euroscot Express		MY	EUJ	SCOTAIR	1997	1999	Operated leased BAC 1-11, and leased ATR 72
Euroworld Airways					1991	1992	Renamed CityFlyer Express
Excalibur Airways		EQ	EXC	CAMELOT; EXCALIBUR	1992	1996	
Executair					1957	1961	Operated Westland Widgeon
Executive Air Transport					1960	1972	
Executive Express		EX			1975	1982	Operated Beech King Air, Cessna 421
Express Air Freight (C.I.)		LS	EXS		1975	1983	Previously Carpenter A.S. Renamed Channel Express
Express Air Services (C.I.)					1978	1980	Express Air Freight (C.I.) subsidiary. Assets merged into the parent
F
Fairflight					1948	1951	Previously Airflight. Merged operations into Air Charter
Fairflight Charters		FC			1969	1989	Renamed Fairflight Ltd. in 1980. Merged operations into Gill Aviation
Falcon Airways					1959	1961	AOC revoked due to safety concerns
Federated Air Transport					1954	1961	Federated Fruit Co. division. Operated de Havilland Dragon Rapide, Avro Anson
Fingland's Airways					1950	1952	Operated Avro Anson I
First Choice Airways		DP	AMM FCA	JETSET	1987	2008	Named Air 2000 until 2003. Merged to form Thomson Airways
Flight One					1973	1989	Operated Scottish Aviation Twin Pioneer
Flightline		B5	FLT	FLIGHTLINE	1990	2008	Contract passenger and ad hoc charters
Flightways					1948	1954	
Fly Europa					1999	2001	Operated leased Boeing 737-200
Fly Salone		5L			2015	2016	
Flybe (1979–2020)		BE	BEE	JERSEY	1979	2020	Formerly Jersey European Airways and British European Airways
Flybe (2022-2023)		BE	BEE	JERSE Y	2022	2023	
Flyglobespan/Globespan Airways		Y2	GSM	GLOBESPAN	2003	2009	
Flying Colours Airlines		MT	FCL	COLOURS	1997	2000	Merged into JMC Air
Flyjet		F7	FJE	ENVOY	2003	2007	
FlyKeen			JFK	KEENAIR	2002	2005	Keenair Charter and of Keen Airways scheduled operations trading name
FlyWhoosh		W2	WEA		2007	2007	BluArrow Aviation brand
FordAir			FOB		1996	2008	Operated BAe 146-300, Avro RJ100, Boeing 737, MD.87, One-Eleven
FR Aviation					1985	1995	Operated Beech Super King Air
G
Gatwick Heathrow Airlink					1978	1986	Trading name of British Caledonian Airways, British Airways Helicopters, and British Airports Authority joint scheduled operations (Gatwick airport-Heathrow airport helicopter shuttle). Operated Sikorsky S.61
Gaylan Air Cargo					1979	1980	
GB Airways		GT	GBL	GEEBEE	1981	1989	Trading name of Gibraltar Airways
Genair		EN	GEN	GENAIR	1982	1984	Previously air operations branch of General Relays Ltd. Operated British Caledonian Commuter
General Aviation Services					1969	1975	Generated Air Atlantique
Genesis Airways					1994	1995	Previously Prospair Air Charter. Operated leased BAe Jetstream
Gibraltar Airways		GT		GIBAIR	1931	2008	Merged into easyJet
Gill Airways		9C	GIL	GILLAIR	1970	2001	Previously Gill Aviation. Operated Fokker F28, ATR 72, ATR 42, Short 330, Short 360
Giro Aviation					1920	1964	Operated de Havilland Fox Moth, Avro Avian
Glass Eels					1970	2012	Operated Cessna 208 Caravan
Global Supply Systems		XH	GSS	JET LIFT	2002	2014	
Glosair					1970s	1980s	Operated BN.2, Cessnas
Go Fly		GO	GOE	GO FLIGHT	1998	2003	Merged into easyJet
Gold Air International					1998	2010	Executive charter airline. Established as HawkAir in 1994. Operated Bombardier Learjet 45
Grahame-White Aviation Company					1911	1919	Established as Grahame-White, Blériot & Maxim in 1911. Operated Farman III, Blériot XI
Grayson Air Services					1947	1947	Operated Airspeed Consul
Great Western & Southern Airlines					1939	1947	Merged scheduled assets into BEA. Operated de Havilland Dragon Rapide, Westland IV
Great Western Railway Air Services					1933	1934	Operated Westland IV
Gregory Air Services					1963	1965	Operated Aero Commander 500, Hawker Siddeley HS-125, Douglas DC-3. Renamed Air Gregory
Guernsey & Jersey Airways					1937	1940	Operated de Havilland Express
Guernsey Airlines Ltd.		GE	GER		1978	1989	Operated H.P. Herald, leased Shorts 330, Shorts 360, leased Vickers Viscount. Merged into Air Europe Ex
Guernsey Airways					1934	1945	Operated Saro Windhover, Saro Cloud. Absorbed into British European Airways
H
Handley Page Transport					1919	1924	Merged with British Marine Air Navigation Co Ltd, Instone Air Line and Daimler Airway to form Imperial Airways
Harvest Air					1974	1988	Operated Douglas DC-3, BN-2 Islander, Piper Aztec Assets merged into Region Airways
HawkAir					1974	1988	Executive flights. Operated Cessna 421, Piper Aztec. Merged into Gold Air International
Haywards Aviation					1970	1980	Operated BN-2 Islander, de Havilland Dove. Merged into Jersey European Airways
HC Airlines		NP	HLA	HEAVYLIFT	2001	2002	Heavylift Cargo Air brand. Operated Airbus A300, Short Belfast
HD Air			RPX	RAPEX	2007	2015	Previously BAC Aircraft
Heathrow Jet Charter			HJC	RHINOAIR	1997	1998	
Heavylift Cargo Air		NP	HLA	HEAVYLIFT	1980	2002	Previously TAC Heavylift. Rebranded HC Airlines. Operated Airbus A300, Boeing 707, Short Belfast
Highland Airways Limited					1933	1937	
Highland Airways		8H	HWY	HIWAY	1997	2010	previously Air Alba
Highland Express Airways		VY	TTN	TARTAN	1987	1987	
Hillman's Airways					1931	1935	Merged with Spartan Air Lines and United Airways Limited to form Allied British Airways
Hornton Airways					1946	1950	Operated Airspeed Consul, de Havilland Dragon Rapide, Douglas C-47A, Miles M.65 Gemini, Percival Proctor
Hot Air					1988	1989	Trading name of Baltic Airlines charter operations. Operated Vickers Viscount
Humber Airways		HM	HUA	HUMBER AIR	1968	1975	Operated BN-2 Islander
Hunting Aerosurveys					1944	1960	Founded by Percy Hunting. Merged with Hunting Geophysics to form Hunting Surveys
Hunting Air Transport					1951	1960	Previously Hunting Air Travel. Merged to form British United Airways
Hunting Air Travel					1946	1951	Operated Vickers Viking. Renamed Hunting Air Transport.
Hunting Cargo Airlines (AG)		AG	ABR	CONTRACT	1992	1998	Previously Air Bridge. Renamed Air Contractors in Ireland
Hunting-Clan Air Transport		HC			1953	1960	Registered trading name of Hunting Air Transport
Hunting Geophysics					1956	1960	Merged with Hunting Aerosurveys to form Hunting Surveys
Hunting Surveys					1960	2001	Formed by the merger of Hunting Aerosurveys with Hunting Geophysics
I
IAS Cargo Airlines		FF			1967	1979	International Aviation Services (U.K.) trading name
Imperial Airways					1924	1939	Merged with British Airways Ltd to form British Overseas Airways Corporation (BOAC)
Independent Air Transport					1954	1959	Previously Independent Air Travel. Operated Avro Anson, de Havilland Dragon Rapide, de Havilland Dove, Douglas DC-4, Vickers VC.1 Viking
Inland Flying Service					1929	1931	Renamed Portsmouth, Southsea & Isle of Wight Aviation
Inner Circle Air Lines					1935	1935	
Instone Air Line					1919	1924	Merged with British Marine Air Navigation Co Ltd, Handley Page Transport and Daimler Airway to form Imperial Airways
Instone Air Line Ltd.					1981	1995	
Inter City Airlines		QA			1981	1983	Trading name of Alidair. Operated Short 330, Vickers Viscount
Inter European Airways		IP	IEA	ASPRO	1987	1993	Merged into Airtours International
Interflight					1985	2018	Established as Berrad Aviation in 1974. Operated BAe 125, Learjet 35
Interline					1994	1996	Previously Eagle Aviation (UK). Operated Short 330, and Jetstream 31
International Air Charter					1969	1975	Operated Piper Aztec
International Air Freight					1937	1938	Operated Curtiss T-32 Condor II
International Airways					1946	1950	Operated Airspeed Consul, Avro Anson, de Havilland Dragon Rapide
Intra Airways		JY			1969	1979	Assets merged to form Jersey European Airways
Invicta Air Cargo				INDIA MIKE	1969	1970	Previously Invicta Airways (1969) Ltd. Succeeded by Invicta International Airlines. Operated Douglas C-54B
Invicta Airways					1965	1969	Succeeded by Invicta International Airlines
Invicta International Airlines		IM		INVICTA	1971	1982	
Irelfly					1966	1966	Operated Douglas C-47B
Island Air Charters (UK)					1946	1950	Operated de Havilland Dragon Rapide. Merged into Air Transport Charter
Island Air Services					1946	1957	Operated de Havilland Dragon Rapide
Isle of Man Air Services					1937	1947	
J
J&J Air Charter/Jayline					1990	1995	Operated EMB-110 Bandeirante
J-MAX					2000s	2000s	Operated Hawker 800
Janes Aviation (1987-1992)					1987	1992	Operated Douglas DC-3, Dart Herald, Short 330. Renamed Emerald Airways
Janes Aviation (2006-2010)			JAN	JANES	2008	2010	Operated Hawker Siddeley HS 748
Janus Airways					1983	1986	Operated Vickers Viscount, Dart Herald. Merged operations into Euroair
Jersey Airlines		JY			1948	1963	Airlines (Jersey) Ltd. trading name. Merged to form British United (C.I.) Airways
Jersey Airways					1933	1945	Assets merged into British European Airways
Jetstream Express		JX	JXT	VANNIN	2007	2007	Trading name of Jetstream Executive Travel scheduled operations
jetXtra.com					2012	2017	Virtual airline
JF Airlines (Jersey Ferry Airlines)					1971	1973	Operated BN-2 Islander, de Havilland Heron, Scottish Aviation Twin Pioneer Trading name of JF Airlines
JMC Air		MT	JMC	TOPJET	2000	2003	Renamed Thomas Cook Airlines
Jota Aviation			ENZ	ENZO	2009	2022	Sometimes not recorded as a true airline company
K
Kay Rings					1960	1961	Operations transferred to Trans World Leasing
Kearsley Airways					1947	1950	Operated Douglas C-47B. Halted airline-type operations.
Keenair Charter & Keen Airways		5Q	JKF	KEENAIR	1968	2005	Operated Embraer Bandeirante. Renamed Keen Airways. Merged operations into A2B Airways
Kemps Aerial Survey					1964	1969	Operated Avro Anson, Reid and Sigrist R.S.4 single aircraft built
Kestrel Airways/					1971	1972	Traded as Kestrel International. Operated Douglas DC-3, Vickers Viscount.
KLM uk		UK	UKA	UKAY	1998	2003	Merged into Dutch KLM Cityhopper
Knightway Air Charter/Knight Air			KNT		1994	1997	Operated Cessna 550 Citation II, Embraer Bandeirante, and Cessna 421
Kondair Cargo					1985	1989	Operated Britten-Norman Trislander, leased Fokker F27
L
Laker Airways		GK	LKR	LAKER	1966	1982	
Lakeside Aviation			LKS		1991	1993	Operated BAe Jetstream 31 in scheduled operations traded as Northwest Air
Lancashire Aircraft Corporation					1946	1958	Merged into Silver City Airways-Northern Division.
Lanzair (C.I.) Ltd.					1973	1976	Operated Lockheed L-649 Constellation
Lease Air					1973	1982	Merged into Genair Ltd.
LeCocq's Airlink					1999	2003	Renamed Rockhopper Airlines. Operated BN-2 Islander, Trislander
Leisure International Airways		MV	UKL	LEISURE	1993	1998	Merged into Air 2000
Lennard Aviation					1964	1966	Operated Piper Aztec, Piper Twin Comanche, BN-2 Islander
Links Air			LNQ	FASTLINK	1983	2016	
Lloyd International Airways		LW			1961	1972	
Loch Lomond Seaplanes					2004	2025	Ceased operations
London Aero and Motor Services-LAMS					1946	1947	Operated Handley Page Halifax
London City Airways		II	LCY	STOL	1986	1990	Previously Eurocity Express. Merged into parent airline British Midland
London European Airways		UQ	LON	EUROPEAN	1985	1991	Renamed Ryanair Europe 1988-1989
London Flight Centre (Stansted)					1983	2001	Sold scheduled operations assets to Links Air in 2007
London, Scottish & Provincial Airways					1934	1934	Operated Airspeed Courier 1934 crash.
Love Air		4J	LOV	LOVEAIR	1990	2001	Trading name of London Flight Centre charter operations. Operated BAe Jetstream 31 and various Piper Navajos
Lundy & Atlantic Air Services					1936	1936	Operated Short Scion
Luton Airways					1958	1959	Operated DH.89 de Havilland Dragon Rapide
Luxury Air Tours					1932	1933	Operated de Havilland Dragon
LyddAir			STD		2002	2018	
Lynton Aviation			LYN	LYNTON	1987	2003	Established as Magec Aviation in 1985. Operated Eurocopter AS355 Écureuil 2, BAe 125, Mitsubishi MU-300 Diamond
M
Macair					1995	1995	
Macedonian Aviation					1972	1974	Operated Douglas DC-3, de Havilland Dove
Maersk Air UK		VB	MSK	BLUESTAR	1993	2004	Renamed in 2003 Duo Airways
Magec Aviation			MGC	MAGEC	1982	1999	Operated BAe 125, Falcon 900. Merged into Lynton Aviation
Maitland Drewery					1959	1961	Previously Maitland Air Charters. Operated Aero Ae-45, Vickers Viscount, Vickers VC.1 Viking
Malinair		WG	MAK	MALIN	1985	1987	
Manchester Aviation					1921	1923	Operated Airco DH.6
Mannin Airways					1948	1950	Operated de Havilland Dragon Rapide
Manx Airlines (1947–1958)					1947	1958	Previously Manx Air Charters. Merged into Silver City Airways-Northern Division
Manx Airlines (1982-2002)		JE	MNX	MANX	1982	2002	
Manx2		NM	BPS		2006	2012	
Markoss Aviation			MKO		2001	2008	Operated BAe 125, BAe 125 800, Bombardier CRJ200
Martini Airfreight Services			INI		1996	1999	Operated Cessna Grand Caravan. Renamed Benair
Mayflower Air Services					1961	1964	Operated de Havilland Dragon Rapide Merged into British Westpoint Airlines
Mediterranean Express			MEE		1987	1988	Operated BAC 1-11
Melba Airways					1949	1952	Operated Airspeed Consul, de Havilland Dove, de Havilland Dragon Rapide
Mercury Airlines					1960	1964	Previously Overseas Air Transport (Jersey). Operated Douglas DC-3, de Havilland Heron Assets sold to British Midland
Meredith Air Transport					1952	1953	Operated a single Douglas DC-3. Renamed African Air Safaris
Meridian Airmaps					1952	1989	Aerial survey. Went in liquidation. Operated Avro Anson, Miles Aerovan
Merlin Air Services					1952	1989	Operated Cessna Caravan
Merlot International Aviation					1972	1974	Operated BAe 125, Agusta-Bell 206
Metropolitan Air Movements					1960	1964	Operated de Havilland Heron, de Havilland Dove, de Havilland Dragonfly
Metropolitan Airways					1982	1985	Operated BN-2 Islander, DHC-6 Twin Otter, Short 330
Mid-Fly					1964	1966	Operated de Havilland Dragon Rapide, Piper Aztec, Piper Tri-Pacer, Piper Colt, Piper Cherokee
Midland Air Cargo					1970	1973	Operated Bristol Freighter
Midland & Scottish Air Ferries					1933	1934	Scotland's first airline
MK Airlines/MK Air Cargo		7G	BGB	BRITISH GLOBAL	1991	2010	
Modern Transport					1949	1950	Operated de Havilland Dragon Rapide
Monarch Airlines		ZB	MON	MONARCH	1967	2017	Entered administration
Morton Air Services					1946	1968	Merged to form British United Island Airways
Mossair					1975	1980	Operated de Havilland Dove
Murray Chown Aviation					1951	1953	Operated de Havilland Dragon Rapide, Percival Proctor. Sold scheduled operations to Cambrian Air Services.
MyTravel Airways		VZ	MYT	KESTREL	2002	2008	Previously Airtours International. Merged into Thomas Cook Airlines
MyTravelLite Airlines		VZ	MYL	MY LITE	2002	2008	Reintegrated into its parent airline MyTravel Airways and by consequence merged into Thomas Cook Airlines
N
National Commuter Airways					1987	1989	Trading name of Airmore Ltd./Prop. Navigations scheduled operations. Operated Short 330, Embraer Bandeirante, Britten-Norman Islander, Beech King Air, Beech Baron
Newman Airways					1945	1951	Operated de Havilland Dragon Rapide
Newquay Air					1993	1998	
Nexus Airlines					2005	2005	
Nightflight					1980	1984	Operated Beechcraft 99, Piper PA-31
Norfolk Airways					1950	1970	Operated Piper Aztec. Merged with Anglian Air Charter and Rig Air to form Air Anglia
North Eastern Airways					1935	1947	Operated Airspeed Envoy, de Havilland Dragon Rapide. Assets taken over by BEA.
North Sea Aerial & General Transport Company					1919	1933	Established as North Sea Aerial Navigation Company. Operated Blackburn Segrave, Blackburn Kangaroo
North Sea Air Transport					1946	1952	Operated Avro Anson, de Havilland Dragon Rapide, Lockheed 12A, Lockheed 14
North-South Airlines					1959	1962	
North-West Airlines (IoM)					1949	1951	Operated Miles Aerovan, de Havilland Dragon Rapide, Douglas C-47A
Northair		NT			1964	1979	Operated Piper Aztec, Piper Twin Comanche Acquired by Capital Airlines (UK)
Northeast Airlines		NS		NORJET	1970	1972	Previously BKS Air Transport. Merged into British Airways Regional Division-Northeast
Northern & Scottish Airways					1934	1937	Merged to form Scottish Airways
Northern Air Charter					1947	1948	Operated Airspeed Consul, de Havilland Dragon Rapide
Northern Air Lines					1924	1925	Operated Airco DH.9, de Havilland DH.50
Northern Air Transport					1929	1932	Founded by John Leeming. Operated Avro 504
Northern Airlines (UK)			TLR		1991	1994	Operated BN-2 Islander
Northern Aviation					2004	2009	Operated Beech Super King Air, Piper Seneca, Cessna Golden Eagle
Northern Executive Aviation			NEX	NEATAX	1962	2013	Operated Beech Super King Air, BN-2 Islander, Falcon 900, Learjet 35, Piper Aztec, Piper Twin Comanche
Norwegian Air UK		DI	NRS	RED NOSE	2017	2020	Assets merged into parent Norwegian Air Shuttle of Norway
Novair International Airways		EN	NGK	STARJET	1988	1990	Previously Cal Air International
O
Olley Air Service					1934	1953	Operated de Havilland Dragon Rapide, de Havilland Dove. Merged operations into Morton Air Services
Orient Air					1991	1994	Previously AA Aviation Services
Orion Airways Ltd.					1957	1960	Operated Vickers VC.1 Viking
Orion Airways		KG	ORN	ORION	1980	1989	Merged into Britannia Airways
OurJet					2003	2003	Operated BAe 125
Overseas Aviation (C.I.) Ltd.					1958	1961	Operated Canadair C-4 Argonaut, Vickers VC.1 Viking
Oxford Aero Charter (Oxaero)					1998	2001	Operated Cessna Citation, Piper Navajo Chieftain
P
Palmair European					1993	2010	Previously Palmair
Paramount Airways		QJ	PAT	PARAMOUNT	1987	1989	
Patrick Aviation					1947	1953	Previously Patrick-Duval Aviation
Payloads (Charter) Co.					1946	1948	Operated Douglas DC3
Peach Air		KG	KGC	GOLDCREST	1997	1998	Assets merged into JMC Air
Pegasus Airlines					1959	1961	Operated Vickers VC.1 Viking
Pelican Air Transport					1978	1981	Operated Boeing 707
Peregrine Air Services		PJ	PSS		1969	1989	Operated BAe Jetstream 31, Grumman Gulfstream I, Cessna 404. Transferred scheduled operations to Aberdeen Airways (1989)
Peters' Aviation		NP			1969	1979	Operated de Havilland Heron, Piper Cherokee. Merged into Air Anglia
Platinum Air Charter Executive 2000/Platinum Air 2000			PLM	PLATINUM EXEC	2000	2001	Traded as Platinum Air 2000. Operated BAe Jetstream 31, Beech Super King Air, Cessna Citation II
Polar Airways					1982	1983	Operated leased Vickers Viscounts serie 800
Polyfoto Air Taxi Services					1963	1966	Operated Piper Apache, Piper Twin Comanche, Cessna Skylark
Portsmouth, Southsea & Isle of Wight Aviation					1932	1939	Previously Inland Flying Service. Renamed Portsmouth Aviation.
Prime Airlines			PRM	PRIME AIR	2001	2002	Trading name of Heavylift Cargo Air passenger operations
Princess Air		8Q	PRN	WHISPERJET	1990	1991	Short lived charter airline operating BAe 146
Progressive Airways					1970	1971	Operated de Havilland Dove, de Havilland Heron
Prospair Air Charter					1990	1994	Renamed Genesis Airways
Provincial Airways					1933	1935	
Q
Quest Airlines					2004	2005	Operated BAe Jetstream 31
R
Railway Air Services					1934	1947	Scheduled assets merged into British European Airways
Redcoat Air Cargo		RY			1977	1982	
Reed Aviation					1996	2006	Operated leased HS 748
Region Air					1988	1991	
Rig-Air					1965	1970	Operated Douglas C-47. Merged to form Air Anglia
RM Aviation			RMN		1974	1999	Operated Beech King Air, Cessna Citation V
Rockhopper Airlines				BLUE ISLAND	2003	2006	Previously LeCocq's Airlink. Renamed Blue Islands.
Ryburn Air					1974	1979	Operated Hughes 369, Partenavia P.68
S
Sagittair					1970	1972	Operated Beech D18S, AW.660 Argosy
Sandown and Shanklin Flying Services					1935	1936	Founded by Ernest Byrne. Acquired Shanklin Flying Services
Scillonia Airways					1965	1969	Seasonal services. Operated de Havilland Dragon Rapide
Scillonian Air Services					1963	1964	Operated Aero Commander 500
Scimitar Airlines		JA			1975	1980	
ScotAirways		CB	SAY		1999	2007	Trading name of Suckling Airways
Scottish Airlines					1946	1960	Also based in Prestwick
Scottish Airways					1937	1947	Merged scheduled operations into British European Airways
Scottish European Airways		WW	SEU		1988	1990	Operated HS 748
Securicor Express					1983	1990	Operated Beech Baron, Dart Herald, Piper Navajo Chieftain. Renamed Skyguard
SelectAir					2004	2006	Operated Piper Chieftain
Severn Airways					1975	1975	Operated de Havilland Dove
SFC Air Taxis					1992	1998	Operated Piper Seneca
Shanklin Flying Services					1992	1998	Acquired by Sandown and Shanklin Flying Services. Operated Spartan Cruiser
Shortcut Airlines					1958	1960	Operated Bristol Freighter
Silver City Airways		SS			1946	1962	In 1957 operations split into three Divisions. Merged into British United Airways
Silver City Airways Ltd.					1973	1973	Registered trading name of Air Holdings (Sales) operations. Operated Vickers Vanguard
Silverjet		Y7	SLR	SILVERJET	2007	2008	
Site Aviation					1973	1974	Operated leased Vickers Viscount, Douglas DC3
Sivewright Airways					1946	1951	Operated Avro Anson, de Havilland Dragon Rapide, Douglas DC-3, Miles Aerovan, Miles Gemini
Sky Charters					1962	1965	Operated de Havilland Dove
Sky-Trek Airlines		5Q	STD		1997	2000	Atlantic Bridge Aviation division
Skydrift Air Charter			SDL		2004	2010	Operated Embraer Bandeirante, Piper Aztec, Piper Navajo Chieftain
Skyflight					1948	1949	Operated HP.70 Halifax
Skyrover					1989	1991	Operated Short 330, EMB-110 Bandeirante
Skysouth			SDL		2006	2009	Trading name of Skydrift Air Charter scheduled operations
Skytravel					1946	1947	
Skyways Cargo					1975	1980	Previously Air Freight
Skyways Coach-Air Limited		SX			1958	1971	Formed out of Skyways of London/Skyways Limited “Coach-Air” operations
Skyways International		SY			1971	1973	Changed name to Dan-Air Skyways, merged into Dan-Air
Skyways Limited/Skyways of London					1950	1962	Merged into Euravia
Solair Flying Services					1962	1964	Operated de Havilland Dragon Rapide
Somerton Airways Ltd.					1946	1951	Reformed as Somerton Airways (Cowes) Ltd. in 1950. Operated Percival Proctor, Austers, de Havilland Dragon Rapide
South Coast Airways					1996	2001	
South East Air					1985	1988	
South West Aviation		UX			1966	1972	
Southampton Air Services					1946	1946	Operated Douglas DC-2
Southern Aircraft					1946	1946	Operated Avro Anson, de Havilland Dragon Rapide
Southern Airways Ltd					1936	1939	
Southern International Air Transport		CS			1976	1981	Operated Vickers Viscount
Spacegrand Aviation Services					1979	1985	Operated DHC-6 Twin Otter. Merged into Jersey European Airways
Spartan Air Lines					1933	1935	Merged with United Airways Limited to form British Airways Ltd
Starways					1949	1964	Acquired by British Eagle and renamed British Eagle (Liverpool)
Stramsway					1963	1965	Depending on the type of operation it branded as South Coast Air Charter, South Coast Air Services, South Coast Air Taxis. Operated Douglas DC-3, DH.114.
Strathallan Air Services (Strathair)					1962	1970	Operated Douglas C-47B Renamed Cirrus Aviation
Streamline Aviation			SSW	STREAMLINE	1991	2003	Operated Short 330, Short 360. Merged into Emerald Airways
Suckling Airways		CB	SAY	SUCKLING	1986	2013	Previously Suckling Aviation. Merged into Loganair
Surf Air Europe			FLJ		2017	2018	USA-based Surf Air subsidiary. Operated Embraer Phenom 300
Surrey Flying Services					1951	1952	Reformed after WWII. Merged into Air Charter.
Swiss Universal Air Charter					1957	1961	Operated leased Vickers Viking
Synergy Aviation			SYG	SYNERGY	2004	2023	Refounded as Ascend Airways
T
TAC Heavylift		NP	HLA	HEAVYLIFT	1978	1980	Operated Short Belfast Renamed Heavylift Cargo Air
TEA UK					1989	1991	TEA (Belgium) subsidiary
Tempair International Airlines					1973	1976	
Thomas Cook Airlines		MT	TCX	THOMAS COOK	2003	2019	Previously JMC Airlines
Thomsonfly		BY	TOM		2004	2008	Merged to form Thomson Airways
Thurston Aviation		HZ			1985	1990	Operated as Tal-Air Piper Navajo, Beech Super King Air, Piper Apache, Percival Prentice
Tippers Air Transport					1964	1968	Operated Avro Anson
TopFlight Aviation					1984	1986	Previously Air Oxford. Operated Douglas DC-3, DH.114.
Tradair					1958	1962	Merged into Channel Airways
Tradewinds Airways		IK	IKA	TRADEWINDS	1969	1990	Founded as BOBWOOD
Transair					1947	1960	Merged to form British United Airways (BUA)
Trans European Aviation					1959	1962	Rebranded Lockheed L.049 operations Trans European Airways in 1961-1962
Transglobe Airways					1965	1968	Previously Air Links
TAC-Transmeridian Air Cargo		KK		TRANSMERIDIAN	1970	1979	Previously Trans Meridian Flying Services, and Trans Meridian (London). Merged to form British Cargo Airlines
Trans Meridian Flying Services					1962	1968	Operated Canadair CL-44, Douglas DC-6, Douglas DC-7. Renamed Trans Meridian (London), and lately TAC-Transmeridian Air Cargo.
Trans World Charter					1948	1951	Operated Vickers VC.1 Viking. Merged into Crewsair.
Travel City Direct (TCD)					2005	2008	Operated leased Boeing 747. Transformed in a tour operator.
Treffield International Airways					1965	1967	Previously Treffield Aviation.
Trent Valley Aviation					1948	1951	Operated Douglas DC-3
Tyler Aviation					1970	1970	Operated de Havilland Dove, de Havilland Heron
Tyne Tees Airways					1960	1964	Previously Tyne Tees Air Charter. Operated de Havilland Dove, de Havilland Dragon Rapide
U
UK International Airlines		IH	UKI	MAGENTA	2007	2007	
Ulster Air Transport					1968	1970	Traded as Air Ulster. Operated Douglas C-47A, Vickers Viscount
Ulster Aviation					1946	1949	Merged to form North-West Airlines (IoM)
Union Air Services					1946	1947	Operated HP.70 Halifax. Merged operations into Bond Air Services.
United Airways Limited					1934	1935	
V
Varsity Express					2010	2010	
Venture Airways		CD	ACK		1984	1984	Trading name of Air Commuter in 1984. Operated HS 748
Veritair					1982	2008	
Vernair		VC	ATS		1967	1986	Operated Short Skyvan
Virgin Atlantic Little Red		VS	VIR	VIRGIN	2013	2015	
Virgin Express					1984	1996	Trading name of Virgin Atlantic Airways Europe to London scheduled operations
Virgin Sun Airlines		V2	VIR	VIRGIN	1999	2001	Operations sold to First Choice Holidays
W
Waves					2017	2018	
Welsh Airways					1985	1988	Operated Partenavia P.68
West Coast Air Services					1937	1947	Merged scheduled assets into British European Airways
Westair International					1988	1989	Operated Dart Herald
Western Airways				SHOVEL	1938	1952	Previously Norman Edgar (Western Airways). Continued non-airline operations until 1978
Western Aviation (UK)					1928	1928	Operated Avro 504
Westminster Airways					1946	1949	
Westpoint Aviation					1961	1962	Previously F. & J. Mann Airways. Operated Douglas DC-3 Renamed British Westpoint Airlines.
Westward Airways					1971	2009	
Wight Airlines					2006	2006	Operated Piper Navajo
William Dempster					1948	1953	Operated Avro Tudor
Willow Air			WLO	WILLOWAIR	1992	1996	Operated Short 330, Embraer Bandeirante, Trislander. Merged into Streamline Aviation
Wolverhampton Aviation					1950	1954	Joint operations with Derby Aviation from 18 July 1953. Operated Miles Gemini, Miles Hawk Trainer, de Havilland Dragon Rapide. Assets merged into Derby Aviation
World Air Freight					1947	1950	Operated Handley Page Halifax
World Wide Aviation					1960	1961	Operated Douglas C-54A Skymaster.
World Airlines		W2	WRD	ECLIPSE	1996	1996	
X
XL Airways UK		JN	XLA	EXPO	1994	2008	Previously Sabre Airways and Excel Airways
Y
Yeadon Aviation					1955	1958	
Yeoward Line Aviation					1972	1982	Subsidiary of Yeoward Brothers Ltd. Operated Piper Seneca
Yorkshire European Airways					1992	1993	Previously Booth Air. Operated leased Embraer Bandeirante
Z
Zoom Airlines Limited		ZX	UKZ	FLYZOOM	2007	2008	

== See also ==
- List of airlines of the United Kingdom
- List of airports in the United Kingdom and the British Crown Dependencies
