= Scimitar Airlines =

British cargo airline

| IATA | ICAO | Call sign |
|---|---|---|
| JA | — | — |
- Founded: 28 January 1975 (as Gullcroft)
- Commenced operations: November 1975 (as Scimitar Airlines)
- Ceased operations: 1976 (own operations), 1980 (operations by third parties)
- Hubs: Gatwick Airport
- Fleet size: See Fleet below
- Headquarters: Lowfield Heath

Scimitar Airlines was a British charter airline between 1975 and 1980 with a head office in Lowfield Heath on the south perimeter of Gatwick Airport. It briefly operated cargo charters to West and Central Africa and the Middle East before financial problems caused it to cease flyingone year later.

== History ==
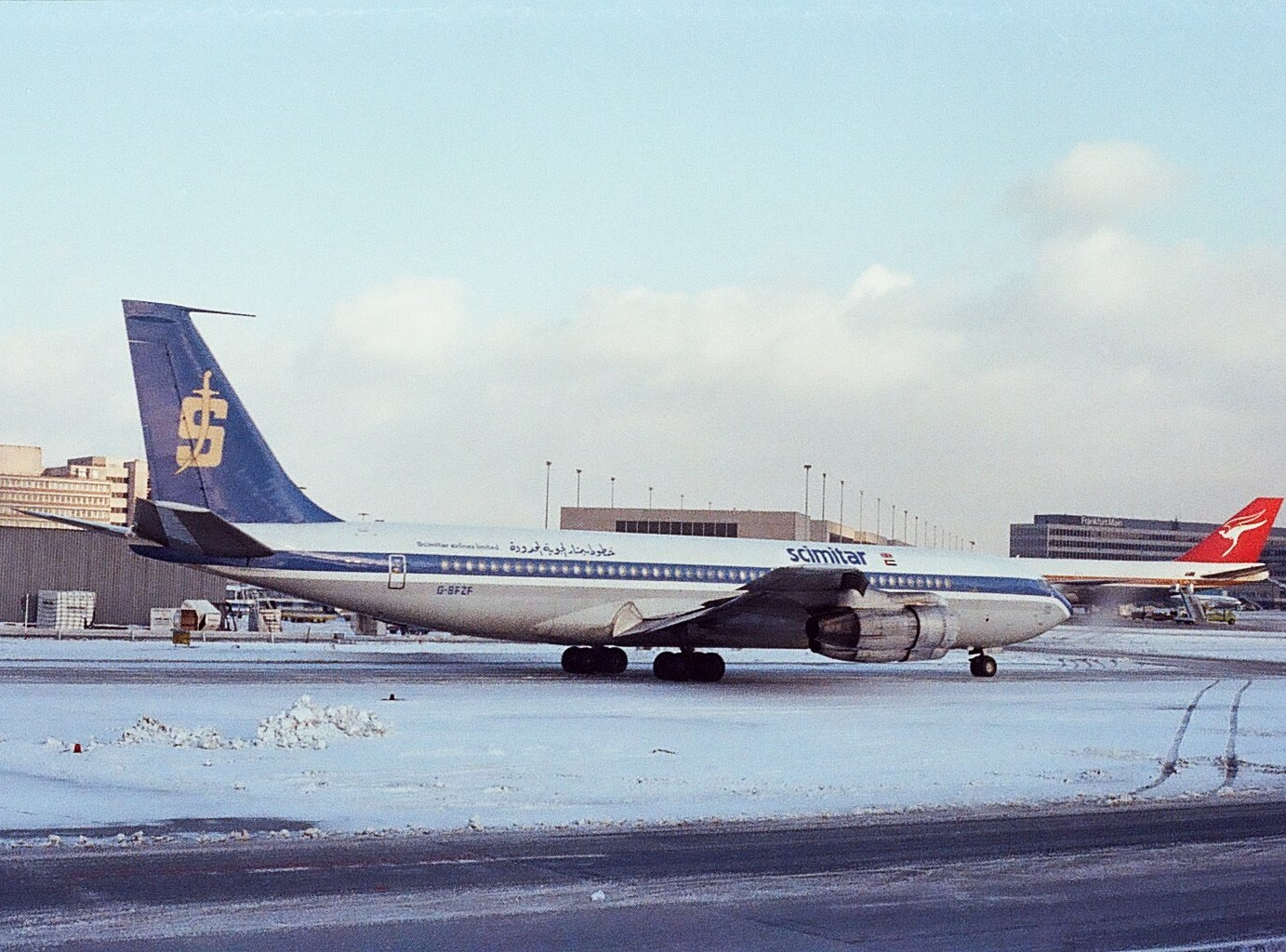
Boeing 707-321C at Frankfurt Airport in 1979

The company was formed on 28 January 1975 as Gullcroft Ltd. by M.A. "Guy" Guinane, managing director of British Caledonian from 1970 to 1974. Amongst the new company’s shareholders were Sedgewick Forbes Holdings and Viking Airfreight. With a change of name to Scimitar Airlines Ltd. the airline applied for a cargo charter licence, against objections from British Caledonian and other British cargo airlines such as Transmeridian Air Cargo and Tradewinds Airways. The Civil Aviation Authority held a public hearing into the application.

The airline lease-purchased two second-hand Boeing 707s in a convertible passenger/cargo configuration to start freight operations. Own operations were few and limited to less than a year. The two 707s were wet-leased to IAS Cargo Airlines (later British Cargo Airlines) and in August 1979 Scimitar considered applying for a licence to carry passengers.

In 1980 the company licences were withdrawn by the Civil Aviation Authority because the Government of the day required that the carrier be majority British owned (at that time it was owned by two Saudi Arabian brothers). In 1981 it was hoped that the company could be re-financed and to restart operations. Scimitar was eventually declared bankrupt on December 23, 1981, it went into liquidation in early 1982 before being finally dissolved in November 1988.

== See also ==
- List of defunct airlines of the United Kingdom
