= Cello Aviation =

IATA	ICAO	Call sign
—	CLJ	CELLOJET
- Founded: 2009 (as Altavia Jet Services)
- Ceased operations: 12 October 2018
- Hubs: Birmingham Airport
- Fleet size: 2
- Parent company: Gill Group
- Headquarters: Birmingham, United Kingdom
- Website: flycello.com

Cello Aviation was a British private charter airline headquartered at Birmingham Airport. It was established as Altavia Jet Services in 2009 and was renamed Cello Aviation in July 2010 starting operations upon receiving Type A OL and AOC from the UK CAA.

== History ==
On 1 September 2009, an application for a Civil Aviation Authority Type A Operating Licence was made by Gill Airways Ltd, of Birmingham. However, in early 2010, the company rebranded Cello Aviation. It commenced operations with a purchased and refurbished BAe 146–200 aircraft fitted with 46 all business class seats, registration G-RAJJ. On 12 October 2018, Cello Aviation announced it had ceased trading with immediate effect. The airline had seen losses amounting to as much as £302,000 prior to March 2017 and £961,000 during the previous year. Cello Aviation could not obtain additional funding and filed for bankruptcy in October 2018, ceasing all trading with immediate effect. All contracts the airline had were axed.

== Operations ==
The airline primarily operated private and VIP charters with two specially configured aircraft. It also operated wet lease and full charter flights with two Boeing 737 and an Avro RJ100 aircraft. The airline's passengers have included Queen Elizabeth II, who flew to Dublin as part of her 2011 visit to the Republic of Ireland.

== Fleet ==
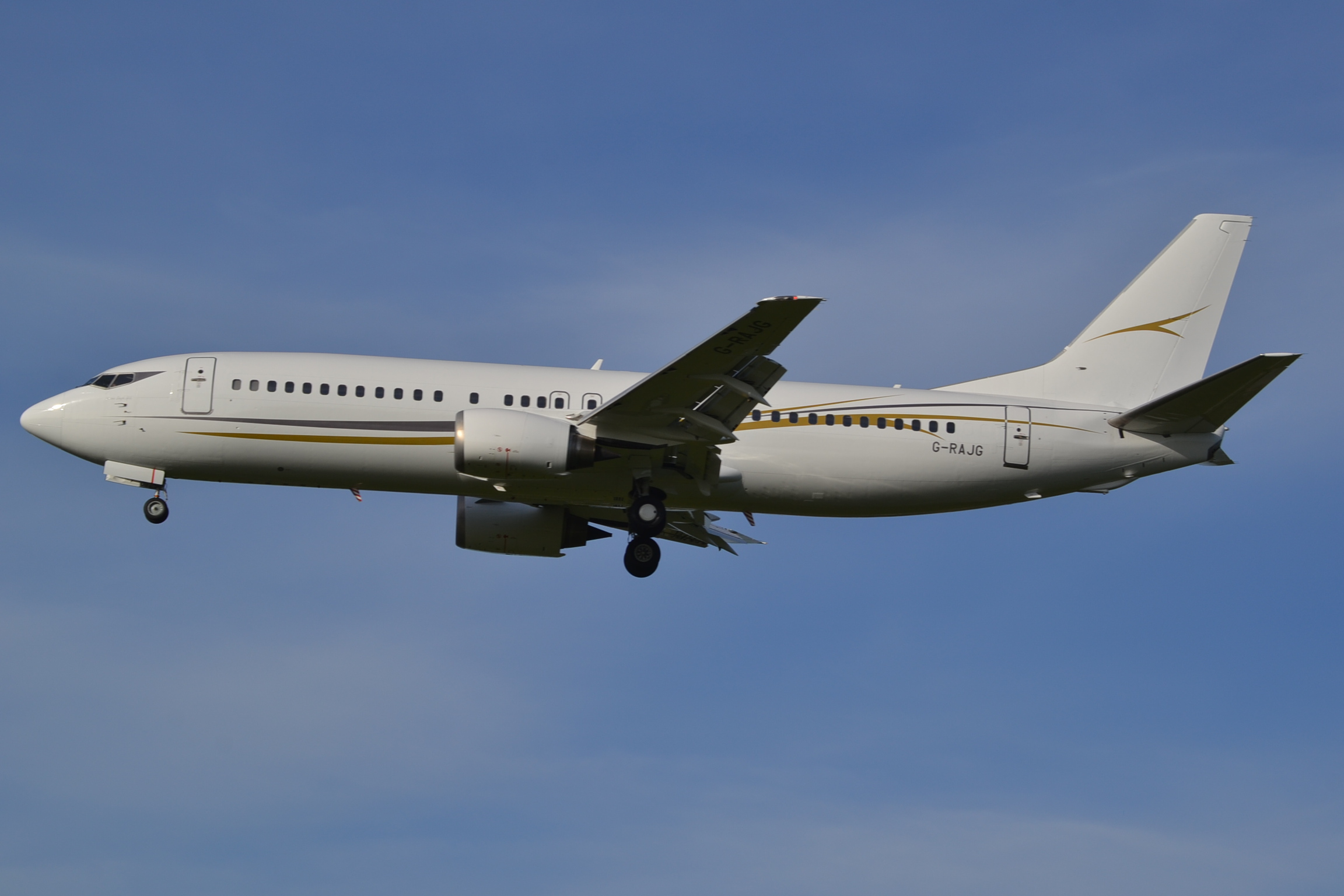
Cello Aviation Boeing 737-400

As of February 2018, the Cello Aviation fleet consisted of the following aircraft:

Cello Aviation fleet
Aircraft	In Service	Orders	Passengers			Notes
Aircraft	In Service	Orders	C	Y	Total	Notes
Avro RJ100	1	—	—	97	97	
Boeing 737-300	1	—	—	148	148	
Total	2	—				

=== Former fleet ===
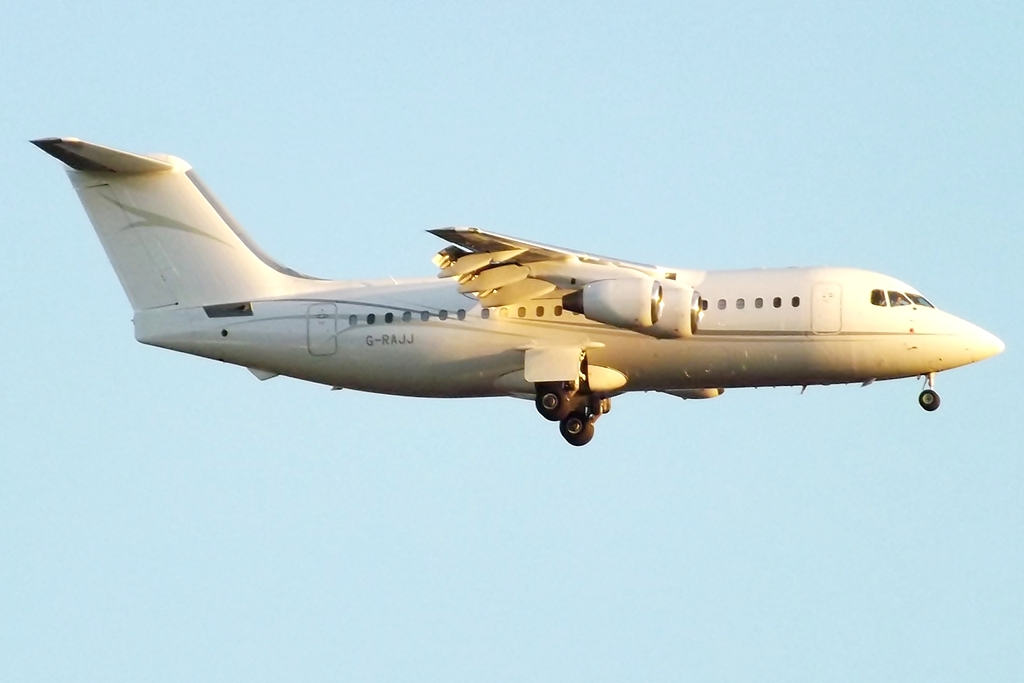
Cello Aviation BAe 146-200

Previously, Cello Aviation also operated the following aircraft:

Retired Cello Aviation aircraft
Aircraft	In fleet	Entry year	Exit year
Avro RJ85	1	2013	2015
Boeing 737-400	1	2015	2016
BAe 146-200	1	2009	2018

== See also ==
- List of defunct airlines of the United Kingdom
