= Flykeen Airways =

British regional airline

Keen Airways was a regional airline based in Blackpool, United Kingdom. It operated charter as well as scheduled services from its main base at Blackpool International Airport. The ICAO code was JFK, the call sign KEENAIR.

== History ==
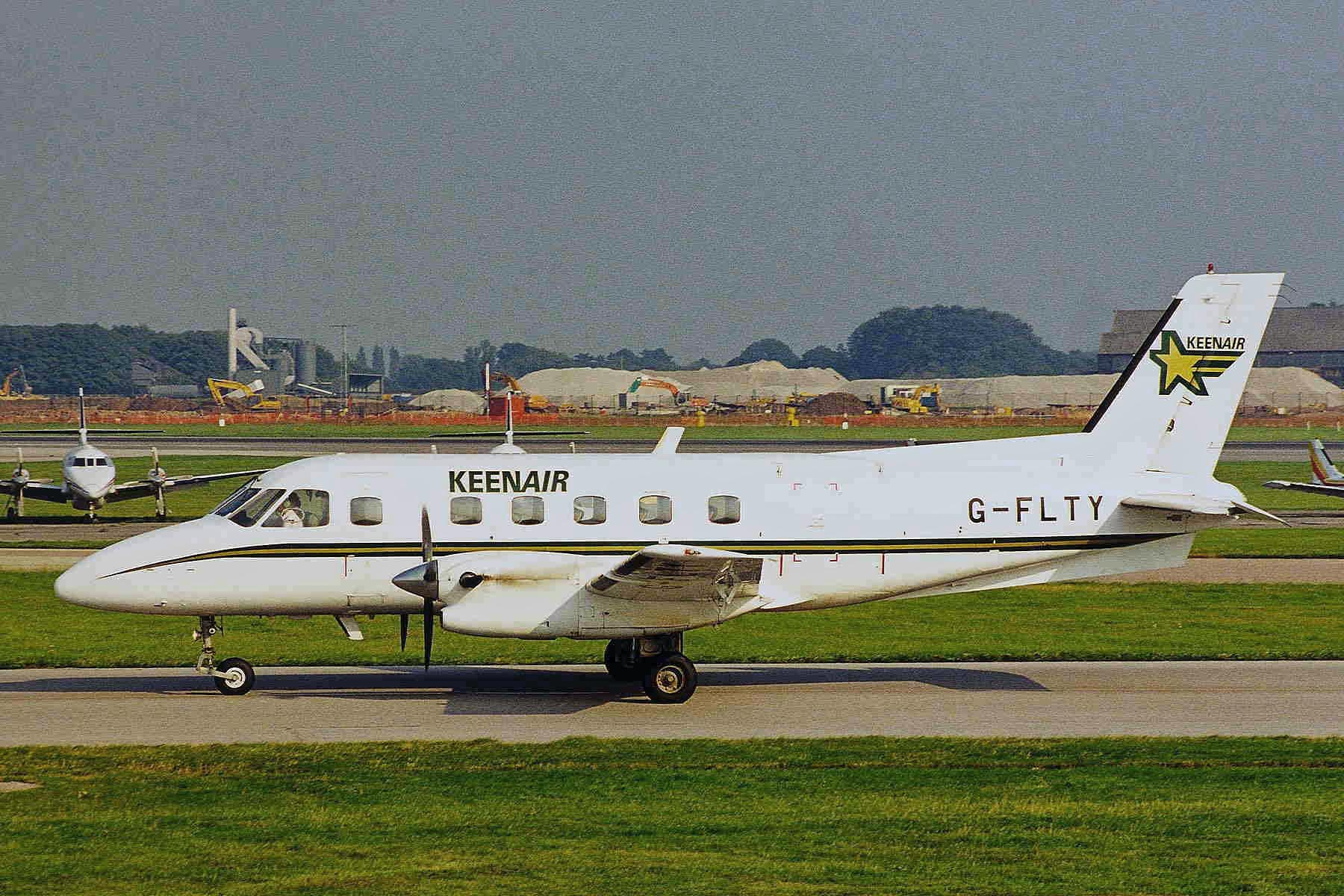
Embraer EMB 110P1 Bandeirante at Manchester, 1999

The company was established on 17 September 1968 as Keenair Charter. Flight operations started in the following month, including training, aerial photography and pleasure flying. In the early 1970s, the company began acquiring Piper Aztecs to expand its activities. On occasions Keenair also periodically undertook the Nuclear Power Group’s shuttle between Liverpool and Dounreay. The company also ran Caernarfon Aerodrome in North Wales and undertook aircraft maintenance.

Late in 1996, Keenair began leasing Trislanders to fly night-time freight and newspaper services, across the Irish Sea. Following an increase in both freight and passenger charter work, which included crew movements for various airlines, an Embraer EMB 110P1 Bandeirante was leased in February 1998, followed by a second in 1999. Twice-weekly scheduled services between Liverpool and Cork, operated by the Bandeirantes, commenced on May 19, 2000. In September 2002, both aircraft were re-based at Blackpool and later registered in the name of Keen Airways.

Following the uncertainty created by the demise of both Comed Aviation and Platinum on the Blackpool-Isle of Man route, Keenair stepped in under the trading name FlyKeen to take over scheduled services from November 22, 2002, extended to Belfast (City) from May 2003.

After the death of Jim Keen and the acquisition of Keenair Charter by Peter Whitehead, the charter side of the business was liquidated late in October 2003. In preparation for the changeover, in September 2003, Keenair’s two Embraer Bandeirantes were transferred to Blackpool for operation by the actual AOC holder, Keen Airways, which had been formed in February 2003. As FlyKeen, the company continued scheduled services across the Irish Sea to the Isle of Man and Belfast until January 2005, when the newly created A2B Airways took over its routes and assets.

== See also ==
- List of defunct airlines of the United Kingdom
