= London European Airways =

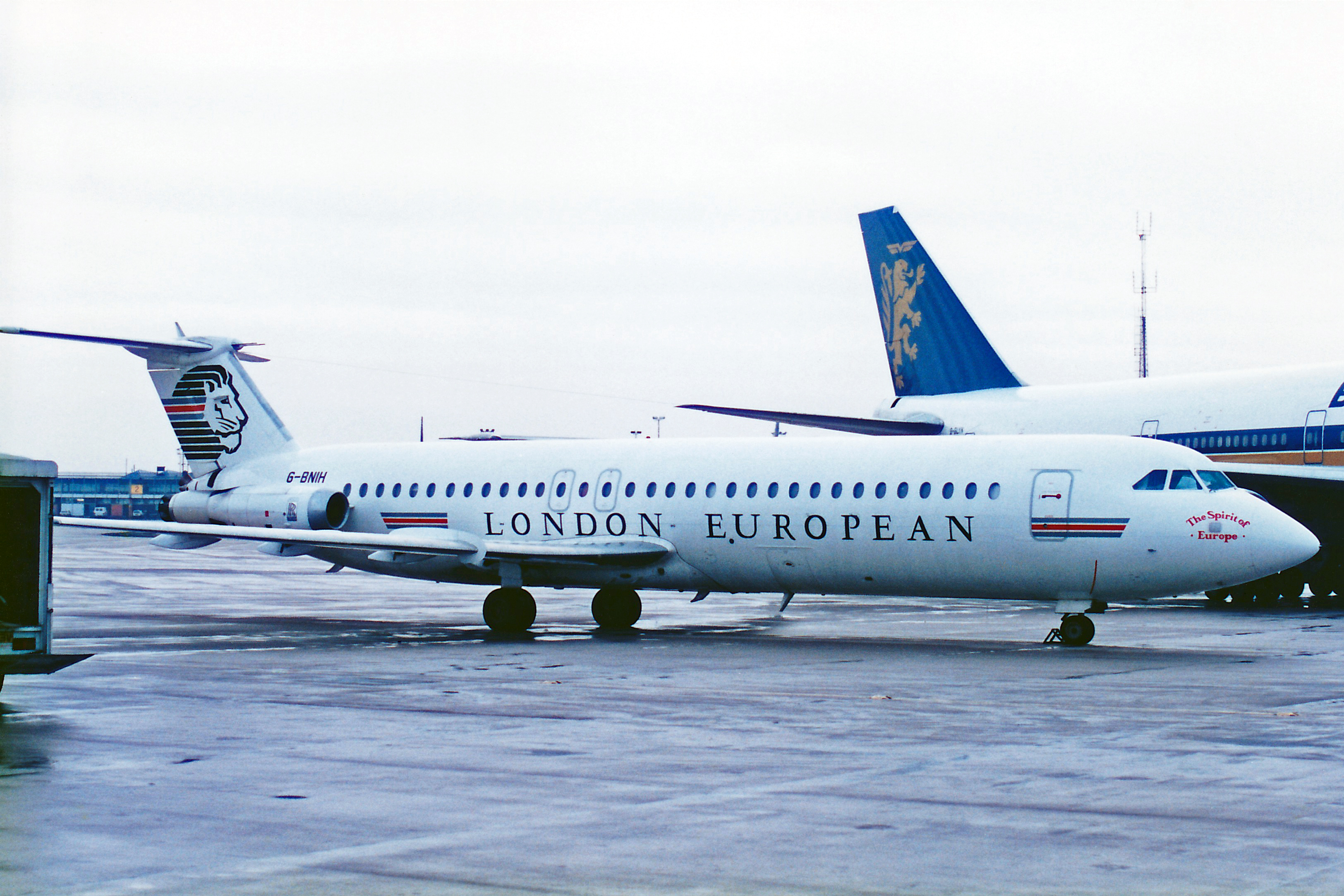
- BAC One-Eleven 500 in 1988
- Founded: 1984
- Commenced operations: February 1985
- Ceased operations: May 1991
- Hubs: Luton Airport
- Fleet size: 4
- Destinations: 3
- Parent company: Ryanair (1986-1990)

London European Airways plc was a British airline based at Luton Airport that operated services from the United Kingdom to Amsterdam and Brussels. It was taken over by Ryanair in 1986 and operated as Ryanair Europe for a couple of years.

== History ==
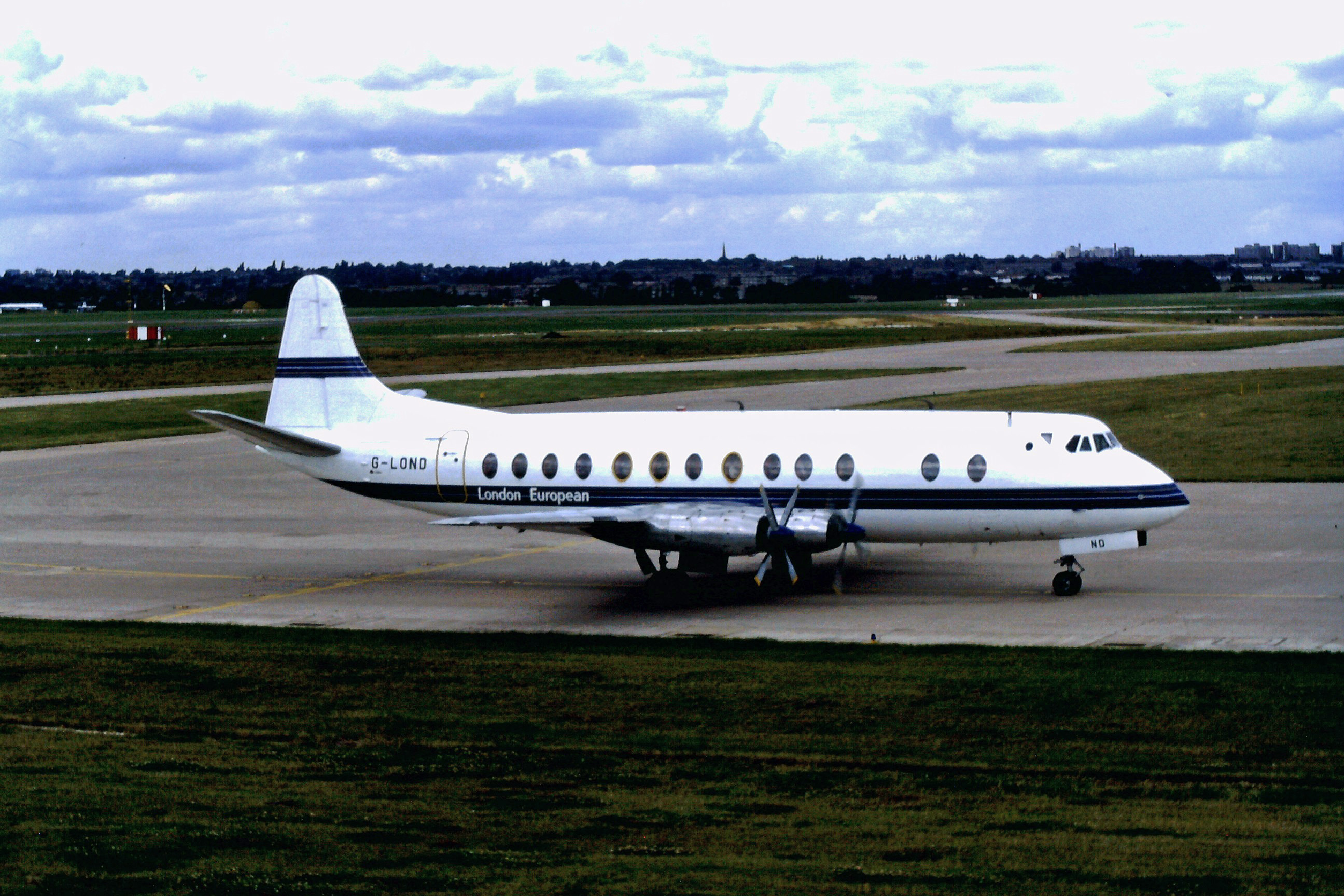
Vickers Viscount 800 in 1985.

The company was established in 1984 and applied to operate a business class service between Luton and Amsterdam using a Vickers Viscount four-engine turboprop airliner.

Following the approval from the Department of Transport (DoT) to operate the route the twice-daily service started on 25 February 1985. The approval was challenged by Luton-based Euroflite virtual airline and the DoT then changed the approval to allow both operators on the mentioned route. The airline was forced by this action to purchase Euroflite for £300,000.

On 17 February 1986, the airline suspended services following unsatisfactory financial results and the temporary removal of the operating licence (AOC). In November 1986 a £630,000 financial rescue package was proposed by Cathal Ryan and other directors of the Irish-airline Ryanair, as they would own 85% of the ailing air carrier. The proposal was accepted by the shareholders, the new owners decided that LEA and Ryanair would remain separate companies although Ryanair flights from Ireland would inter-line with the LEA ones from Luton.

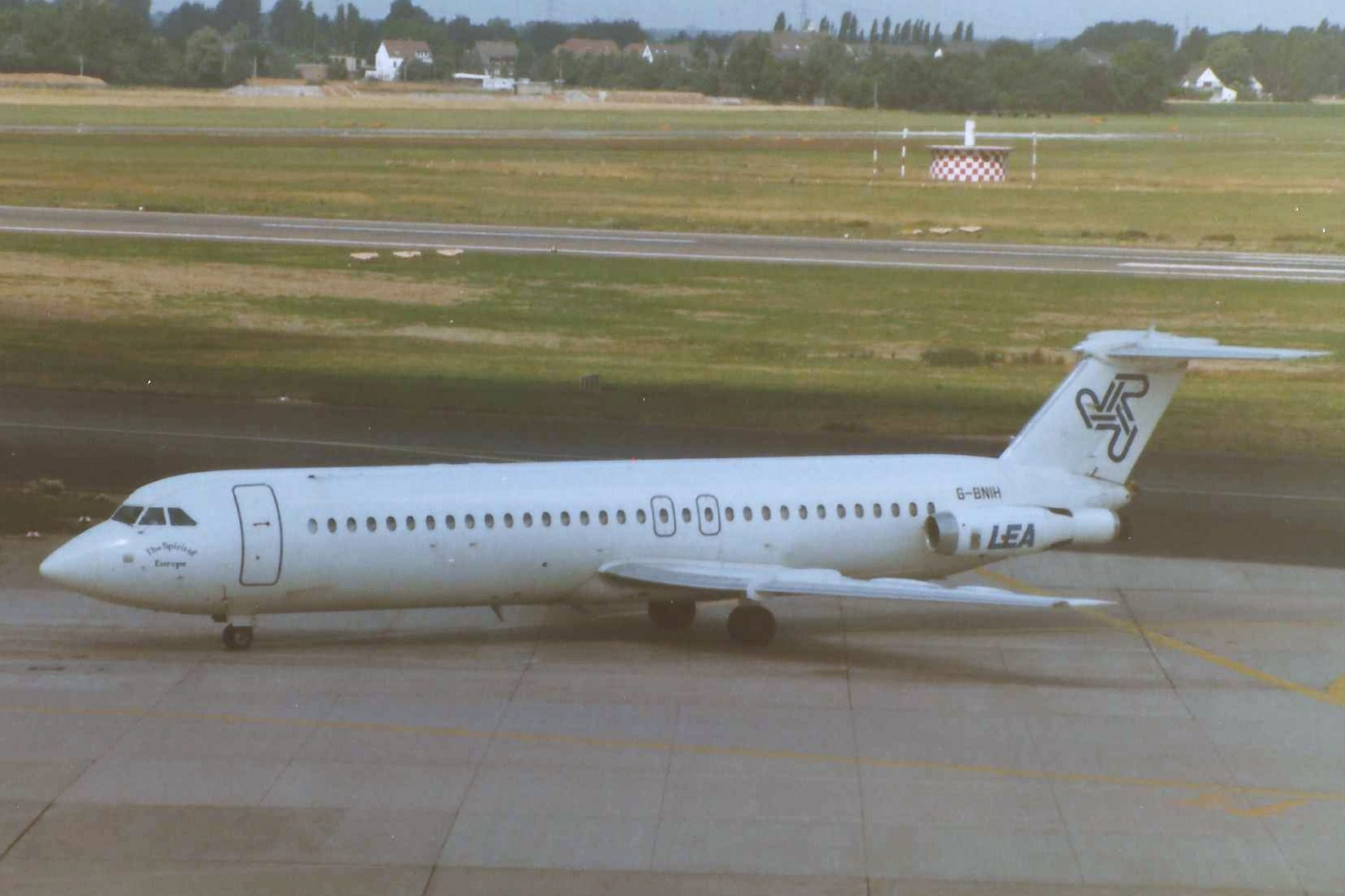
BAC One-Eleven 500 at Düsseldorf in July 1988 wearing a Ryanair-like tail logo.

The airline was re-launched in April 1987 using a leased twin-engined BAC One-Eleven 500 jet airliner, with services to Amsterdam and Brussels starting on 22 May 1987.

In January 1988, the airline was renamed Ryanair Europe. In January of the following year, the airline ended its scheduled service to Brussels and started to become a charter airline on Ryanair behalf.

Not surprisingly in late 1990, the airline had reverted to the London European Airways name and operated five BAC One-Elevens. With the parent Ryanair making losses and move by them to fly from Stansted London European Airways ceased to operate on 31 May 1991.

== See also ==
- List of defunct airlines of the United Kingdom
