= International Skyways =

British regional airline

International Skyways/Skyways International
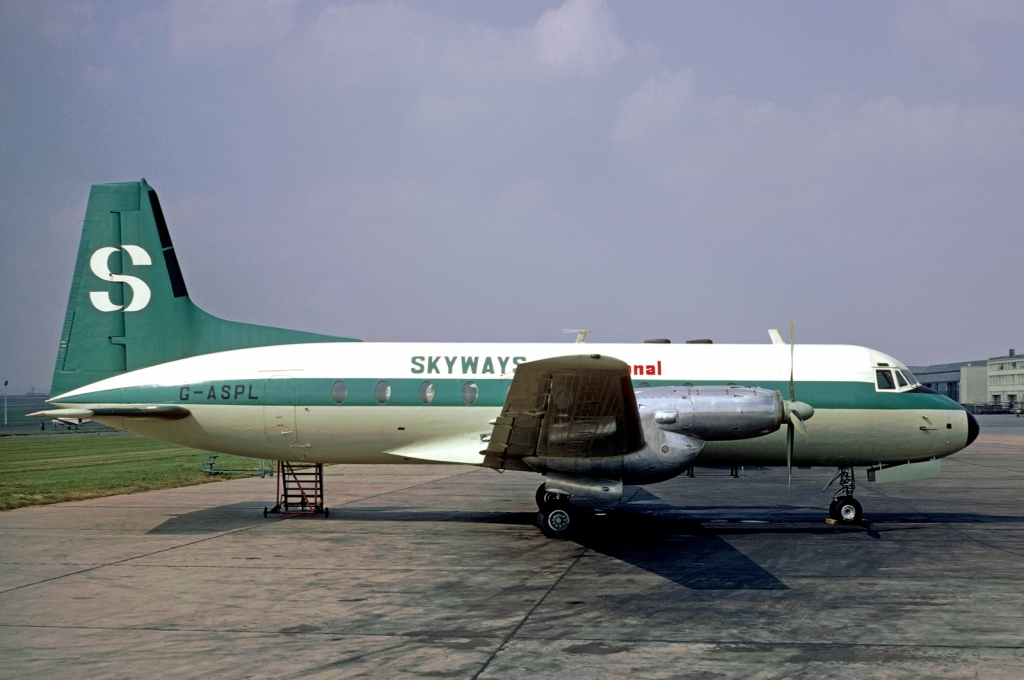
- Hawker Siddeley 748
- Founded: February 1971
- Commenced operations: February 1971
- Ceased operations: April 1972 (changed name to Dan-Air Skyways)
- Hubs: Ashford Airport
- Destinations: United Kingdom; Europe
- Headquarters: Lympne

International Skyways, alias Skyways International, was an ill-fated regional airline based in Lympne U.K. which surrendered after just a little over a year.

== History ==
In February 1971, a group of former Skyways Coach-Air senior managers led by John Knox, the erstwhile airline's last commercial manager, formed International Skyways Ltd. as the “natural heir” to the failed previous air carrier. With the backing of London merchant bank Sterling Industrial Securities, the new management team purchased defunct Skyways Coach-Air's assets. These included aircraft and routes. Following the successful management buyout, the new entity began trading as Skyways International. It resumed the year-round route from Ashford to Beauvais on 8 February 1971 with four 748s that had been grounded at Ashford Airport since the cessation of operations three weeks earlier. This was followed by the reintroduction of routes from Ashford to Ostend, Clermont-Ferrand and Montpellier, as well as from Luton to Ostend and from East Midlands to Beauvais. Skyways International employed 303 people at this time.

In February 1972, Sterling Industrial Securities sold the airline to Dan-Air for £650,000. (Note: £625,000 for the four ex-Skyways HS 748s and £25,000 for the defunct airline's vehicles) Dan-Air completed the deal to take over International Skyways from Sterling Industrial Securities in April of that year, following which it integrated most of the routes into its own network of regional, short-haul scheduled services. Initially, these routes were operated by a separate subsidiary named Dan-Air Skyways. Such titles were applied to the four inherited HS 748s.

By 1974, Dan-Air Skyways was fully integrated with the rest of Dan-Air's scheduled operation, as a result of which it ceased to exist as a separate entity and the full Dan-Air livery was applied to all the fleet.

== See also ==
- List of defunct airlines of the United Kingdom

== Notes and citations ==
=== Sources ===
- "Flight International". Flight International. Sutton, UK: Reed Business Information. ISSN 0015-3710. (various backdated issues relating to Skyways International 1971-1972)
- Simons, Graham M. (1993). The Spirit of Dan-Air. Peterborough, UK: GMS Enterprises. ISBN 1-870384-20-2.
- "Airliner World (Skyways: Coach Air, New ventures, Another turbulent spell)". Airliner World. Stamford, UK: Key Publishing: 66–69. November 2011. ISSN 1465-6337. (Airliner World online)
