= Excalibur Airways =

| IATA | ICAO | Call sign |
|---|---|---|
| EXC | EX/EQ | CAMELOT and later EXCALIBUR |
- Founded: December 1991
- Commenced operations: May 1992
- Ceased operations: June 1996
- Operating bases: East Midlands Airport
- Headquarters: Castle Donington, United Kingdom

Excalibur Airways was a charter airline based in England. It had its head office on the grounds of East Midlands Airport in Castle Donington, Leicestershire.

== History ==
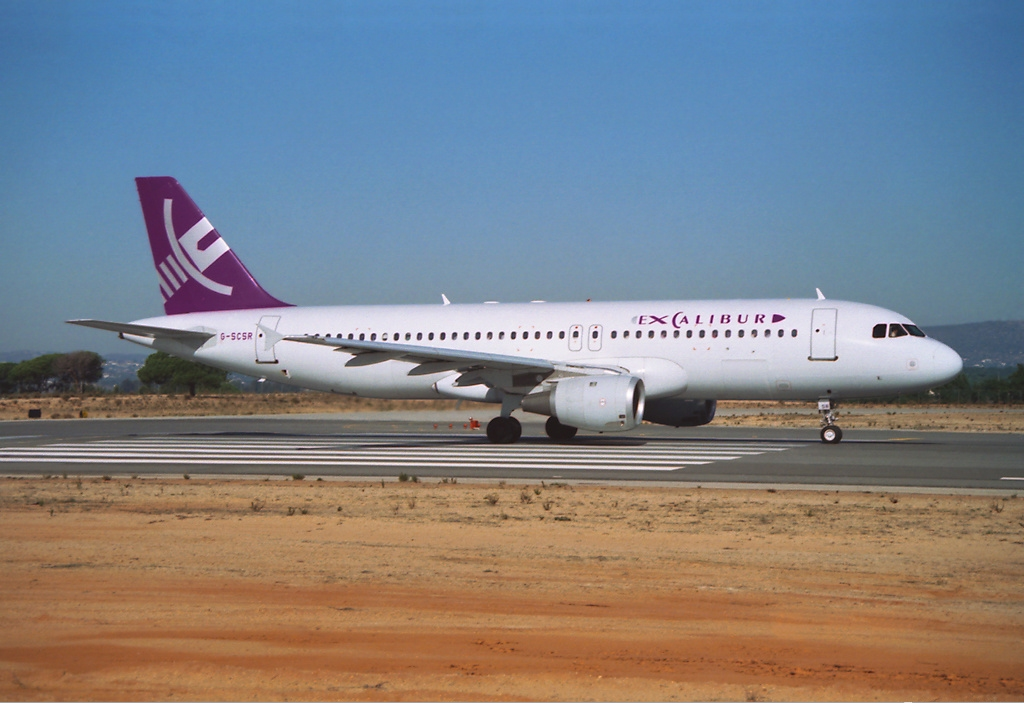
Airbus A320 at Faro Airport in 1992.

Excalibur Airways was formed in late december 1991 on the remnants of TEA UK assets. It was based at the East Midlands Airport. It began charter operations on 1 May 1992 with three leased Airbus A320s and most of the flights were out of London Gatwick airport. In 1994, one more A320 and a Boeing 737-300 were added. Excalibur was the first UK charter airline to operate the A320 with its (at the time) new fly-by-wire control system.

Most of the holiday charter flights were to Egypt, although that was not the only destination since they also reached the holiday resorts in the Mediterranean basin and North Africa. In 1994 Excalibur offered direct services from Gatwick into Eilat (ETH) in troubled Southern Israel. ETH is conveniently right in the town centre and at the time almost all other operators were flying into Ovda (VDA), which is about an hour by coach to the North of the town. The downside was that, because of weight limitations, return flights had to make a refuelling stop at Tel Aviv (TLV) before continuing on to Gatwick.

By the summer of 1995, the company had two aircraft operating from London Gatwick airport, one from Manchester, one from East Midlands airport, and one operating north eastern airports, including Newcastle and Humberside. Flights were still operated to Egypt, as well as to popular Mediterranean destinations such as Spain, Greece, Turkey, Italy, and further afield to the Canary Islands. Some charter flights also flew to Iceland, and other non-holiday destinations such as Frankfurt. During 1995 the company operated solely with A320 aircraft.

Then, at the end of 1995, the company wanted to start flights to Florida and the Caribbean, so there was a need for a larger aircraft with more range and the Douglas DC-10-30 was chosen. An incident with a DC-10 seen with smoke coming from the aircraft followed by an aborted take-off shattered public confidence in the airline. Then the airline lost most of its medium-range charter contracts and the service problems that followed forced the travel operators to withdraw their contracts, hence, Excalibur shut down in late June 1996.

== Fleet and aircraft registrations ==
- 7 x Airbus A320-212 G-BWKO, G-HAGT, G-OEXC, G-BWCP, G-SCSR, G-KMAM, G-BWKN
- 1 x Boeing 737-3Q8 G-OCHA
- 2 x Douglas DC-10-30 F-GTDF, V2-LEH (both on lease-purchase)

== See also ==
- List of defunct airlines of the United Kingdom
