= Aberdeen London Express =

Scottish airline based Aberdeen, 1994

IATA	ICAO	Call sign
E7	EAF	EUROCHARTER
- Founded: September 1993
- Commenced operations: 31 October 1994
- Ceased operations: 6 December 1994
- Operating bases: Aberdeen Airport
- Fleet size: 1
- Destinations: London Stansted
- Headquarters: 100 Union Street, Aberdeen
- Key people: Dr Robert Perryment (CEO)

Aberdeen London Express Limited (also known as ALEX) was a short lived airline that operated a single aircraft on flights between Aberdeen Airport and London Stansted.

== History ==
Aberdeen London Express Limited was established on 8 April 1993 and officially registered with the Civil Aviation Authority in September by Dr Robert Perryment. The airline schedule allowed travelers to arrive in London by 09:30am, and leave after a day's work for Aberdeen arrival by the evening. Initial bookings were primarily made by oil and gas companies.

The airline commenced flights on 31 October 1994. However, due to poor demand, and the oil and gas companies backing not forthcoming, it ceased operations on 6 December 1994 and filed for liquidation. During their operation, Aberdeen London Express had one aircraft, a leased BAC 1-11 (G-AVMI) from European Aviation. Aberdeen London Express Limited worked closely with European who operated the aircraft on an ACMI basis, as part of their own business strategy to support newly founded airlines. This meant Aberdeen London Express Limited utilised European's IATA, ICAO and Callsign information as noted on the flight numbers EAF5003 & EAF5004.

== Founder ==
Aberdeen London Express Limited was founded by Dr Robert Perryment, a former member of the British Army. He spent time working for Lloyd's of London as a broker in Africa, before moving into the oil and gas industry, prior to setting up the airline. In 1996, Perryment supported Stelios Haji-Ioannou in setting up Easyjet's flights to Aberdeen and Inverness. Perryment later set up Distribution Hygiene Services and has written a book about being a Christian in the military. He is now based in Portugal.

== Destinations ==
- Aberdeen - Aberdeen Airport
- London - London Stansted Airport

== Fleet ==
Aberdeen London Express Limited's fleet at the time of closure was:

Aircraft	In service	Passengers
BAC 1-11	1	104

== See also ==
- List of defunct airlines of the United Kingdom
