= Ambassador Airways =

United Kingdom charter airline (1992–1994)

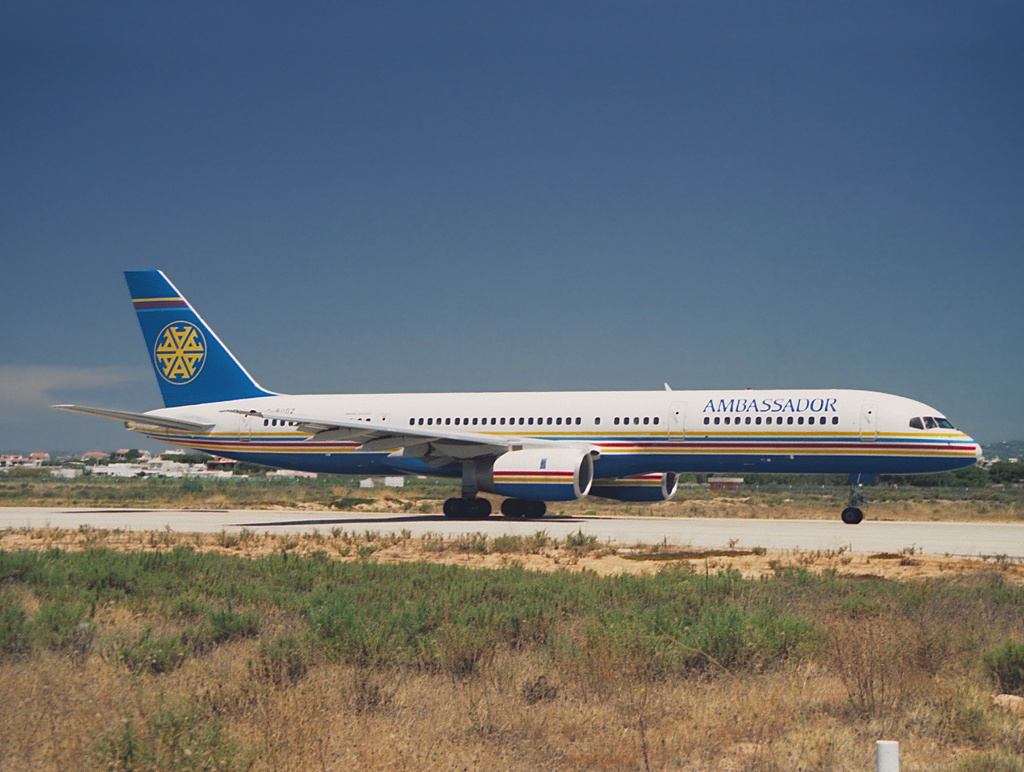
- Boeing 757
IATA	ICAO	Call sign
B3	AMY	AMBASSADOR
- Founded: 14 February 1992
- Ceased operations: 28 November 1994
- Fleet size: 8
- Parent company: Best Leisure Group
- Headquarters: United Kingdom

Ambassador Airways was a British charter airline formed on 14 February 1992 as a subsidiary of the travel company Best Leisure Travel and based at Gatwick Airport. The airline was actually founded under the name Best Air, but it was changed the following May.

== History ==
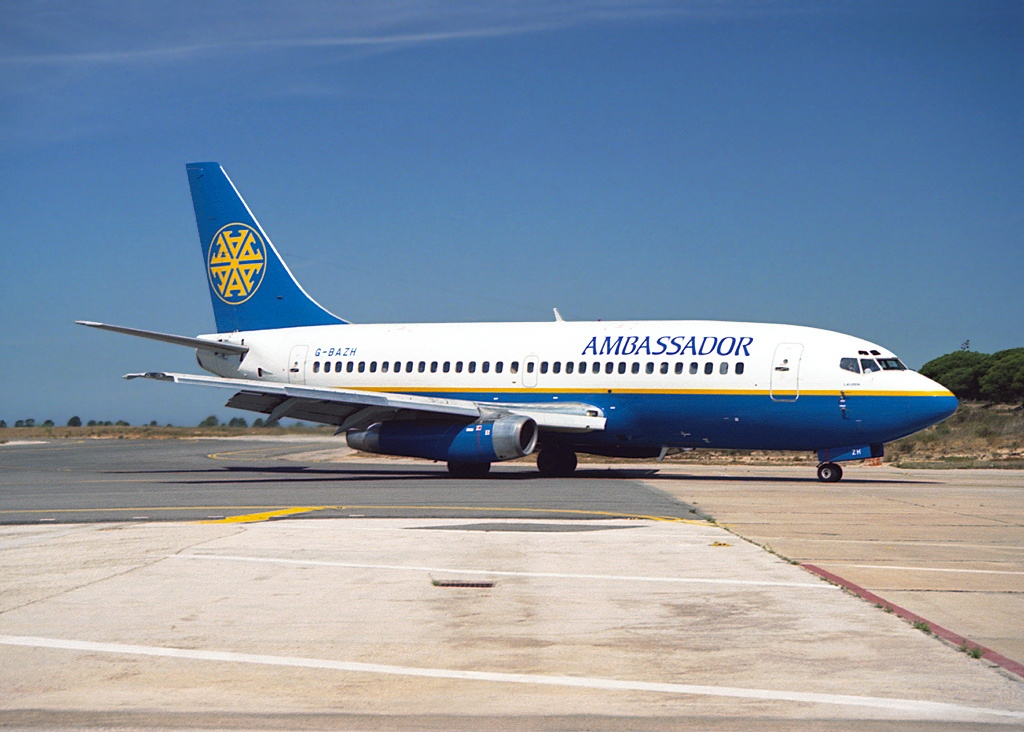
Boeing 737-200

Ambassador Airways was founded in 1992 by Best Leisure Travel to serve Greek and Cypriot tourists between Greece and Cyprus, whilst also providing charter flights to tour companies. It was initially based at Newcastle International Airport before moving to Gatwick Airport in October 1993. It started operations with two leased Boeing 757s, originally flown by third party airlines until a charter license was granted. It operated under the call sign "AMBASSADOR".

The first service was operated on 21 May 1993 from Newcastle to Larnaca. In the summer of 1993, the airline provided 75,000 seats with its two Boeing 757s. In its first year of service, the airline carried 485,000 passengers. The fleet expanded for the summer 1994 season to operate four Boeing 757s, two leased Boeing 737-200s and two leased Airbus A320s. The operations focused on flights mainly from Birmingham, Manchester and Newcastle. Suffering from lack of financing and accumulating debts, the airline ceased operating on 28 November 1994 and was placed in administration the next day. In parallel, the collapse of Ambassador Airways contributed to Best Leisure Travel going bankrupt and the air carrier fleet was impounded.

== Fleet ==
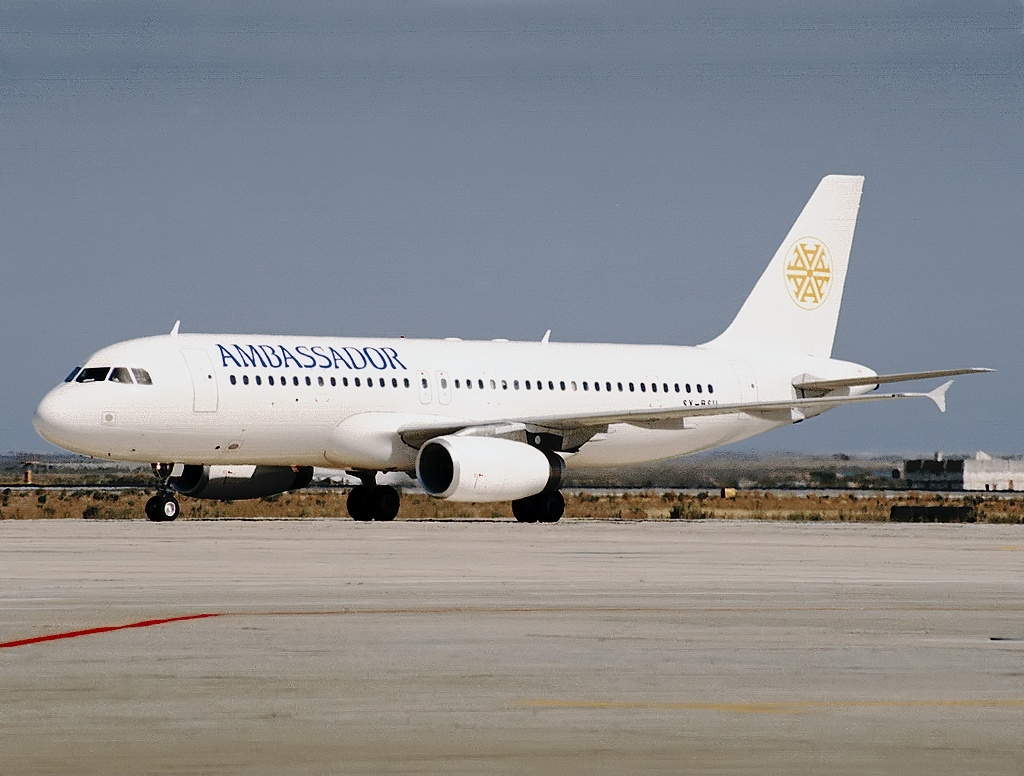
Airbus A320

The airline's fleet comprised the following aircraft:

- 4 x Boeing 757-200
- 2 x Boeing 737-200
- 2 x Airbus A320

== See also ==
- List of defunct airlines of the United Kingdom

== Bibliography ==
- Kärcher, Karsten (1997). "Back Matter". Reinventing the Package Holiday Business. Wiesbaden: German University Press. ISBN 978-3-8244-0338-7.
- Perry, Allen; Ashton, Sue (1 October 1994). "Recent Developments in the UK's Outbound Package Tourism Market". Geography. 79 (4). doi:10.1080/20436564.1994.12452459. ISSN 0016-7487. JSTOR 40572462.
- Perry, Allen (December 1994). "The changing face of flying to the sun". Journal of Air Transport Management. 1 (4): 251–254. doi:10.1016/0969-6997(94)90017-5. ISSN 0969-6997.
- Phillips, Alan (2017). Gone but Not Forgotten: Defunct British Airlines Since 1945. United Kingdom: Fonthill Media. ISBN 9781781556276 – via Google Books.
- Shaw, Robbie (1994). Boeing 757. Shrewsbury, United Kingdom: Airlife Publishing. p. 15. ISBN 1-85310-460-4 – via Internet Archive.
- Wickstead, M.J. (2014). Airlines of the British Isles since 1919. Staplefield (West Sussex - U.K.): Air Britain (Historians) Ltd. p. 61. ISBN 978-0-85130-456-4.
- Woodley, Charles (2016). Flying to the Sun: A History of Britain's Holiday Airlines. United Kingdom: The History Press. ISBN 9780750956604 – via Google Books.
