= Paramount Airways Limited =

British charter airline

Paramount Airways
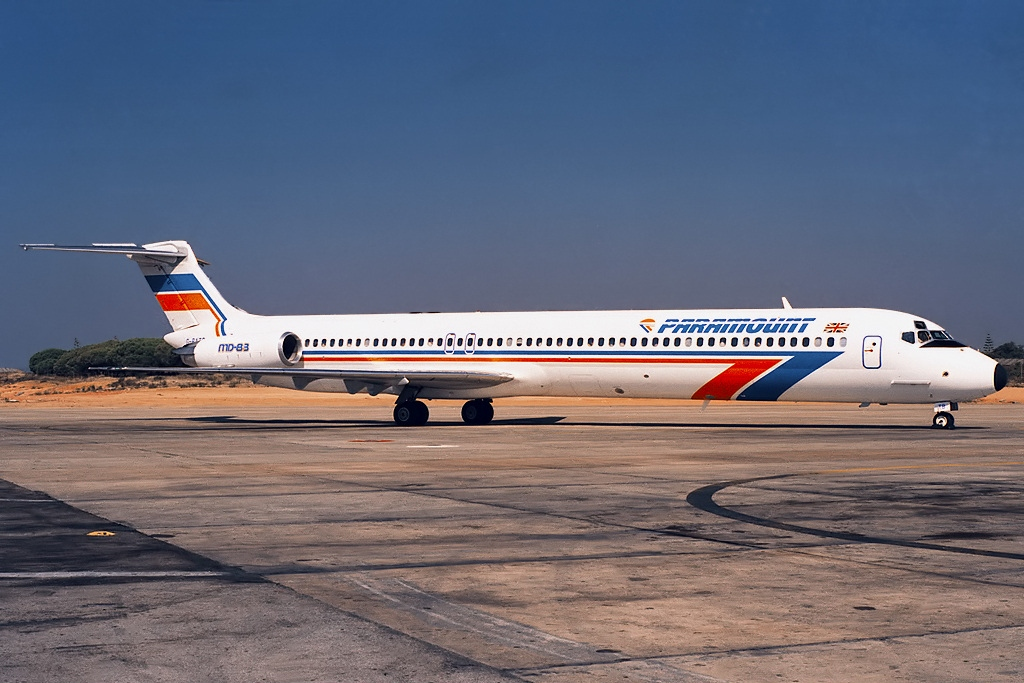
- McDonnell Douglas MD-83, 1987
IATA	ICAO	Call sign
QJ	PAT	PARAMOUNT
- Founded: 8 July 1986
- Commenced operations: 1 May 1987
- Ceased operations: November 1989
- Operating bases: Belfast-International; Birmingham; Bristol
- Fleet size: 5
- Headquarters: Bristol Airport, Bristol, United Kingdom
- Key people: John Ferriday (CEO)

Paramount Airways Ltd. was a British charter airline based at Bristol Airport. It operated flights also from Belfast and Birmingham to Mediterranean basin destinations. The airline entered receivership in Summer 1989 and halted operations in November.

== History ==
Paramount Airways Ltd. was established on 8 July 1986. After that it ordered two brand new McDonnell Douglas MD-83s, with the first one delivered on 24 April 1987 to allow operations to start on 1 May 1987. During the European winter, the airline operated charter flights from Gatwick Airport to Goa. The airline acquired two more MD-83s for the 1988 season.

On 22 November 1988, Paramount took over another minor charter carrier, Cardiff-based Amber Air, which was experiencing difficulty in sustaining operations. On 7 July 1989, Paramount was declared insolvent to the tune of £11m, major creditors being Bristol and Birmingham Airports and entered administration. It was also under examination by the Serious Fraud Office over the loss of £13.5 million by the Eagle Trust which it had close links and shared a chairman.

On 2 September, an McDonnell Douglas MD-83 was impounded at Birmingham, while the other, plus the ex Amber Air Boeing 737, were similarly detained at Bristol. All the aircraft were subsequently released and by October, there appeared to be reasonable prospects of finding a buyer for the airline. Instead the McDonnell Douglas MD-83s were released on 14 November for return to their lessor. The airline was not actually wound-up until July 1995, following a lengthy litigation by former employees to secure outstanding wages and pension rights.

== Fleet ==
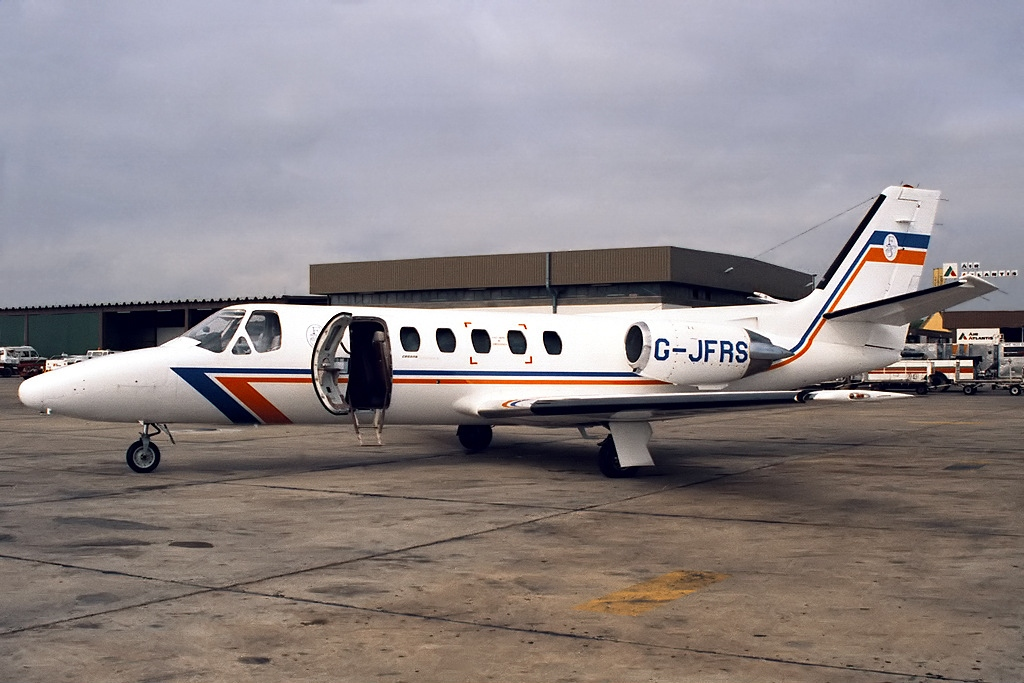
A Paramount Executive Cessna Citation II at Faro Airport in 1987

Paramount Airways operated the following aircraft:

Aircraft type	Total	Introduced	Retired	Remarks
Boeing 727-100	1	1989	1989	Leased from American Trans Air
Boeing 737-200	2	1988	1989	
Boeing 737-300	1	1989	1989	
McDonnell Douglas MD-83	4	1987	1989	
Cessna Citation II	1	1987	1989	Operated as Paramount Executive

== See also ==
- List of defunct airlines of the United Kingdom
