= Leisure International Airways =

Charter airline of the United Kingdom (1993–1998)

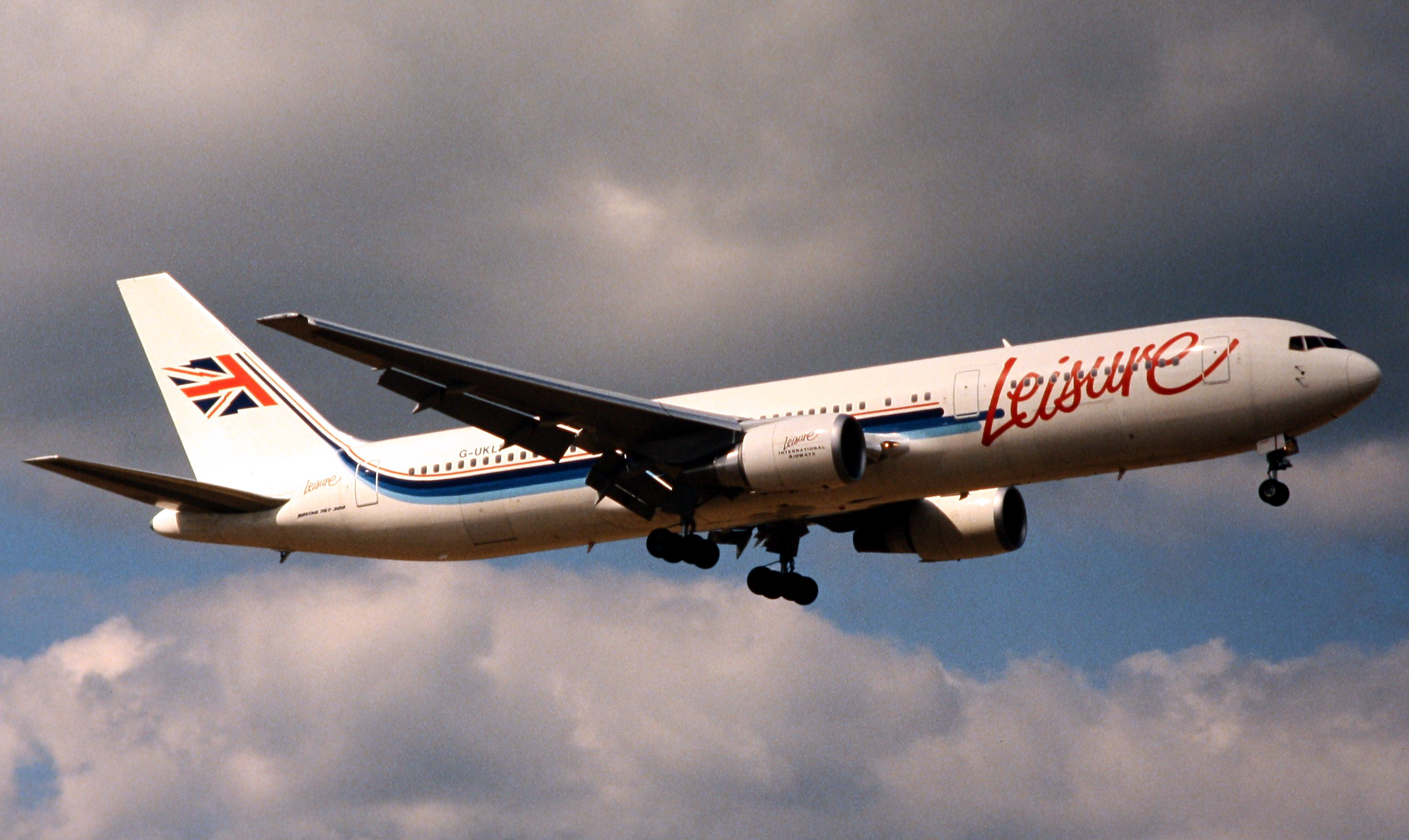
- Boeing 767-300
| IATA | ICAO | Call sign |
|---|---|---|
| MV | ULE | LEISURE |
- Founded: 18 February 1992
- Commenced operations: 4 April 1993
- Ceased operations: 1 November 1998 (merged into Air 2000)
- Hubs: London–Gatwick; Manchester

Leisure International Airways was a British charter airline which was established in 1992 and commenced operations one year later. The air carrier merged into Air 2000 in late 1998.

== History ==
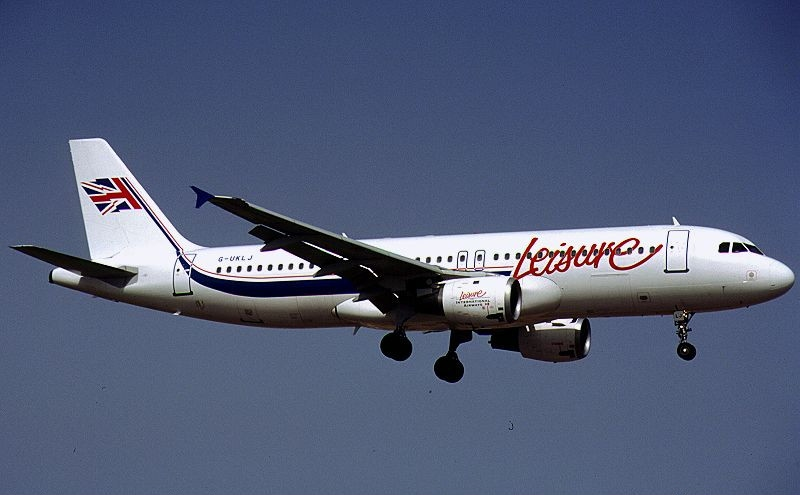
An Airbus A320 landing at Lanzarote Airport

=== Air UK Leisure roots ===
Air UK Leisure was established in June 1987 as a joint venture of Air UK with tour operator Viking International, owner of Unijet holiday brand, to conduct inclusive tour operations with a small fleet of Boeing 737s series 300 and 400. Early in 1996, Unijet purchased two Boeing 767ERs with which to conduct long-haul operations to Florida and the Caribbeans. These aircraft were flown independently under the trading name of Leisure International, although operated with Air UK crews under their AOC. Pending introduction of the long-haul vacation programme, the new aircraft were used on European services, the first of which was flown on 4 April 1993 to Nantes (France).

=== Leisure International Airways ===
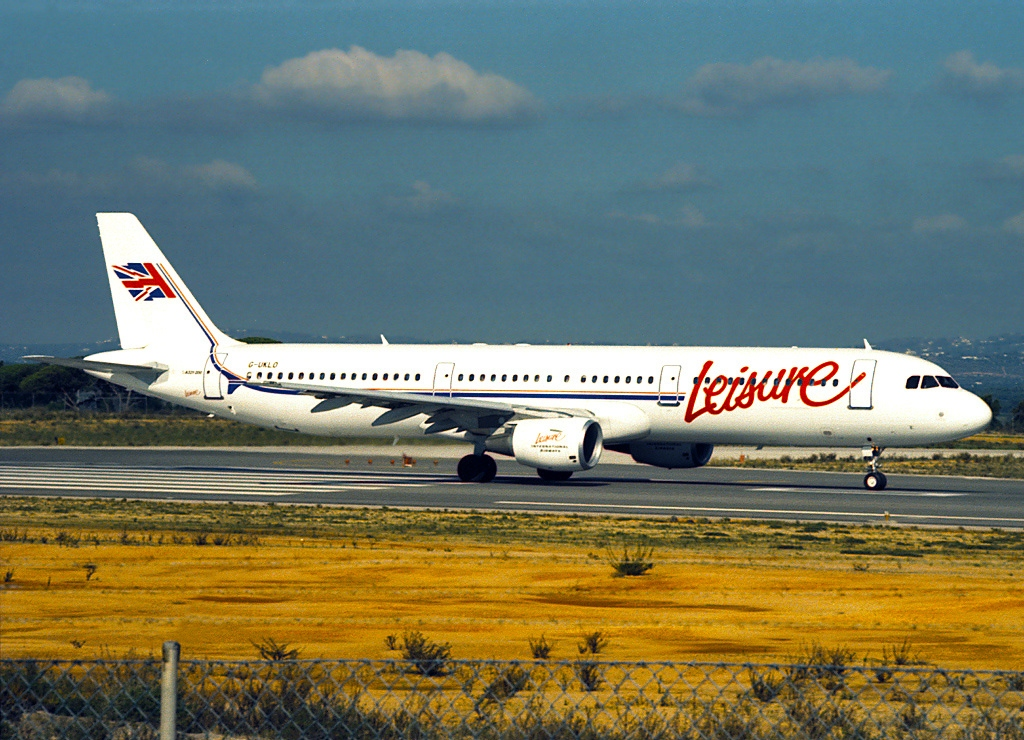
Airbus A321

This airline had been established in February 1992, but the start of operations coincided with 4 April 1993. The fleet was made up by a couple of Boeing 767-300ERs. In parallel to the gradual absorption of Air UK by Dutch flag carrier KLM, in early 1996 Viking/Unijet bought out the remaining 60% shareholding in Air UK Leisure and integrated the whole operation under Leisure International Airways. The main base of operations were transferred to London Gatwick and Manchester. Simultaneously, replacement of the Boeing 737 fleet by Airbus A320s was begun; the first revenue service with the European medium-haul airliner being undertaken on March 26, 1996. Further rationalisation towards an all-Airbus fleet occurred in June of that same year with the announcement of a $200m order for four A321ss that were to be delivered the next year. A Boeing 757 was briefly leased in mid-1998 as a stop-gap aircraft.

On July 9, 1998, the sale of Unijet to the First Choice group for £110m was completed and by the spring of 1999, Leisure International's operations were little by little absorbed into Air 2000. The outstanding order for two Airbus A321s as replacements for the Boeing 767s was cancelled.

== See also ==
- List of defunct airlines of the United Kingdom
