= Transglobe Airways =

British charter airline

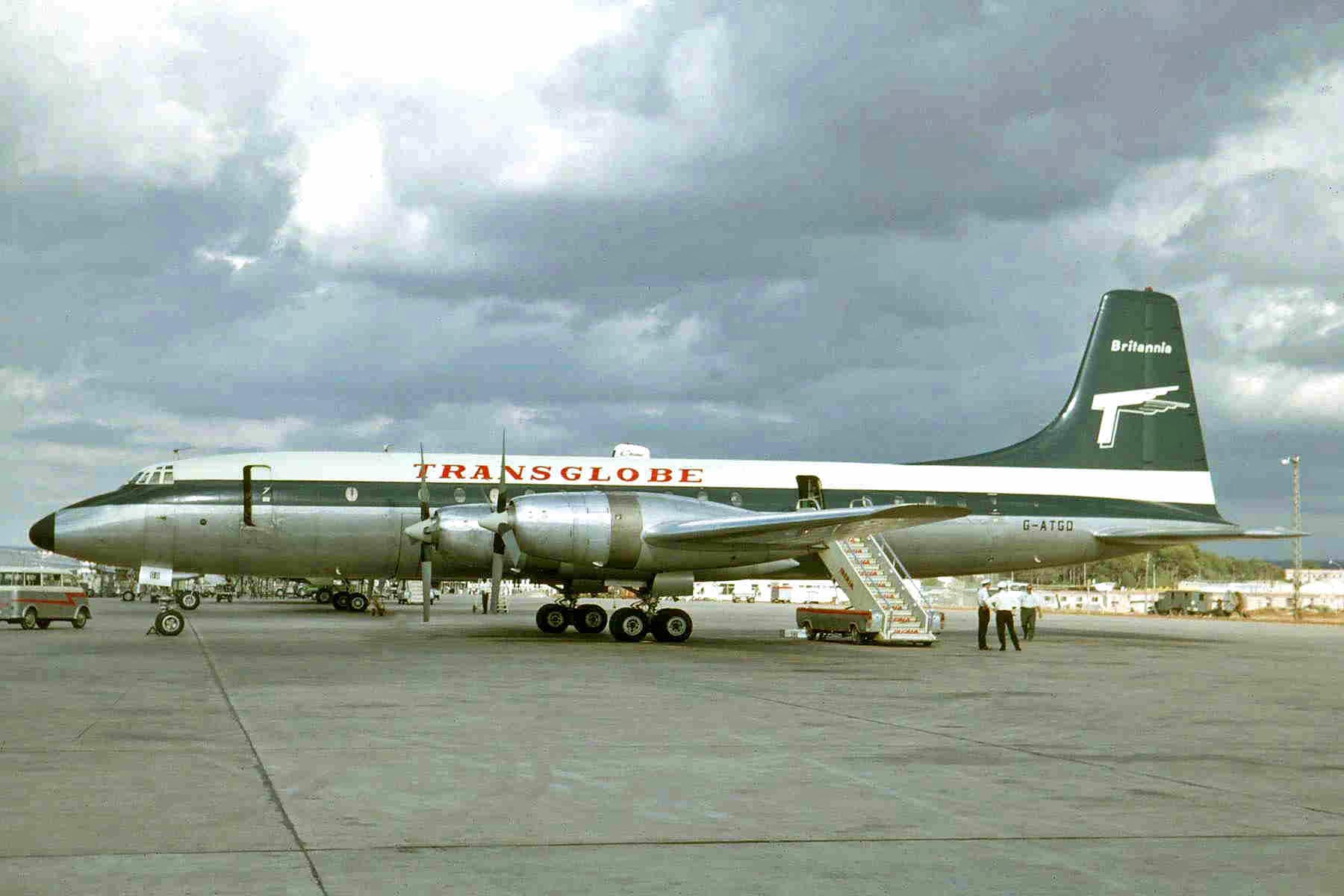
- Bristol Britannia B-175-300
- Founded: 1958 (as Air Links)
- Commenced operations: 1959 (as Air Links)
- Ceased operations: 1968 (as Transglobe Airways)
- Hubs: London Gatwick airport
- Subsidiaries: Air Couriers Ltd.
- Fleet size: 18 (all types included)
- Headquarters: London Gatwick airport
- Key people: S. Wilson Chairman e Managing Director - E.J. Parker Operations Director

Transglobe Airways was a charter airline based in United Kingdom. Firstly known as Air Links it developed into Transglobe Airways in the late 1960s.

== History ==
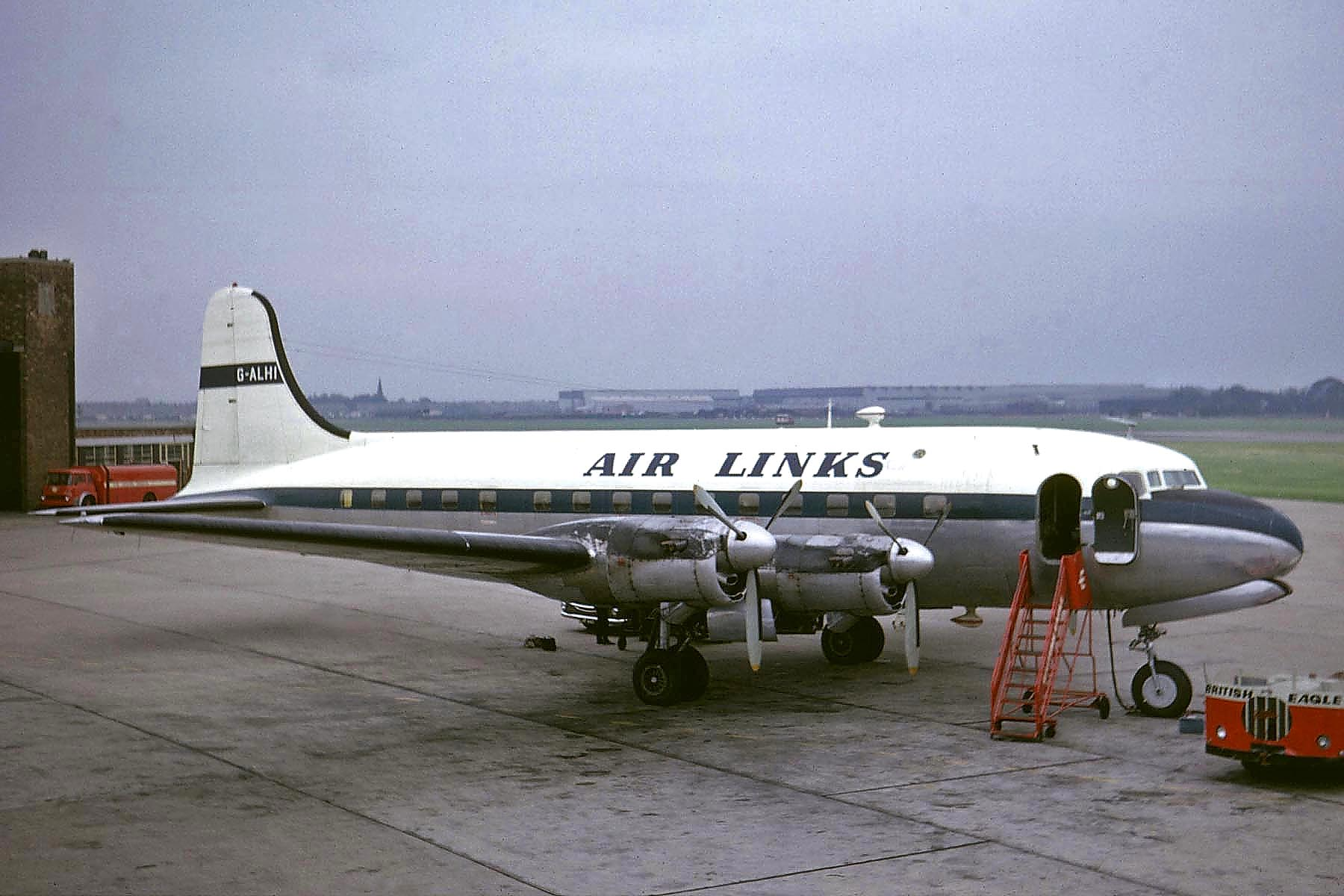
Canadair C-4 Argonaut

Air Links Ltd. was founded on August 21, 1958, by captain pilot Denis Martin, who had been dreaming of it for months. After purchasing a DC-3 in May 1959, Gatwick Airport was chosen as the airline's base of operations, as the airline intended to operate only charters. The first flight took place on July 22, but from Southend Airport. Other flights were operated throughout the summer, primarily from Gatwick and Southend, bound for Central Europe. Air Links also operated on behalf of other airlines, including, in 1960, BEA. In 1962, the operations were reorganized with a strong focus on IT business, also with the support of Aviation Promotion, which operated in the tourism sector. S. Wilson, a motoring entrepreneur, acquired a majority stake in the company, imposing a more austere style in managing the company and its expenses. Plus hiring a competent management staff.

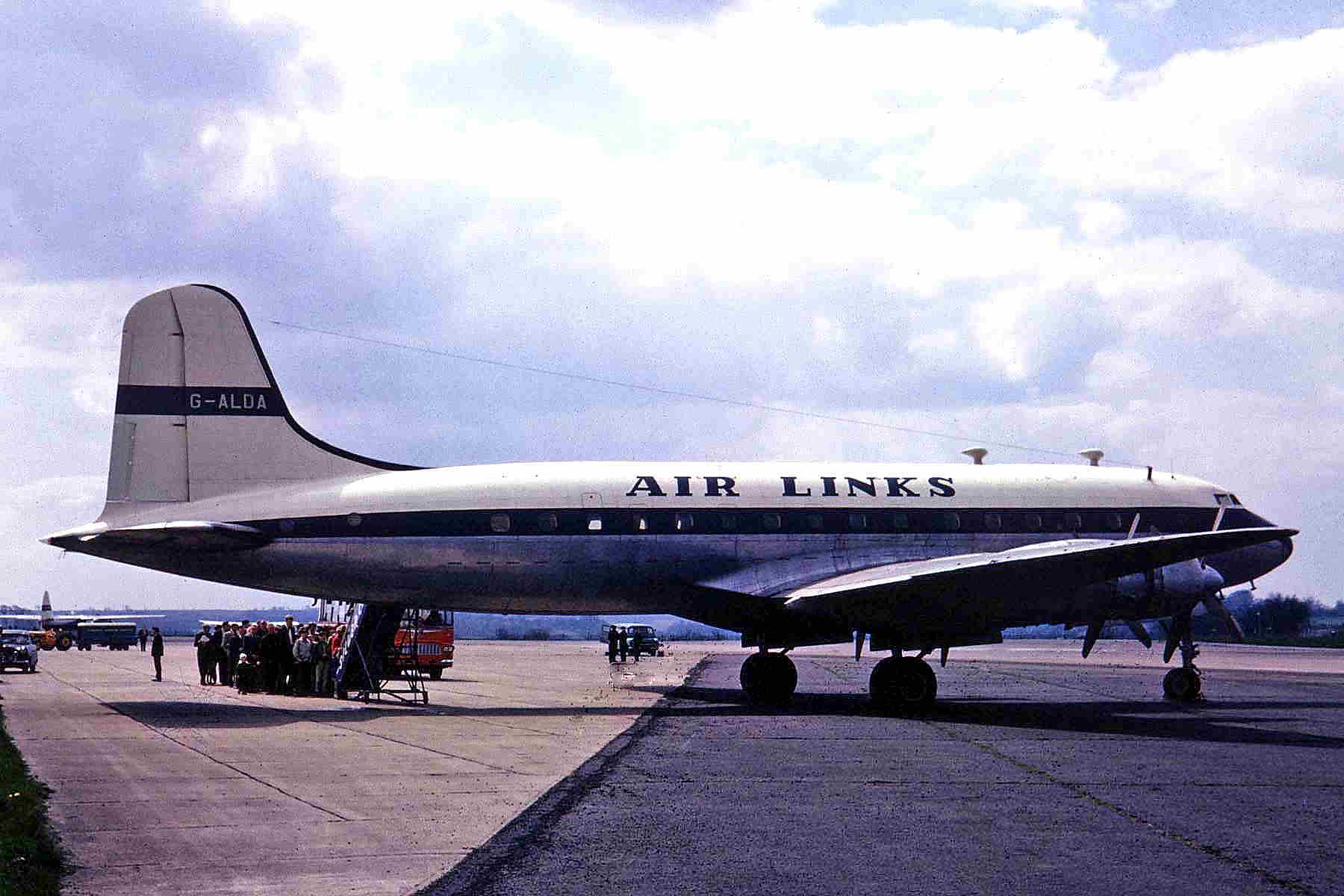
Handley Page H.P.81 Hermes

That same year, three Handley Page H.P.81 Hermes were purchased, two of which were used solely as spare parts. Equipped with 82 seats in a single-class configuration, this aircraft made its maiden flight on December 21st. It subsequently reached many destinations in southern Europe, but the aircraft were showing their age due to frequent mechanical and engine problems. In January 1964, a replacement was found: a Canadair C-4 Argonaut (a Canadian-built DC-4), which began flying on March 28th, to Ostend (Belgium) and back. A second aircraft was delivered in June. This no longer young aircraft nevertheless reached more distant destinations such as Brindisi and, occasionally, the Middle East. It also subsequently flew on behalf of the Ministry of Defense to the Middle and Far East.

But the inevitable replacement was already in sight, the Bristol Britannia B-175 series 300. The first was delivered in mid-May 1965 and entered service in mid-July, but within a few days it changed its skin: the new company name, Transglobe Airways Ltd., was officially adopted on August 1. Initially, however, the aircraft operated almost exclusively on behalf of BUA and in its full livery with a 125-passenger configuration. In the winter of 1965-1966, the airline actively participated in the delivery of oil to Southern Rhodesia, which had declared independence (UDI). In 1966, Bolton Steamship Co. purchased 42% of the shares. The first flight to the USA was performed in May. Also in anticipation of further activities in this geographical area, a lease-purchase contract for two Flying Tiger Line Canadair CL-44s was signed in September, but the deal was blocked by the U.S.A. Civil Aeronautics Board.

In May 1967, the airline announced a lease-purchase agreement for six CL-44s belonging to Seaboard World Airlines, five of which were convertible versions, capable of carrying 165 passengers or 28 tons of cargo. In July, the airline acquired Air Couriers Ltd., a historic maintenance company also located at Gatwick. In October, the airline requested permission from (U.S.A.) Air Transport Licensing Board to operate scheduled flights, including intermediate stops in Canada. A.T.L.B. refused, partly due to pressure from the British Board of Trade. In April 1968, the Civil Aeronautics Board granted authorization to operate charter flights between the UK and the US, in conjunction with the delivery of the first CL-44. Despite the airline's commitment, the large four-turboprops could not compete with the jetliners now also used by charter companies. The first financial difficulties arose and worsened over the summer, burdened by a debt of £6.5m for the purchase of the CL-44s despite an airline net profit of £400,000 in 1967. Almost surprisingly, Transglobe ceased all operations on 28 November. The CL-44s were recovered by Seaboard World whoich chartered them directly to Trans Mediterranean from Lebanon, who had already chartered them from Transglobe since 1 September.
