= European Skytime =

Private Jet Company

European Skytime Ltd. was a privately owned company based in the United Kingdom specialising in executive jets and the supply of private chartered aircraft to high-net-worth individuals and organisations.

Launched on the first day of the new millennium they were the first company in Europe to offer 25 hours of guaranteed access to a fleet of private jets without having to enter the complicated world of fractional or full aircraft ownership.

In 2006, they partnered with The Carbon Neutral Company to fully offset the emissions generated by their Cheltenham-based head office as well as the additional service of offering their clients the chance to offset the emissions from their own private flying through European Skytime. Skytime were the first company in the world to offer this combination of services.

At the 2007 EBACE and Paris Air Shows, Skytime announced the purchase of a fleet of brand new Bombardier Learjets to be based in London and service clients across Europe. In July 2008 Skytime took delivery of their first Learjet 40XR which will be operated by Manhattan Jet Charter and will be based at Farnborough Airport in Hampshire, UK.

Europe.

The company went into administration in 2012.
