= Manx Airlines (1947–1958) =

- Founded: May 1947 (as Manx Air Charters)
- Commenced operations: 1947
- Ceased operations: 1958 (merged operations into Silver City-Northern Division)
- Hubs: Ronaldsway Airport
- Parent company: British Air Services from 1956

Manx Airlines was a local airline based in IoM - U.K.. It began with charter flights and then established scheduled services which were integrated into the Silver City-Northern Division in 1958.

== History ==
Manx Air Charters Ltd. was established in May 1947 to take advantage of the post-war resurgence in island tourism. Operations began in the following weeks from Ronaldsway Airport, with two DH.89 Dragon Rapides that were kept busy throughout the summer bringing parties of holidaymakers to the island and conducting pleasure flying. Five Rapides were in service by 1949.

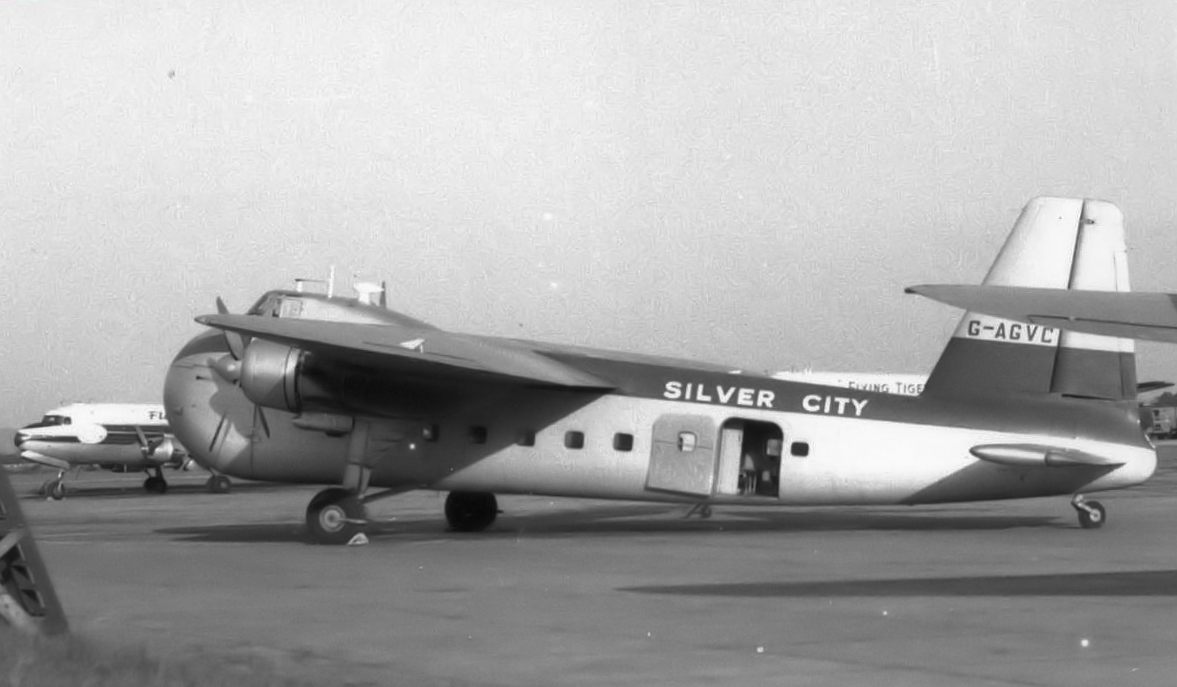
Bristol 170 already in full Silver City livery

In spring 1950 the company successfully gained a BEA associate agreement for scheduled services between the IoM and Carlisle. This summer-only route was flown between May and September and augmented the main business of general charter flying and occasional air ambulance transports. At the end of 1952, Manx obtained further licences for services to Newcastle and Glasgow (Renfrew airport). The company was by now essentially a scheduled operator and the name was changed to Manx Airlines Ltd. in February 1953. At this time, two 34-seat Douglas DC 3 were obtained, primarily for the Glasgow route, while the DH.89s were devoted to the less busy routes and charter activities.

Early in 1956, Manx Airlines was bought out by British Air Services (Britavia) to become part of Silver City Airways. Manx continued to operate under its existing title, but the sole remaining DC 3 was exchanged for two Bristol B-170s, equipped with passenger modules, from the new parent company to maintain existing services, which now included an extension from Carlisle to Newcastle. For the 1957 season, a third B-170 and two DH.114s were transferred from Silver City and a new service to Belfast was opened in the month of May. In June 1957, Manx began offering coach-air trips to the Isle of Man and Northern Ireland but they were closed down at the end of the year due to poor traffic. In the spring of 1958 the Manx name disappeared completely when all its operations were totally integrated with those Silver City-Northern Division. Legally Manx Airlines name survived until August 1973 when it was changed to British Island AW (Manx) Ltd. within the BUA Group of companies.

== Incidents and accidents ==
- 27 February 1958 - B-170 registered G-AICS, after it struck the summit of Winter Hill near Bolton in Lancashire’s West Pennines with 35 fatalities. The cause of the accident was attributed to navigational error after selection of the wrong radio beacon for approach to Manchester.

== Bibliography ==
- Kniveton, G.N. (1986), Manx aviation in war and peace, Douglas (IoM): The Manx Experience
- Kniveton, G.N. (1997), Wings of Man-The story of Manx Airlines, Douglas (IoM): The Manx Experience
