= World Airlines =

London-based regional airline operator

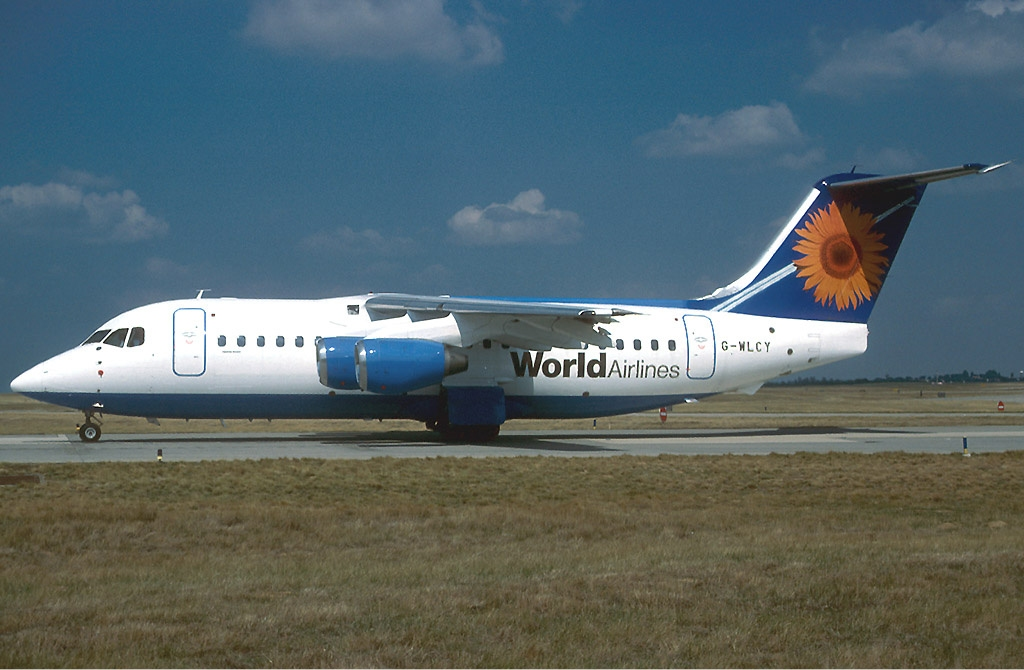
- BAe 146-200 in 1996
IATA	ICAO	Call sign
W2	WRD	ECLIPSE
- Founded: September 1995
- Commenced operations: May 1996
- Ceased operations: October 1996
- Hubs: London City Airport
- Fleet size: 2
- Parent company: World Airlines Group
- Headquarters: London, United Kingdom
- Key people: Nick Stolberg

World Airlines was an airline that briefly operated out of London City Airport in 1996. It was started by entrepreneur Nick Stolberg.

== History ==
World Airlines Ltd. was established on 28 September 1995. It started operations on 5 May 1996 with a four-times-a-day service from London City Airport to Amsterdam. There were, at a later stage, further flights from London City Airport to Munich, Germany.

Nick Stolberg, ex Holiday Autos, was the founder and used the aircraft during publicity for Upside Down his boy band prodigy. The CEO was Allen Marking, who would become easyJet's chief engineer in 1996. Marshals of Cambridge supplied the engineering and spares support for the operation. The cabin crew training was at BA Heathrow airport and swimming pool training in South London area.

The airline used two second-hand aircraft, British Aerospace 146 -200. Both were flown under the AOC of Southend-based wet-lease specialist, Flightline.

Like other Stolberg ventures the airline quickly declined and ceased flying on 1 October.

== Fleet ==
- 2 x BAe 146-200
