= Manx Airlines =

Isle of Man-based airline (1982–2002)

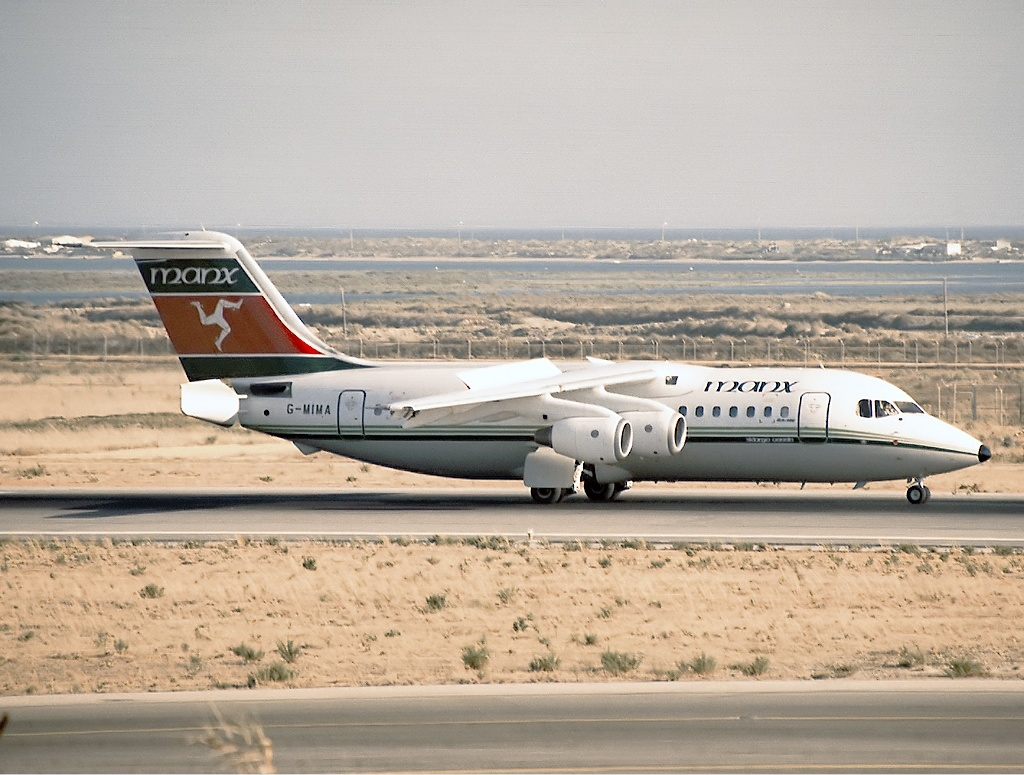
- BAe 146-200
IATA	ICAO	Call sign
JE	MNX	MANX
- Founded: 1982
- Commenced operations: November 1982
- Ceased operations: 2002 (merged into British Airways CitiExpress)
- Hubs: IOM Isle of Man Airport
- Frequent-flyer program: Club Sovereign
- Subsidiaries: Manx Airlines (Europe)
- Fleet size: 5 (in 2002)
- Destinations: 13
- Parent company: British Midland Airways (1982-1988) - British Airways (2001-2002)
- Headquarters: Isle of Man Airport; Ballasalla, Malew, Isle of Man
- Key people: Terry Liddiard

Manx Airlines Ltd. was an English-owned, Isle of Man-based airline operational between 1982 and 2002. Its head office was located on the grounds of Ronaldsway Airport in Ballasalla. An airline with the same name existed between 1947 and 1958.

== History ==
=== Isle of Man roots ===
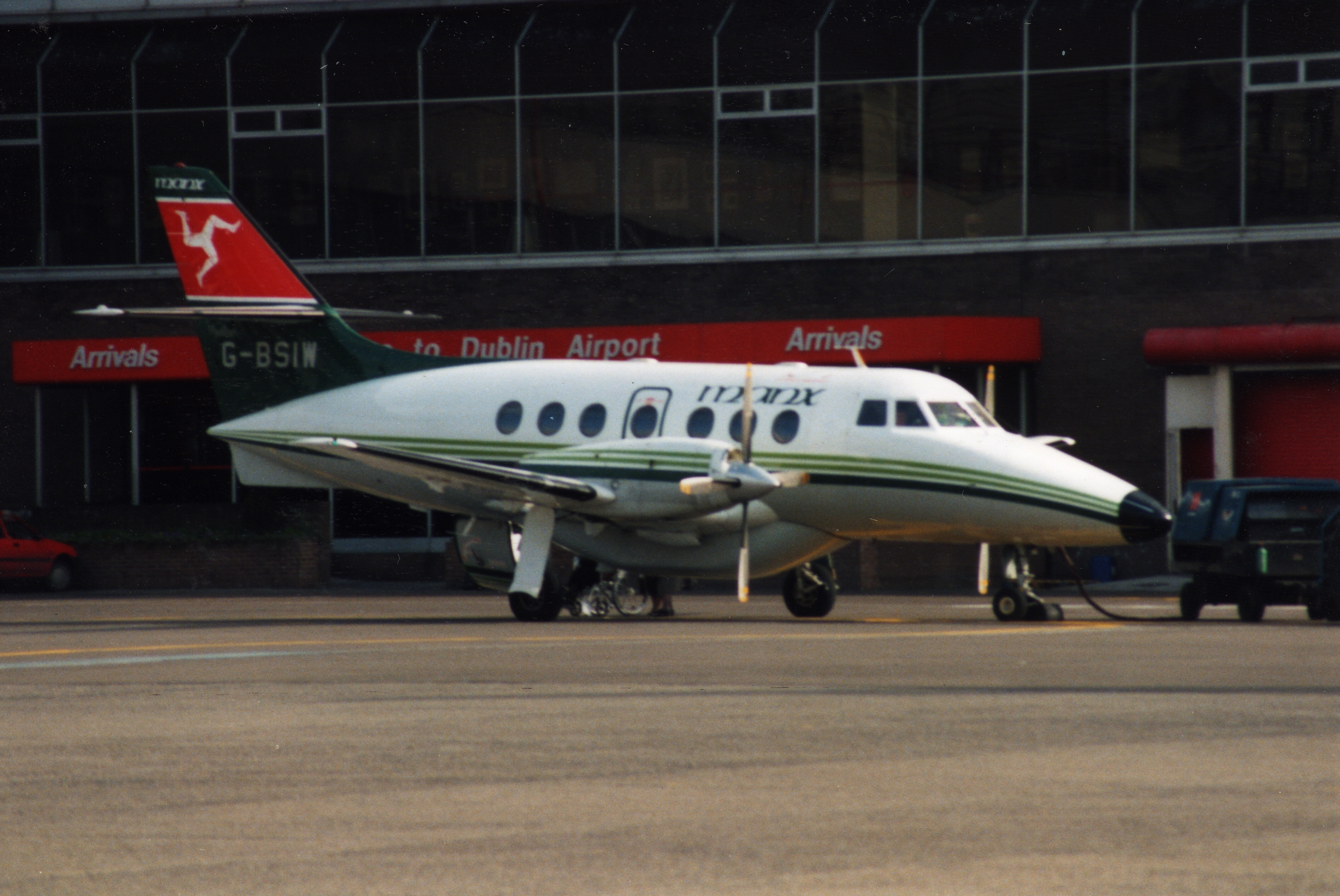
BAe Jetstream 31 at Dublin Airport in 1993

The "new" Manx Airlines was a joint venture established in mid-1982 by British Midland Airways (75%) and AirUK (25%). The fleet comprised a pair of Fokker F27s, one each leased from the parent airlines, and a Vickers Viscount 810 leased from British Midland. Services commenced on 1 November 1982 with the first flight, JE601 from Isle of Man to Glasgow, operated by an Embraer Bandeirante wet leased from Genair. The initial schedule from Isle of Man was three times daily to Liverpool, twice daily to Belfast, Glasgow, Heathrow, and Manchester, and once daily to Blackpool and Dublin. The airline also operated a twice daily service between Liverpool and Belfast. In 1983 services to Belfast moved from Belfast International to the newly opened Belfast City Airport.

For summer 1983, Manx tested a Shorts 330 leased from the manufacturer and later that year leased a Shorts 360 from Air Ecosse. At the same time the daily return to Blackpool operated by an F-27 was replaced with a four times daily service operated by a PA-31 chartered from City Air Links. The Piper was replaced in late 1983 by a DHC-6 leased from Loganair. Following the operational test of the Shorts 360 in late 1983, Manx purchased two directly from Shorts Brothers at a cost of £5 million and they were delivered in March of the following year.

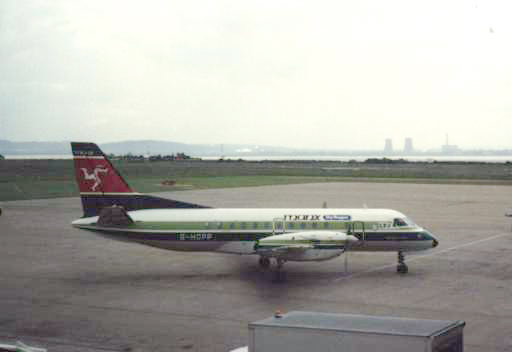
Saab 340A with "SkyHopper" titles at Liverpool on the Heathrow service in 1988

In 1985 Manx was awarded a nightly postal service from Ronaldsway to Manchester, Luton, and Blackpool which was performed by a Shorts 360. For this service a third Shorts 360 was leased from Air Ecosse. At the beginning of 1986 Manx took over the Liverpool to Heathrow route from parent British Midland, adding a fourth Shorts 360 to operate the service. Later that year this aircraft was replaced by a leased Saab 340 wearing "SkyHopper" titles. In March 1987, Airlines of Britain Holdings (ABH) was formed to act as a holding company for British Midland Airways and its subsidiaries. The group owned 100% of British Midland, Loganair, and Eurocity Express and retained control of 75% of Manx. In June 1988 ABH acquired Air UK's 25% stake in Manx, making the airline a wholly owned subsidiary of ABH.

In mid-1987 the airline announced plans to upgrade the Isle of Man to Heathrow service to all jet operation. Unable to acquire its own jets, a BAC 1-11 was leased from Airways International Cymru for the London route. Later in that year Manx acquired its first jet aircraft, a leased BAe 146-100, which entered service on the Heathrow route replacing the BAC 1–11. Since its founding five years earlier, Manx had primarily operated the Heathrow route with Viscounts provided by parent British Midland or leased from other operators. With the introduction of jets in 1987 and the arrival of the first twin-turboprop BAe ATP in 1988, the Viscounts were retired. The final scheduled Viscount flight in to Heathrow operated in the afternoon. In 1989 a new £1 million maintenance hangar for the airline opened at Ronaldsway Airport which became a CAA approved facility for BAe ATP maintenance. The air carrier had changed its corporate registered name to Manx Airlines (IoM) on 25 March 1991.

=== Expansion and sale ===
==== BRAL-British Regional Airlines ====
In September 1996, Airlines of Britain announced it would split its regional airlines into a separate grouping which would enable it to increase its franchise links with British Airways while British Midland looked to increase ties with Lufthansa. The new airline was renamed British Regional Airlines (BRAL). At the same time, British Airways closed down its own 'Highlands' division.

A small Manx Airlines operation retained its own identity operating five aircraft on routes from the Isle of Man. The British Regional Airline Group thus contained Manx Airlines, BRAL-British Regional Airlines, and Loganair whose name was retained for trading purposes. In 1998 British Regional Airlines Group floated on the London Stock Exchange. In late 1998, Manx changed its corporate identity and introduced a new livery featuring a dark belly.

==== Changes and further mergers ====
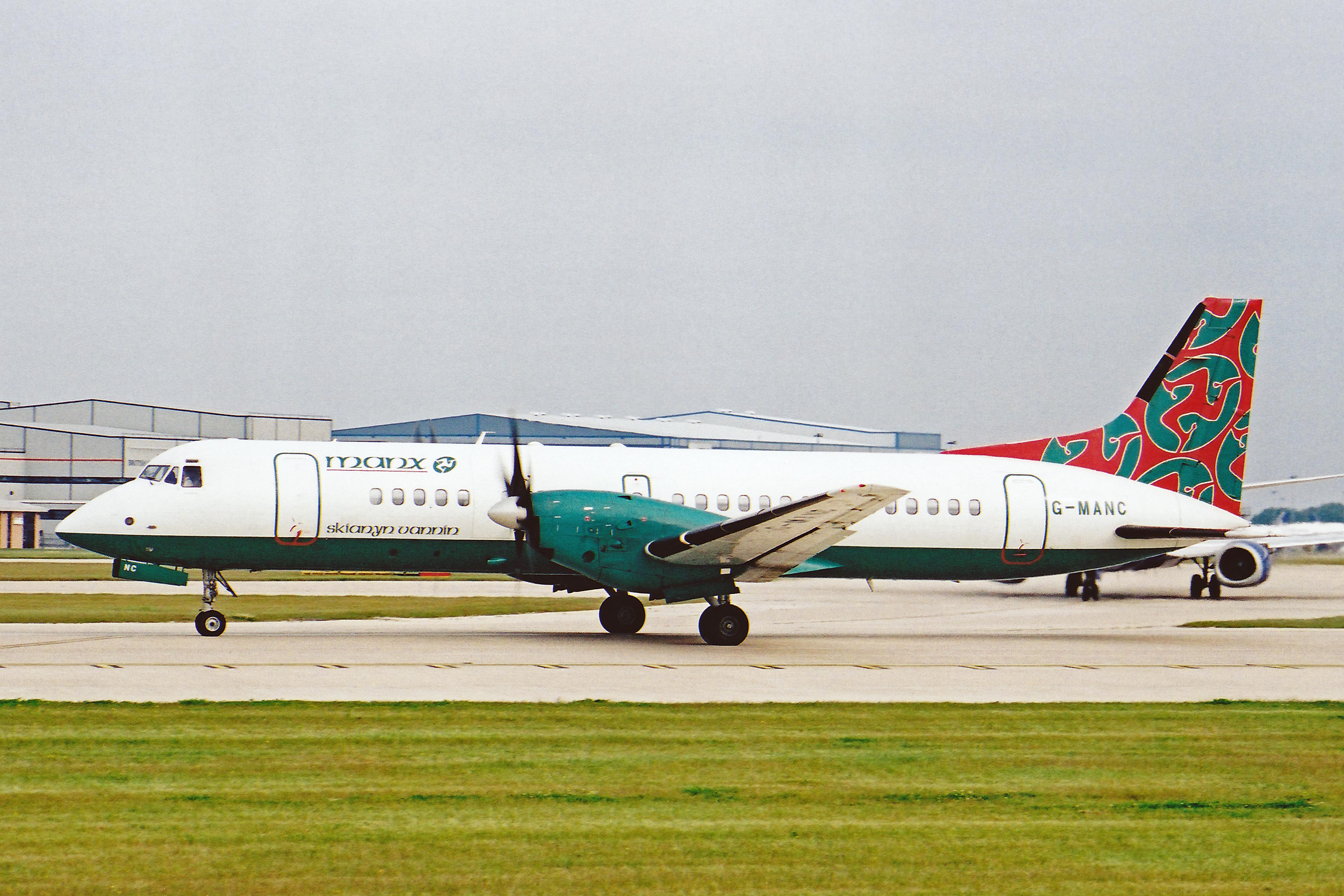
BAe ATP in the British Airways sponsored Triskelion livery, June 2002

In March 2001, British Airways purchased the British Regional Airlines Group for £78 million. BRAL-British Regional Airlines then merged with Brymon Airways to create British Airways CitiExpress in March 2002, with Manx Airlines continuing to operate as a stand-alone operation. In mid-2002 it was announced that Manx Airlines would also be integrated into the new regional carrier.

Manx Airlines ceased operations on 31 August 2002. The last flight was planned to be flown by a BAe 146 from London (Gatwick) to Isle of Man Airport (Ronaldsway). However, due to technical problems, a sub-chartered aircraft was brought in to operate this service. Therefore, the honour of operating the last Manx Airlines flight (JE 818 Birmingham to Ronaldsway) went to Manx-born pilot Captain Paul Quine, who was in command of ATP G-MANB, which landed at Ronaldsway at 20:10 GMT on Saturday, 31 August 2002. Next day all became British Airways CitiExpress.

== Fleet ==
In the 1982–2002 years Manx Airlines operated the following types of aircraft:

- Piper PA-31 (Chartered from City Air Links between 1983–1984 to serve Isle of Man - Blackpool)

Between March 1999 and 31 August 2002, the fleet included the following aircraft types:

Aircraft type	Number	Registrations
BAe 146	1	G-MIMA
BAe ATP	3	G-MANA, G-MANB, G-MANC
Jetstream 41	1	G-MAJA

== See also ==
- Manx Airlines (1947)
- List of defunct airlines of the United Kingdom

== Bibliography ==
- Kniveton, G.N. (1986), Manx aviation in war and peace, Douglas (IoM): The Manx Experience
- Kniveton, G.N. (1997), Wings of Man-The story of Manx Airlines, Douglas (IoM): The Manx Experience
