= CWY =

CWY may refer to:

- Canada World Youth, an international non-profit
- Cherokee, an indigenous people of the United States (Cherokee: ᏣᎳᎩ)
- Cherokee language (Cherokee: ᏣᎳᎩ ᎦᏬᏂᎯᏍᏗ)
- Cleanaway, an Australian waste management firm
- Clearway (aviation)
- Conwy County Borough, in Wales
- Woodgate Aviation, a British aircraft charter
