= BA CityFlyer =

Regional subsidiary of British Airways

BA Cityflyer

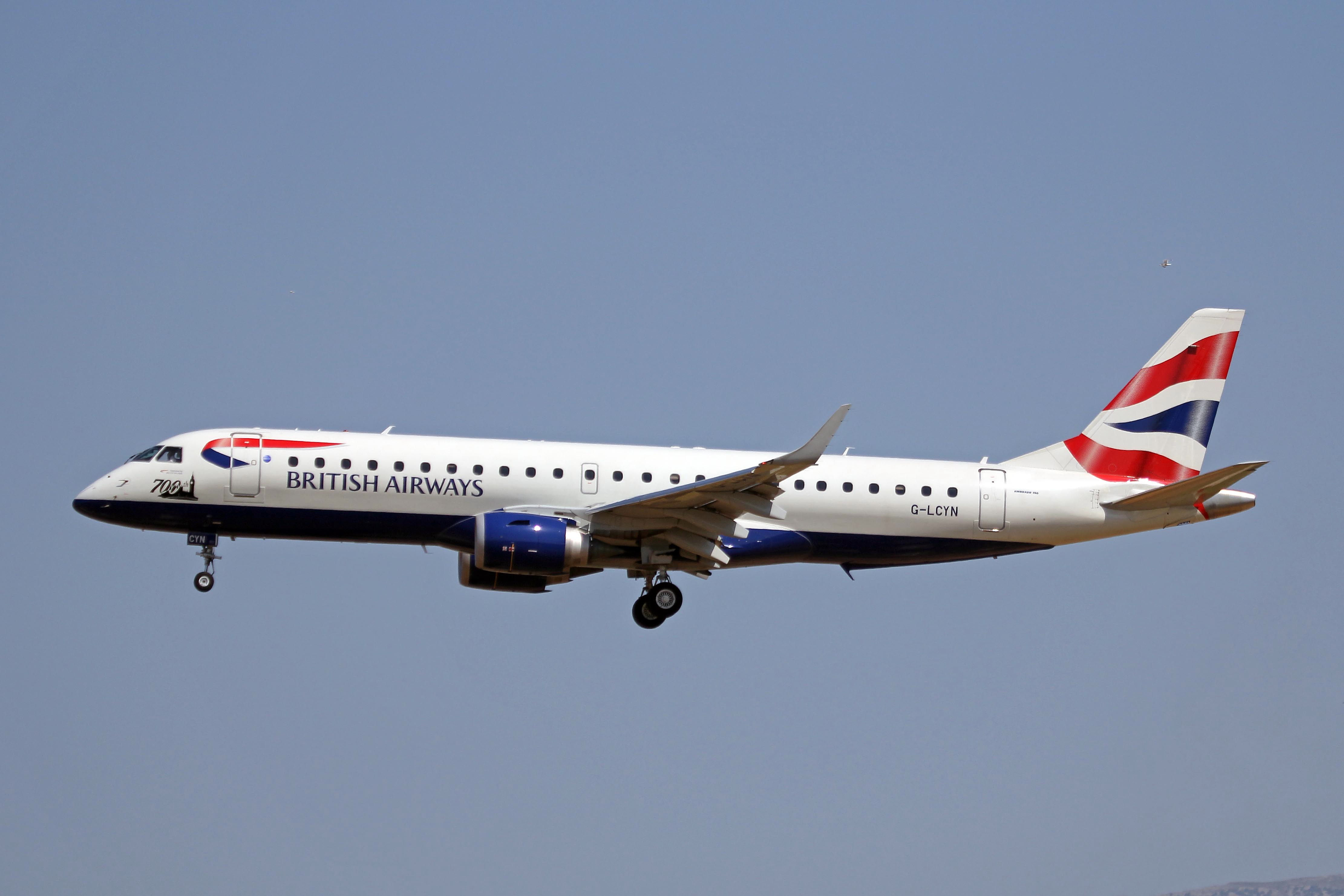
- BA Cityflyer Embraer E190 in standard livery
| IATA | ICAO | Call sign |
|---|---|---|
| CJ | CFE | FLYER |
- Founded: 25 March 2007; 19 years ago
- AOC #: 2314
- Operating bases: London City Airport, London Stansted Airport, Edinburgh Airport
- Frequent-flyer program: The British Airways Club (part of the Avios loyalty programme)
- Alliance: Oneworld (affiliate)
- Fleet size: 20
- Destinations: 33
- Parent company: British Airways
- Headquarters: Harmondsworth, England, United Kingdom
- Key people: Tom Stoddart (Managing Director)
- Website: www.britishairways.com

British Airways Cityflyer (BA Cityflyer), also styled BA CityFlyer, is a British regional airline, and a wholly owned subsidiary of British Airways with its head office based in Harmondsworth, in the London borough of Hillingdon. It operates a network of domestic and European services from its base at London City Airport. All services operate with BA's full colours, titles and flight numbers. BA Cityflyer Limited holds a United Kingdom Civil Aviation Authority Type A Operating Licence, meaning that it is permitted to carry passengers, cargo and mail on aircraft with 20 or more seats.

== History ==
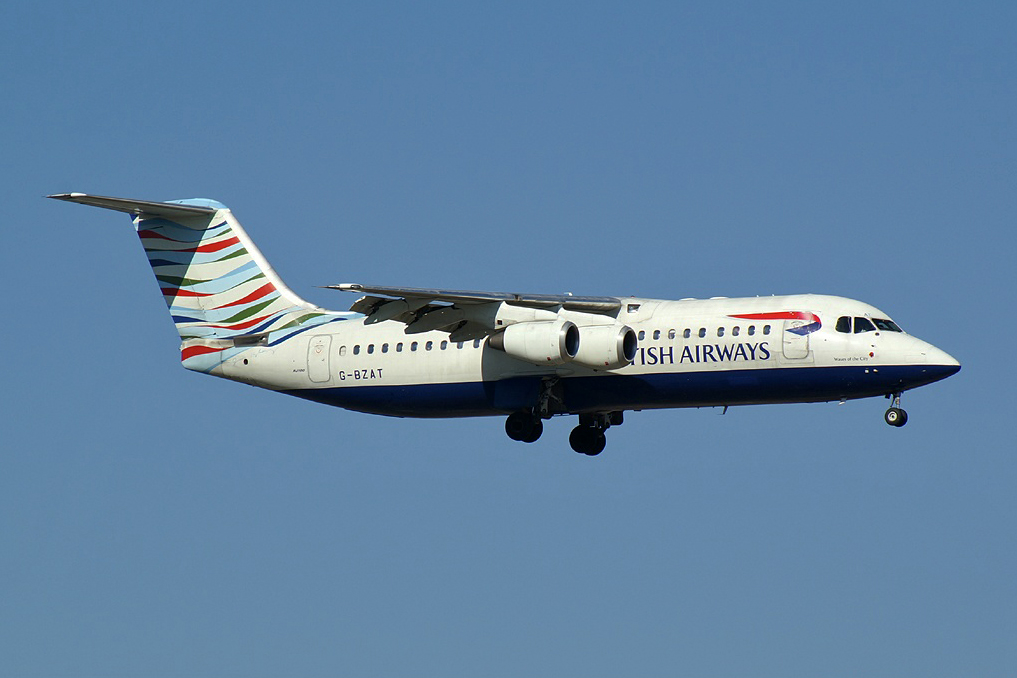
Former BA Cityflyer Avro RJ100 in 2005 wearing one of the British Airways ethnic liveries

British Airways' sale of BA Connect to Flybe in 2007 did not include the London City Airport operations and its associated fleet of ten Avro RJ100 regional jet aircraft. This led to British Airways' decision to resurrect erstwhile Gatwick-based CityFlyer Express (which BA had integrated into its Gatwick mainline short-haul operation in 2001, following the acquisition of CityFlyer Express in 1999) as a new wholly owned subsidiary to take over this operation, as of March 2007. BA Cityflyer was awarded an Air Operators Certificate on 8 February 2007, and started operations on 25 March 2007.

In summer 2008, two Avro RJ85 aircraft were added to the fleet for performance and economic reasons - this included overcoming payload restrictions in the summer that could limit existing aircraft to 60 passengers on some days.

In the second half of 2008, BA Cityflyer announced an order for 11 aircraft from the Embraer E-Jet family compromising of six 76 seat Embraer E170 and five 98 seat Embraer E190 aircraft, plus options for three additional Embraer E190s with the first aircraft due in the second half of 2009. The first Embraer E190 was received in 2010.

In February 2016, BA Cityflyer announced that it would commence operating flights from London-Stansted in May 2016. In January and February 2017, it announced that it would commence summer seasonal services from Manchester, Bristol, Edinburgh, Dublin and Birmingham to a variety of destinations in Spain, Italy, Greece and France. This marks the return of BA to the regions after an absence of nearly 10 years. Flights will also operate in the summer between London City and Manchester, operating with Embraer E190 aircraft.

In 2018, the airline reported nearly doubled profits, with profits increasing 28% and revenue up by 18%. Recently, the airline has pulled out from operating at both Birmingham and Bristol on weekends and has made several changes to its schedule increasing frequency and adding new services to Rome.

In July 2020, in light of the COVID-19 pandemic it was announced that the crew base at Edinburgh Airport would close on 31 October 2020, with the loss of several ground based office jobs and the option for cabin crew and pilots to relocate to London City Airport. On 9 December 2020, it was announced that BA Cityflyer would operate from Southampton Airport starting in May 2021 with flights to 14 European destinations mostly operating on weekends.

BA Cityflyer announced in September 2024 that it would withdraw its remaining services to Southampton Airport, having already ended all winter 2024 flights.

== Destinations ==
In addition to their scheduled flights from London City, the airline also operates a number of scheduled and charter flights from Edinburgh, Glasgow, London-Stansted and Belfast City airports primarily to leisure destinations. The airline focuses on serving the financial market, though it has recently expanded into the leisure market, offering routes to Ibiza, Palma and Venice. In 2021, BA Cityflyer started operating 14 weekend flights from Southampton.

As of October 2024, BA Cityflyer operates scheduled and charter flights to the following destinations:

| Country | City | Airport | Notes | Refs |
|---|---|---|---|---|
| Austria | Salzburg | Salzburg Airport | Seasonal | |
| Croatia | Split | Split Airport | Seasonal | |
| Czech Republic | Prague | Václav Havel Airport Prague | Seasonal | |
| Denmark | Copenhagen | Copenhagen Airport | Terminated | |
| France | Bergerac | Bergerac Dordogne Périgord Airport | Seasonal | |
| France | Calvi | Calvi–Sainte-Catherine Airport | Seasonal Charter | |
| France | Chambéry | Chambéry Airport | Seasonal | |
| France | Limoges | Limoges–Bellegarde Airport | Terminated | |
| France | Lyon | Lyon–Saint-Exupéry Airport | Terminated | |
| France | Nice | Nice Côte d'Azur Airport | Seasonal | |
| France | Paris | Orly Airport | Terminated | |
| France | Quimper | Quimper–Bretagne Airport | Terminated | |
| Germany | Berlin | Berlin Brandenburg Airport | | |
| Germany | Bremen | Bremen Airport | Terminated | |
| Germany | Düsseldorf | Düsseldorf Airport | Terminated | |
| Germany | Frankfurt | Frankfurt Airport | | |
| Germany | Hamburg | Hamburg Airport | Terminated | |
| Germany | Munich | Munich Airport | Terminated | |
| Gibraltar | Gibraltar | Gibraltar International Airport | Terminated | |
| Guernsey | Guernsey | Guernsey Airport | Seasonal Charter | |
| Greece | Mykonos | Mykonos Airport | Terminated | |
| Greece | Santorini | Santorini International Airport | Terminated | |
| Greece | Skiathos | Skiathos International Airport | Seasonal | |
| Greece | Thessaloniki | Thessaloniki Airport | Seasonal | |
| Iceland | Reykjavík | Keflavík International Airport | Terminated | |
| Ireland | Dublin | Dublin Airport | | |
| Isle of Man | Douglas | Isle of Man Airport | Seasonal Charter | |
| Italy | Florence | Florence Airport | | |
| Italy | Milan | Linate Airport | | |
| Italy | Milan | Milan Malpensa Airport | Terminated | |
| Italy | Rome | Rome Fiumicino Airport | Terminated | |
| Italy | Venice | Venice Marco Polo Airport | Terminated | |
| Italy | Verona | Verona Villafranca Airport | Terminated | |
| Jersey | St Helier | Jersey Airport | Seasonal Charter | |
| Luxembourg | Luxembourg City | Luxembourg Airport | Terminated | |
| Netherlands | Amsterdam | Amsterdam Airport Schiphol | | |
| Netherlands | Rotterdam | Rotterdam The Hague Airport | | |
| Poland | Warsaw | Warsaw Chopin Airport | Terminated | |
| Portugal | Faro | Faro Airport | Seasonal | |
| Spain | Barcelona | Josep Tarradellas Barcelona–El Prat Airport | | |
| Spain | Granada | Federico García Lorca Granada Airport | Terminated | |
| Spain | Ibiza | Ibiza Airport | | |
| Spain | Málaga | Málaga Airport | Seasonal | |
| Spain | Madrid | Madrid–Barajas Airport | Terminated | |
| Spain | Menorca | Menorca Airport | Terminated | |
| Spain | Palma de Mallorca | Palma de Mallorca Airport | | |
| Spain | San Sebastián | San Sebastián Airport | | |
| Switzerland | Geneva | Geneva Airport | Seasonal | |
| Switzerland | Zürich | Zurich Airport | | |
| United Kingdom | Aberdeen | Aberdeen Airport | Terminated | |
| United Kingdom | Belfast | Belfast City Airport | | |
| United Kingdom | Birmingham | Birmingham Airport | Terminated | |
| United Kingdom | Edinburgh | Edinburgh Airport | | |
| United Kingdom | Exeter | Exeter Airport | Terminated | |
| United Kingdom | Glasgow | Glasgow Airport | | |
| United Kingdom | Leeds/Bradford | Leeds Bradford Airport | Terminated | |
| United Kingdom | London | Gatwick Airport | Seasonal | |
| United Kingdom | London | London City Airport | Base | |
| United Kingdom | London | London Stansted Airport | Base | |
| United Kingdom | Manchester | Manchester Airport | Terminated | |
| United Kingdom | Newquay | Newquay Airport | Terminated | |
| United Kingdom | Southampton | Southampton Airport | Terminated | |

== Fleet ==
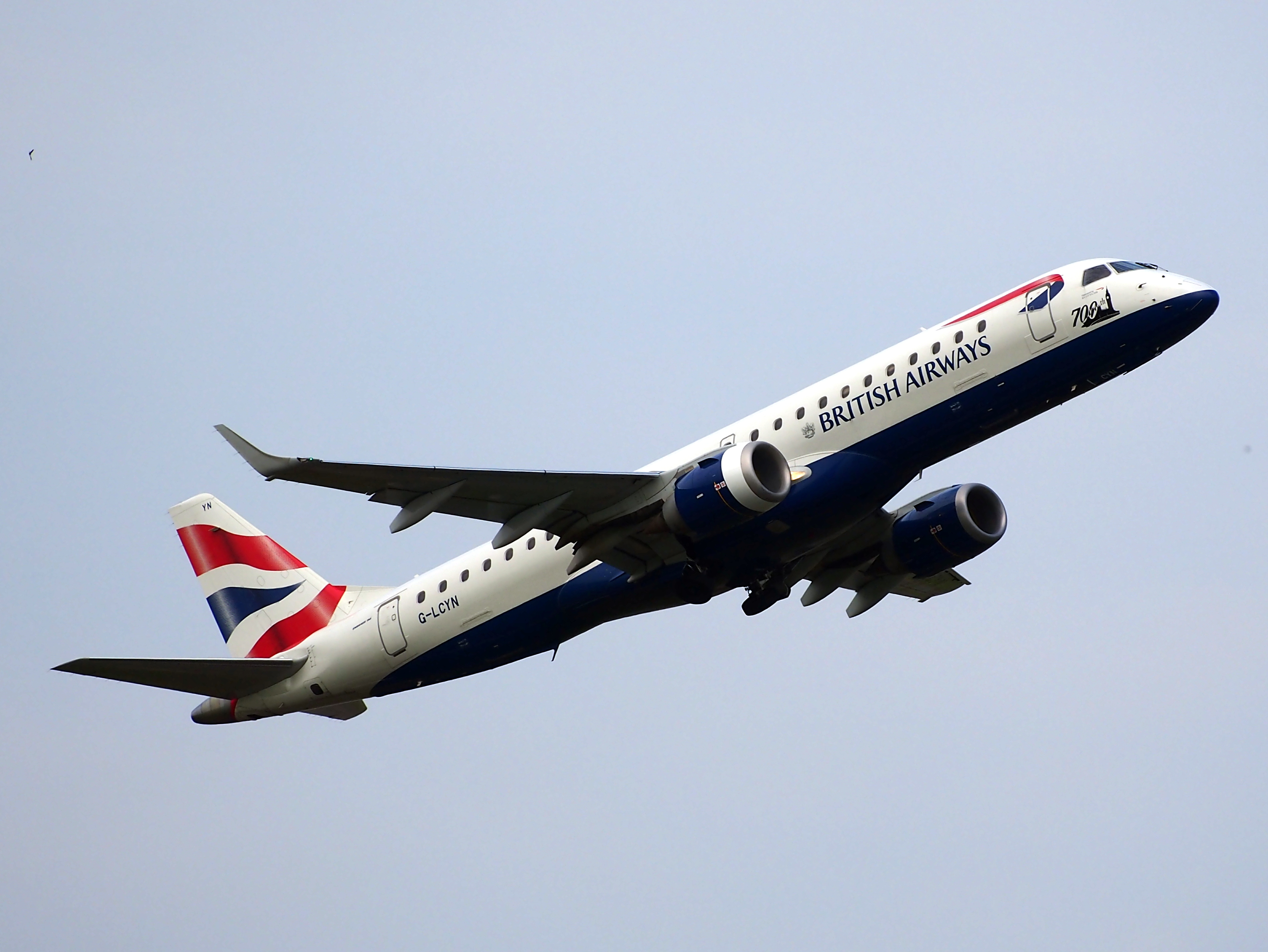
BA Cityflyer Embraer E190

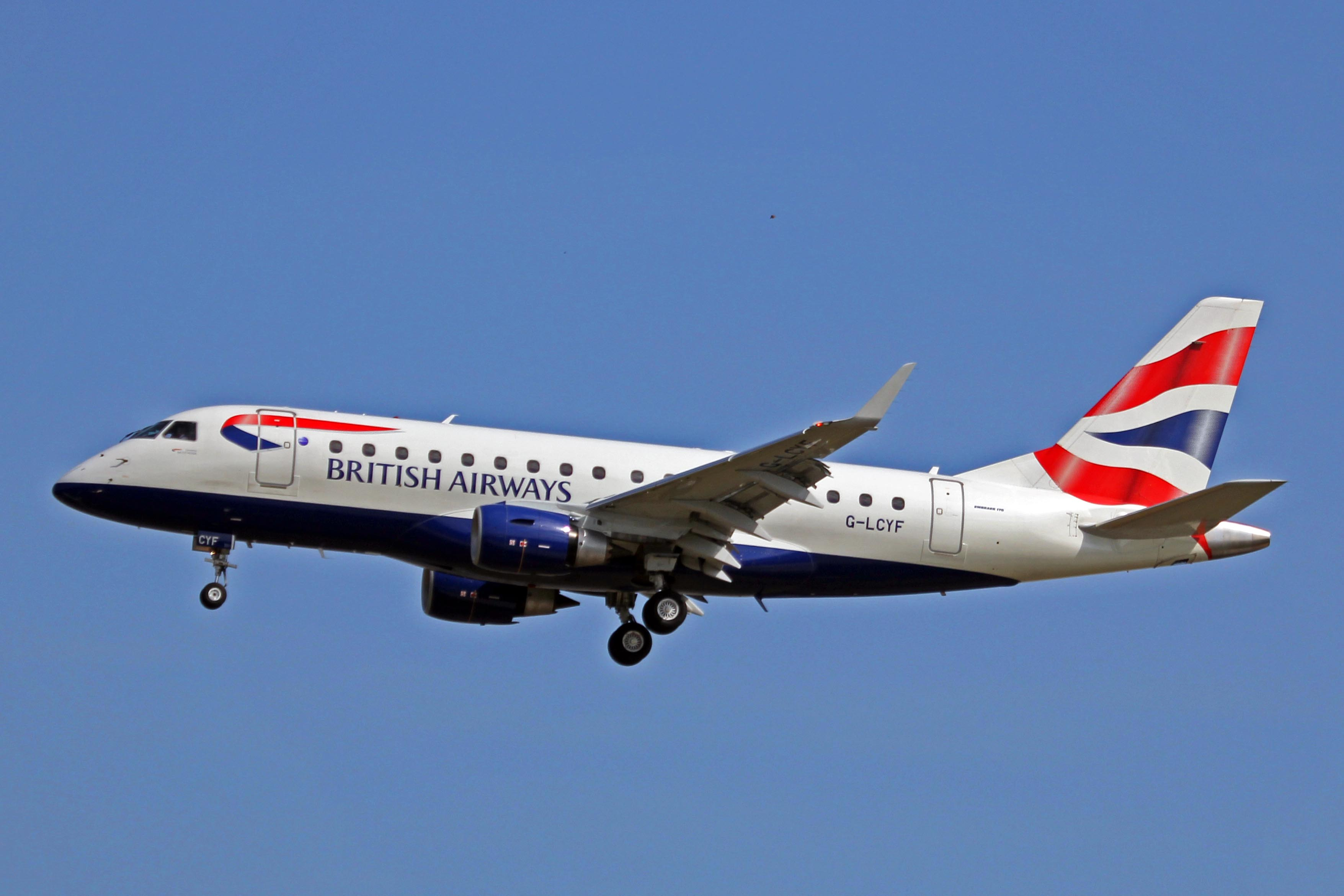
A former BA Cityflyer Embraer E170, phased-out in 2021

=== Current fleet ===
As of August 2025, BA CityFlyer operates the following aircraft:

BA Cityflyer fleet
| Aircraft | In service | Orders | Passengers | Notes |
|---|---|---|---|---|
| Embraer E190 | 20 | — | 106 | |
| Total | 20 | — | | |

=== Former fleet ===
In the past, BA Cityflyer operated the following aircraft:

| Aircraft | Total | Introduced | Retired | References |
|---|---|---|---|---|
| Avro RJ85 | 2 | 2008 | 2010 | |
| Avro RJ100 | 10 | 2007 | 2010 | |
| Embraer E170 | 6 | 2009 | 2021 | |

== Statistics ==
BA Cityflyer carried over 2.8 million passengers in 2019, a 4.8% increase from 2018.

| Year | Total passengers | Total flights | Load factor | Passenger change YoY |
|---|---|---|---|---|
| 2008 | 713,670 | 15,687 | 43.9% | |
| 2009 | 699,670 | 14,197 | 49.0% | ▼2.0% |
| 2010 | 798,523 | 14,330 | 66.0% | ▲14.1% |
| 2011 | 1,125,758 | 19,099 | 68.0% | ▲41.0% |
| 2012 | 1,184,810 | 21,745 | 65.2% | ▲5.2% |
| 2013 | 1,371,993 | 23,893 | 69.3% | ▲15.8% |
| 2014 | 1,710,920 | 29,326 | 71.0% | ▲24.7% |
| 2015 | 1,933,155 | 32,805 | 72.0% | ▲13.0% |
| 2016 | 2,192,847 | 36,351 | 72.8% | ▲13.4% |
| 2017 | 2,379,942 | 37,143 | 73.5% | ▲8.5% |
| 2018 | 2,697,956 | 41,068 | 75.3% | ▲13.4% |
| 2019 | 2,827,616 | 42,406 | 73.9% | ▲4.8% |
| 2020 | 500,001 | 8,929 | 61.2% | ▼82.3% |
^{Source: UK Civil Aviation Authority}

== Accidents and incidents ==
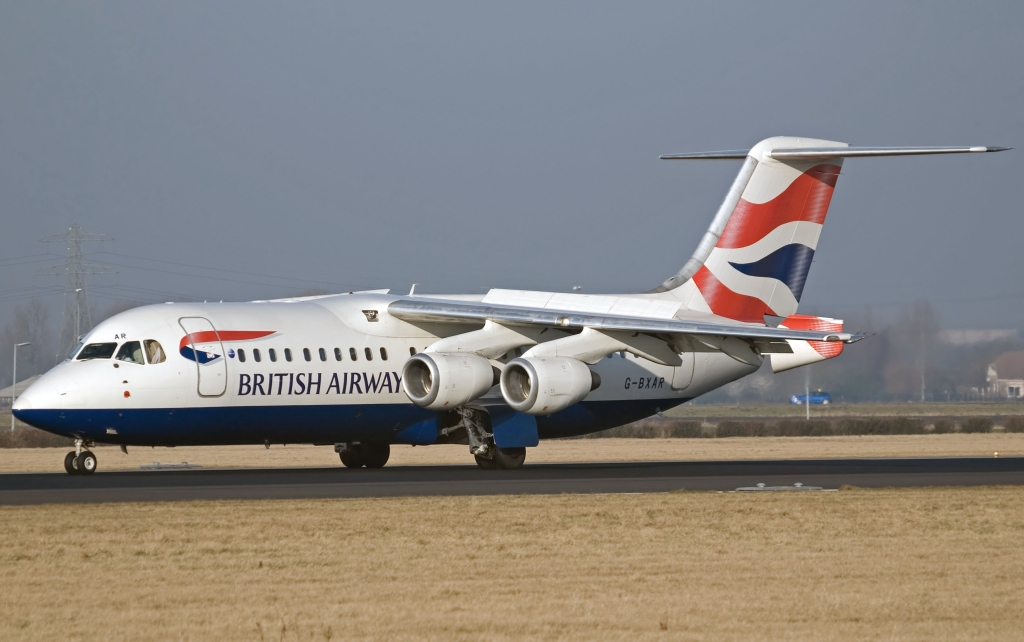
The BA Cityflyer Avro RJ100 involved in the February 2009 incident

On 13 February 2009, BA Cityflyer Flight 8456 (an Avro RJ100, registered G-BXAR, flying from Amsterdam) suffered a nose-gear collapse whilst landing at London City Airport. None of the 67 passengers or five crew members were seriously injured in the incident, but three passengers suffered minor injuries, two of whom were kept in hospital overnight. After a normal approach the nose landing-gear fractured as it was lowered onto the runway, due to the presence of a fatigue-crack in the upper internal bore of the landing-gear main fitting. It was found that the crack had formed as a result of poor surface finish during manufacture, and the incomplete embodiment of a manufacturer's service bulletin, which the landing-gear maintenance records showed as being implemented at its last overhaul in June 2006. The aircraft was damaged beyond economic repair, and was written off by insurers in May 2009.

On January 4, 2025, BA Cityflyer Flight 7016, an Embraer E190 (G-LCAF) was flying from Florence Airport to London Stansted, when the left engine failed midflight and the crew had to shut it down and divert to Milan Malpensa airport. The plane landed safely; no one was injured. The plane was grounded at Terminal 2 for about a month awaiting an engine replacement.
