= CityFlyer Express =

British airline

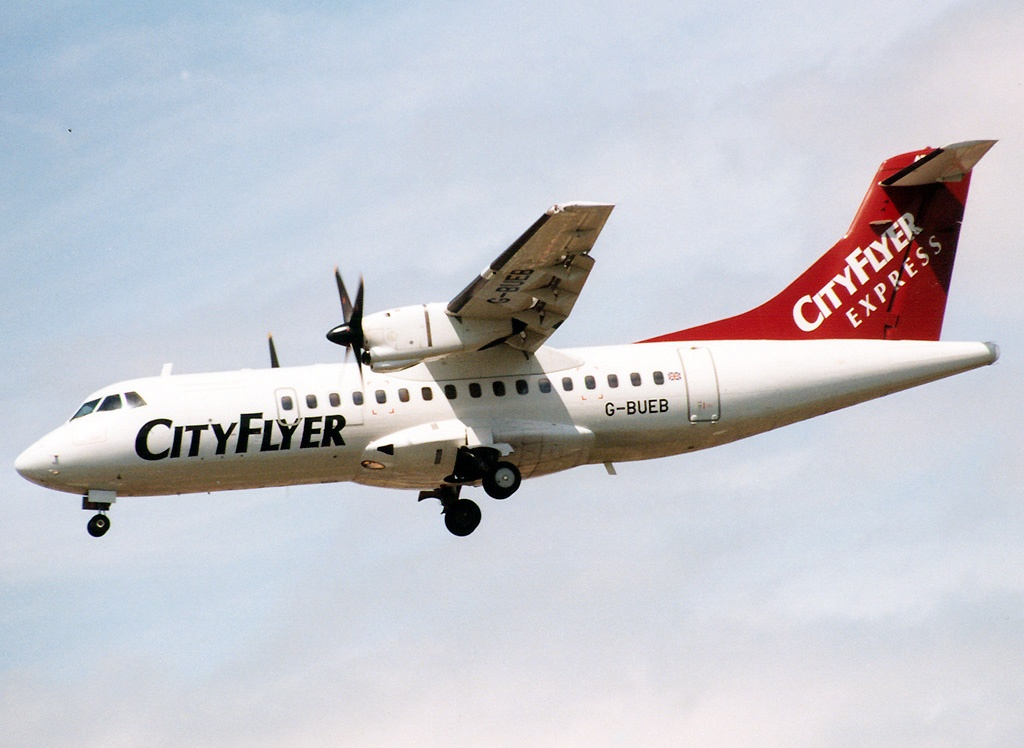
- ATR 42
IATA	ICAO	Call sign
CJ	CFE	FLYER
- Founded: 1991 (as Euroworld Airways)
- Commenced operations: February 1992 (as CityFlyer Express)
- Ceased operations: March 2002 (merged to form British Airways CitiExpress)
- Hubs: London City; London Gatwick
- Fleet size: 21 (16 Avro RJ100, 5 ATR 72 (as of late-2000))
- Destinations: British Isles, Continental Europe
- Parent company: British Airways
- Headquarters: Gatwick Airport; Crawley, England
- Key people: Brad Burgess, managing director Robert Wright, chairman

CityFlyer Express was a short-haul regional airline with its head office in the Iain Stewart Centre next to London Gatwick Airport in England. In August 1993 it became the first British Airways (BA) franchisee operating as British Airways Express. CityFlyer's ownership passed to BA in late 1999 when that company bought out the original promoters as well as 3i, the airline's main shareholder at the time.

== History ==
=== Euroworld Airways ===
The management of the (blocked from the outside) Air Europe Express in March 1991 started a new airline, Euroworld Airways, and began operations in early May using two Shorts 360 aircraft, helped by the staff from the old Air Europe Express. The new air carrier inherited also night freight and mail contracts from the defunct airline. On 1 July the regional airline began scheduled flights from Gatwick to Guernsey, Antwerp and Rotterdam, for which two additional Shorts 360s were purchased. At this time, the airline approached several large carriers with a view to establishing a link, but in the event only British Airways was to show any interest, and a code share agreement was struck between the two. In the meanwhile the airline was renamed CityFlyer Express Ltd. in February 1992.

=== CityFlyer Express ===
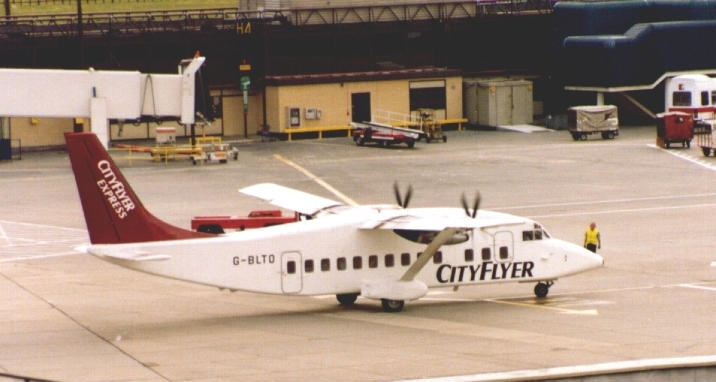
Short 360

1992 also marked CityFlyer's second year of operation, during which it managed to break even for the first time. From this point onwards, the airline was to post a consistent profit. CityFlyer Express was the UK launch customer for the ATR 42 regional turboprop, acquiring two in 1992. In the same year Aer Lingus abandoned the Gatwick to Dublin service, allowing CityFlyer to step in with a daily service. British Airways' takeover of Dan-Air also left the Gatwick to Newcastle route vacant for the airline to assume, offering a three-times daily service and requiring a third ATR 42. The addition of Düsseldorf to the network in 1993 and a frequency increase on the Dublin route led to the acquisition of a fourth ATR.

==== Code-sharing with British Airways ====
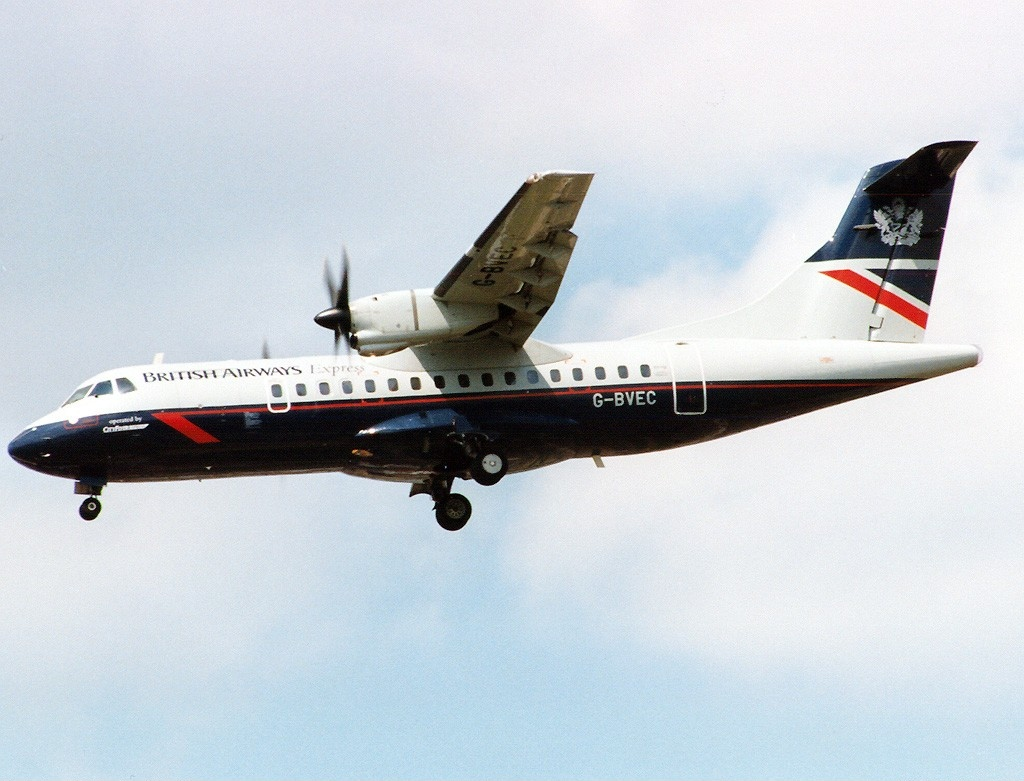
ATR 42

Meanwhile, the code share agreement had resulted in several complaints being lodged with British Airways by customers expecting a BA flight and the BA product. BA proposed a solution to this by offering CityFlyer a franchise agreement, which was accepted. This occasion marked the conclusion of the first-ever franchise agreement between British Airways and another airline. It also marked the conclusion of the first franchise agreement in the UK airline industry. Under this arrangement the CityFlyer aircraft would be painted in full BA livery with interiors and cabin layout conforming to BA's contemporary, standard two-class European product. Staff would wear BA uniforms and all flights would operate under BA flight numbers. British Airways itself would take over CityFlyer's marketing and handle all reservations on its behalf. To all intents and purposes, CityFlyer Express would present itself and trade as British Airways. The deal came into effect in August 1993 and British Airways Express brand adopted. The franchise agreement allowed CityFlyer Express to take advantage of the UK flag carrier's marketing clout, pricing power as well as its global distribution system (GDS) and worldwide sales force.

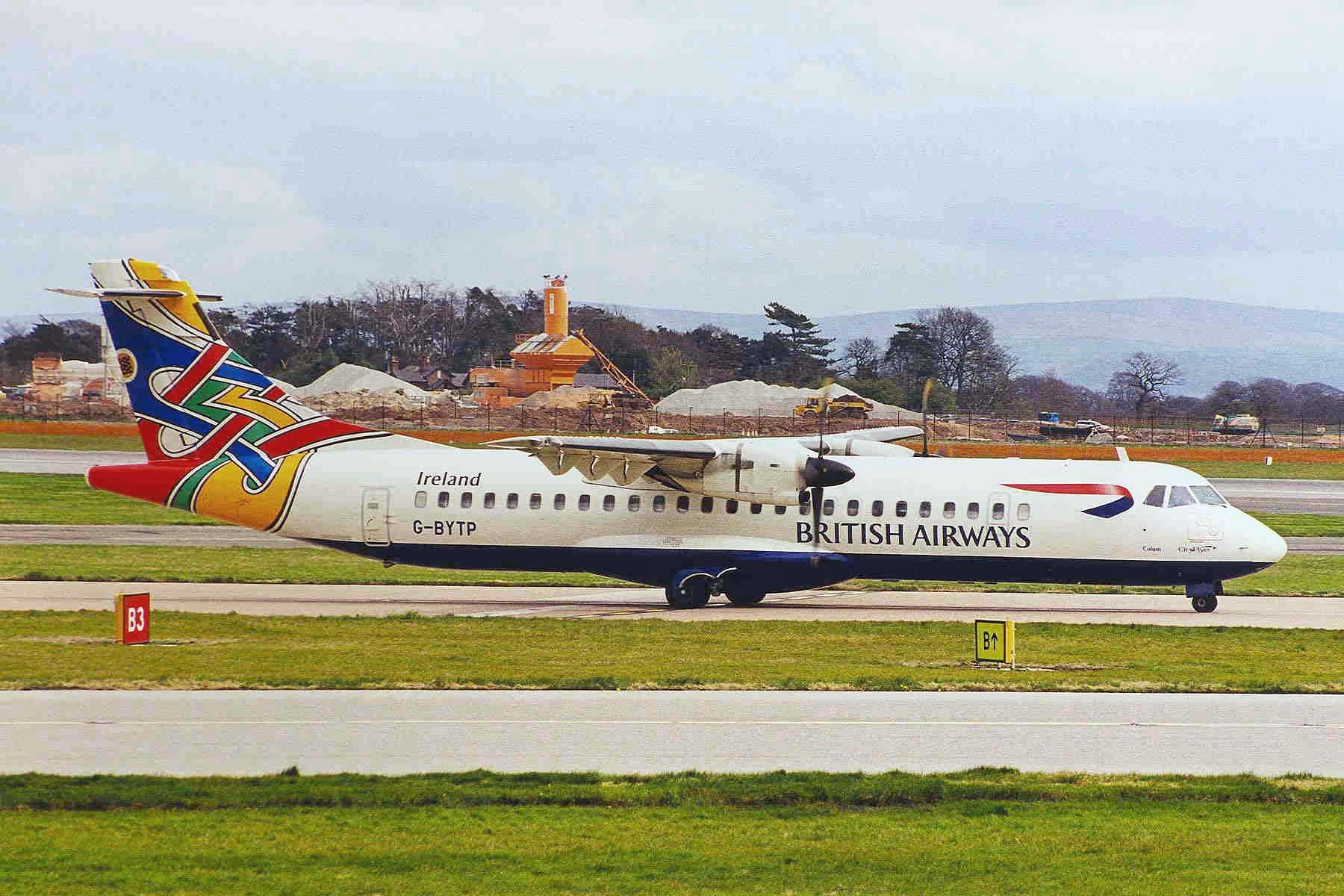
ATR 72

The airline was again UK launch customer for the larger, 66-seat ATR 72, the first of which was delivered in October 1994. By the end of the 1995 financial year, CityFlyer served ten destinations.

==== Entering the jet age ====
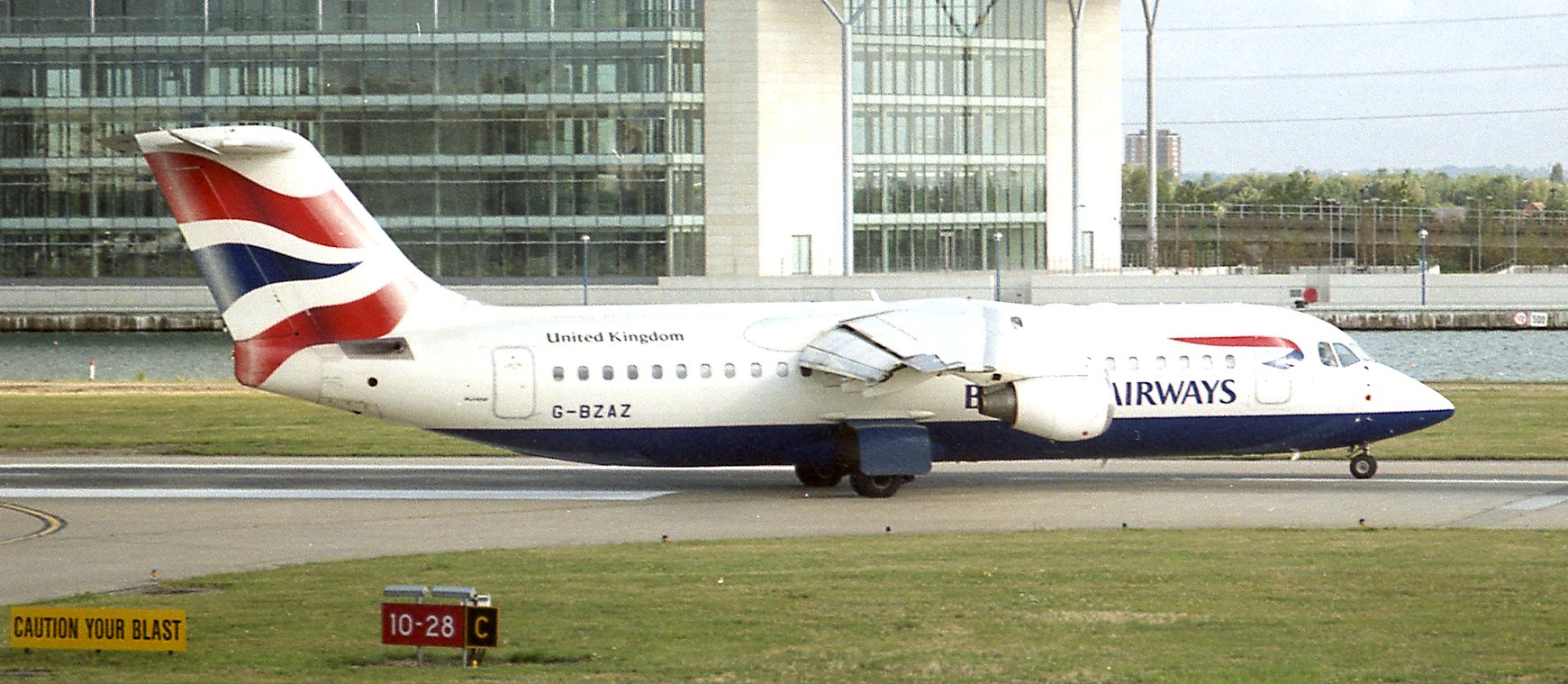
Avro RJ100

CityFlyer Express acquired its first jet aircraft in March 1997 when it became the first UK-based airline to introduce the Avro RJ100 and a second was acquired in May of that year. Three more were added in 1998 and a further two joined the fleet in 1999. At the time, the airline also operated six ATR 42s, one of which was returned to its lessor in 1999, as well as five larger ATR 72s. Three additional ATR 72s were delivered in 1999. Eventually, these replaced the remaining ATR 42s. By the turn of the millennium the company's jet fleet had expanded to 16 RJ100s.

==== Selling out to British Airways ====
With the franchise agreement due to end in 1999, CityFlyer Express was the second largest slot holder at Gatwick Airport (behind British Airways). It held 96 daily slots at Gatwick, employed 677 people and returned a pre-tax profit of £6.4mn on sales of £89.4mn. The airline's shareholders took the opportunity to regain their investment and put the airline up for sale. HSBC was appointed to handle the process, and approached a number of carriers about the sale. Of the airlines approached, both British Airways and Virgin Atlantic stated their interest to acquire the airline. At the time Virgin chairman Richard Branson attacked British Airways' intention to bid for CityFlyer Express by claiming publicly that it already had a "total monopoly" at Heathrow and now wanted a "total monopoly" at Gatwick as well, thereby undermining its rivals' ability to compete with it on a level playing field.

Disregarding a publicly stated offer from Virgin Atlantic to purchase the company for £100mn, HSBC announced the sale of CityFlyer Express to Virgin's arch-rival British Airways for £75mn in November 1998. This immediately caused controversy, with Richard Branson stating that HSBC never responded to Virgin's offer despite numerous requests from Virgin. CityFlyer's management defended its decision to sell to British Airways by stating that it had never received Virgin's offer in the first place. This resulted in the already agreed takeover of CityFlyer Express by British Airways being referred to the Competition Commission. The Competition Commission eventually cleared the sale of CityFlyer Express to British Airways for £75mn in late 1999. However, it also imposed a ceiling on the maximum number of slots British Airways and its newly acquired subsidiary CityFlyer Express were allowed to hold at Gatwick.

According to this ruling, British Airways and CityFlyer could control a combined maximum of 41% of all Gatwick slots on an annual basis as well as no more than 70% of the airport's slots on an hourly basis and up to 65% of these slots within a two-hour time span. These limits were designed to enable other airlines to offer competitive schedules on short haul routes where British Airways or CityFlyer was the sole or dominant carrier, without resorting to compulsory slot transfers that would have impeded British Airways' ability to run an effective hub-and-spoke operation at Gatwick.

==== Background to British Airways' acquisition of CityFlyer Express ====
The main reason for British Airways' acquisition of CityFlyer Express was that CityFlyer held about 13% of Gatwick slots at the time. BA did not want these to fall into any competitor's hands. BA also needed CityFlyer's slots to expand its Gatwick operation so that it could offer enough feeder services that would help it turn around its loss-making operation at the airport by improving long haul load factors. CityFlyer and its predecessor Connectair/Air Europe Express had a proven track record of operating a network of regional domestic and European scheduled services from Gatwick profitably. This was in stark contrast to BA's mainline short haul operation at Gatwick, which had racked up huge losses ever since BA had established a major presence at Gatwick as a result of the British Caledonian and Dan-Air takeovers.

After the failed attempt to use the acquisition of Dan-Air to form a new low-cost, short haul unit within BA's mainline short haul operation at Gatwick, franchising seemed to offer the best solution for providing the level of feeder services BA needed to protect its long-haul loads and profits at Gatwick, without re-creating the complex organisation and fleet mix, and without duplicating the costly overheads of the BA mainline short haul operation at Heathrow, which did not suit the revenue environment at Gatwick.

Apart from the additional transfer traffic this generated for BA's long haul services at Gatwick, the main benefit of this arrangement for BA was that CityFlyer was to remain completely independent of the BA mainline operation. The feeder services CityFlyer provided for BA under the franchise agreement did not impact the direct operating costs of BA's mainline operation. CityFlyer also had very low costs as a result of a flat organisational structure and a simple fleet.

===== Project Jupiter =====
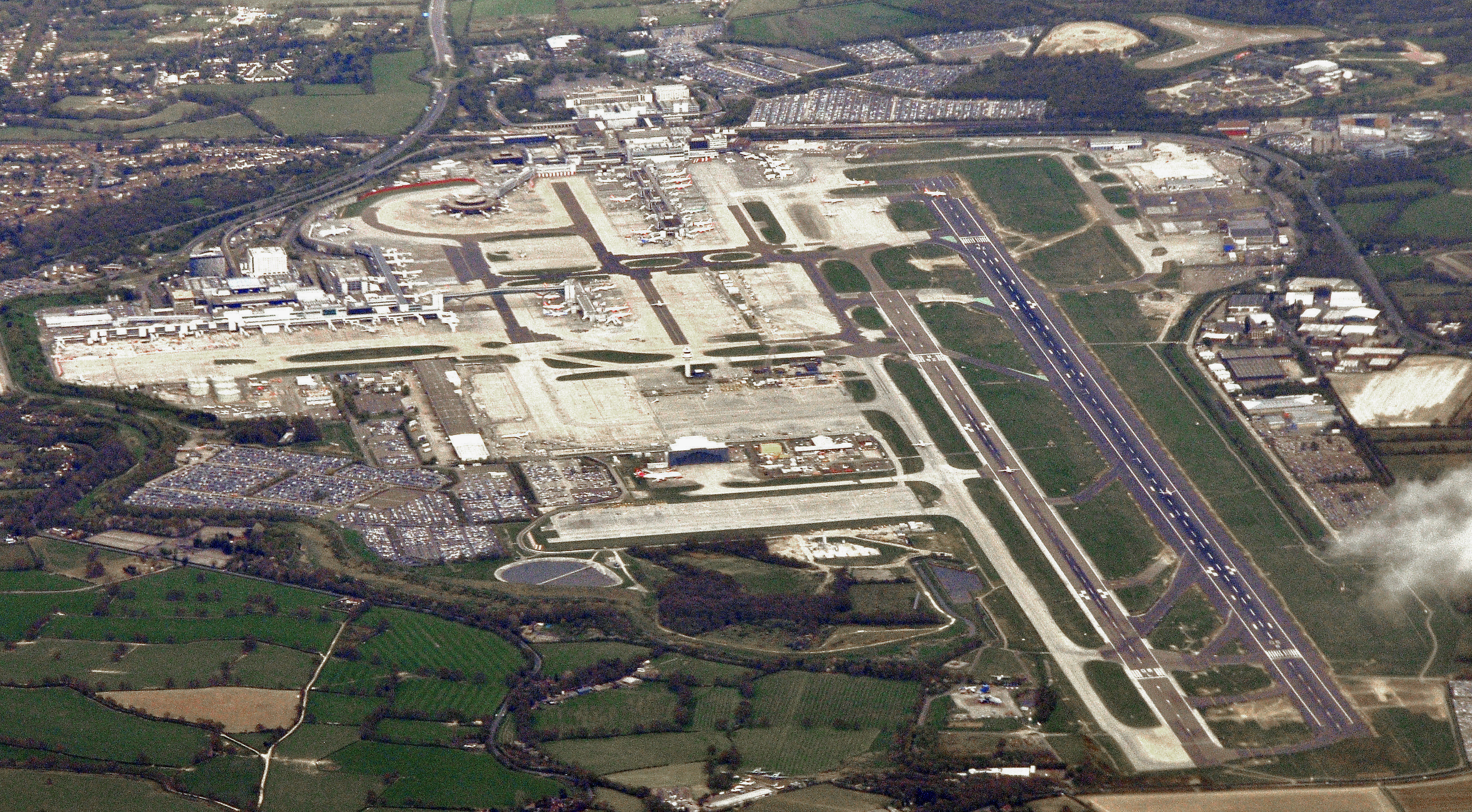
Gatwick Airport

Project "Jupiter" was BA's internal working title for the strategy it had devised to turn the struggling Gatwick operation into a fully fledged hub. Within three years from the launch of Project "Jupiter", the BA mainline operation more than doubled the number of long haul aircraft at Gatwick and increased the number of short haul aircraft at the airport by more than half. In addition, the airline's franchisees, notably CityFlyer Express and GB Airways, increased their Gatwick-based fleets as well. The role BA had assigned its franchisees generally and CityFlyer in particular to make Project "Jupiter" work was to provide feeder services that were expected to be profitable in their own right and enable transfer passengers to connect at ease with BA's long haul services at Gatwick.

By the turn of the millennium, CityFlyer Express and the other BA franchisees as well as its subsidiaries and partner airlines at Gatwick accounted for 1,000 of these passengers each day.

Ultimately, BA's attempt to make its Gatwick operation profitable by building it up into a full-scale hub-and-spoke operation failed. In October 2000 the airline publicly announced its decision to de-hub Gatwick and to turn it into a regional Southeast airport primarily serving leisure-orientated point-to-point routes where most of the demand originated in the Gatwick catchment area<.

==== British Airways' short haul reorganisation ====
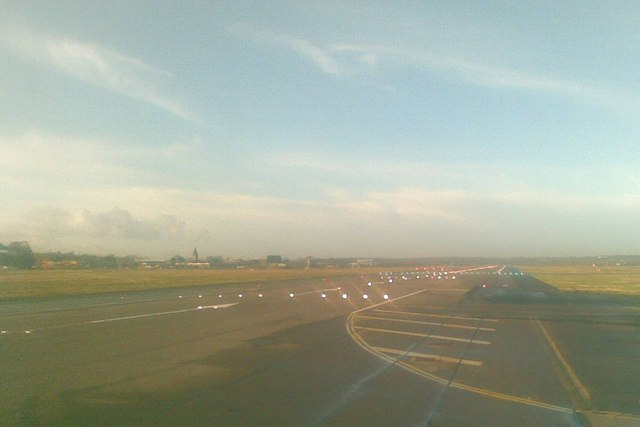
Gatwick Airport runway

Under the franchise agreement it had concluded with BA before being taken over in 1999, CityFlyer Express initially operated as an independent business unit within British Airways serving a number of short haul European and UK regional routes from Gatwick that were completely separate from the services BA's mainline operation provided. However, following BA's decision to abandon its hub-and-spoke strategy at Gatwick in October 2000, CityFlyer was subsumed into British Airways' mainline operation at Gatwick in 2001, thereby ceasing to exist as a separate entity. There were reasons for fully integrating CityFlyer into BA's mainline short haul operation at Gatwick.

The main one of these was operational. Although CityFlyer remained a profitable business in its own right following its 1999 acquisition, BA found that franchising overall had not been the financial success it had hoped. There were too many franchisees whose administrative and sales support actually cost the airline more than the additional revenue resulting from franchise fees and the connecting traffic its franchise partners generated. Therefore, as far as the bigger picture was concerned, BA's senior management felt that the franchise agreements with its various franchisees, all of which were profitable in their own right, had benefited the franchisees more than itself. Therefore, BA's senior management decided that it was prudent to reduce the number of franchise agreements and to make use of franchisees only if it gave BA a presence in markets it did not already serve itself and where there was no prospect of providing such a service profitably through its mainline operation.

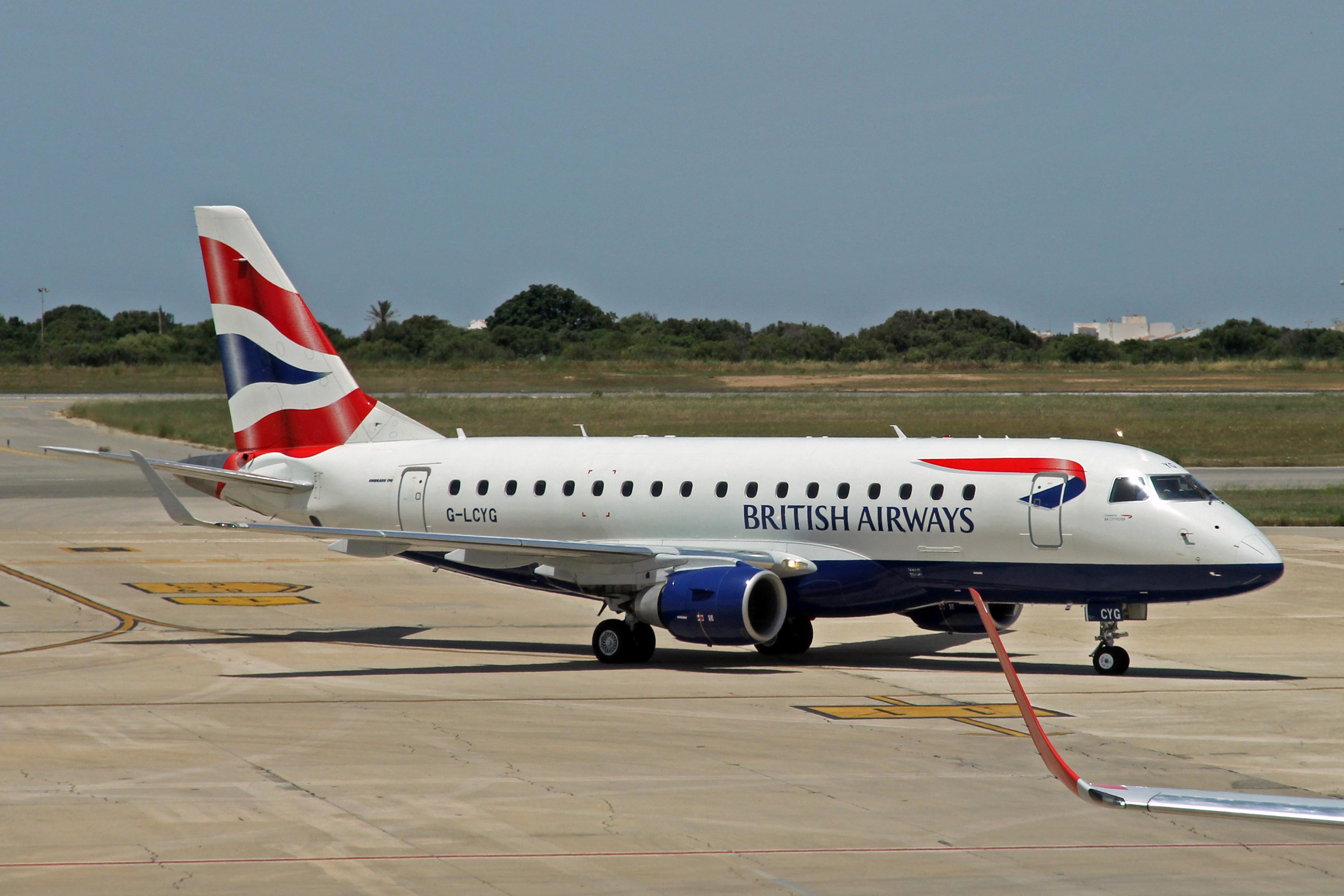
EMB-170

.

Following the integration of CityFlyer Express into BA's mainline short haul operation at Gatwick, all former CityFlyer employees other than flight crew and engineers working on the jet fleet were made redundant. The flight crew and engineers whom BA continued to employ were transferred along with their equipment to BA's regional bases in Birmingham and Manchester. BA's subsequent decision to retire the former CityFlyer turboprop fleet, resulted in the withdrawal of the airline's services from Gatwick to Antwerp, Guernsey and Rotterdam.

At the same time, British Regional Airlines (BRAL), another British Airways franchise operator based on the Isle of Man, was acquired by British Airways as well and in March 2002 was merged with British Airways' wholly owned regional subsidiary Brymon Airways to form British Airways Citiexpress, which would assume the operation of domestic and European services from UK regional airports from the following September. On 1 February 2006, British Airways Citiexpress was renamed BA Connect.

== See also ==
- List of defunct airlines of the United Kingdom
