= BA Connect =

Regional airline of the United Kingdom (1993–2007)

- Avro RJ100
IATA	ICAO	Call sign
TH	BRT	BRITISH
- Founded: 30 July 1993
- Commenced operations: 1 February 2006 (as BA Connect)
- Ceased operations: 25 March 2007 (sold to Flybe)
- Operating bases: Belfast–City; Birmingham; Bristol; Cardiff; Edinburgh; Glasgow; Guernsey; Isle of Man; Jersey; Manchester; Newcastle upon Tyne; Southampton
- Frequent-flyer program: Executive Club
- Alliance: Oneworld (affiliate; 1999–2007)
- Parent company: British Airways (1993–2007); Flybe (2007)
- Headquarters: Didsbury, Manchester, England
- Website: www.britishairways.com

BA Connect was a regional airline and a wholly owned subsidiary airline of British Airways. It was headquartered in Didsbury, Manchester, England, it operated a network of domestic and European services from a number of airports in the United Kingdom on behalf of British Airways. The airline operated as a low-cost carrier, with food sold via a 'buy on board' programme (except for flights to London City Airport).

On 3 November 2006, British Airways announced the sale of BA Connect to Flybe. It formally transferred operations to Flybe on 25 March 2007.

== History ==
In March 2002 British Airways Citiexpress ltd. was established by merging Brymon Aviation (Brymon Airways), a British Airways subsidiary from 1993, with BRAL-British Regional Airlines and with CityFlyer Express. Operations were started on 31 March. The new regional airline was almost immediately known as BA Connect, which became the registered corporate name on 1 February 2006.

The regional operations of British Airways at Birmingham and Manchester, were integrated into the new airline later in 2002. The air carrier was recognised for pioneering and attaining CAA approval for the print-at-home boarding pass, one of the first self-service tools of the digital era.

On 1 February 2006 the airline was renamed BA Connect Ltd. operating as BA Connect and operations moved to a low-cost carrier model, with food sold via a 'buy on board' programme (except for flights to London City Airport). However, allocated seating and a baggage valet service were still available, while lounge access, tier points and BA Miles remained unaffected for those in the Executive Club. Operationally the new service came into effect on 26 March 2006.

BA Connect handled most of British Airways' domestic and European services that do not serve London’s Heathrow or Gatwick airports. It had hubs in Birmingham, Bristol, London–City, Manchester and Southampton. From these locations the carrier operated services to several northwest European destinations and also to Glasgow, Edinburgh and Aberdeen. A few services also operated from Gatwick. In total, BA Connect flew from 17 airports in the UK and Ireland on 63 routes to major or central regional airports.

On 3 November 2006, British Airways chief executive said that he had reached an agreement for Flybe to purchase BA Connect. BA would ensure that Flybe has sufficient funding in order to achieve its growth targets and the transition out of current BA Connect fleet. In return BA would acquire a 15% stake in the new business. The acquisition (which did not include BA Connect routes to London City or from Manchester to New York) would significantly increase the Flybe route network in both the UK and continental Europe, making Flybe the largest regional airline in Europe. Retention of the London City routes would result in BA retaining the RJ100 aircraft for these domestic and European services. BA had to pay Flybe a sum of money to take on the company due to Flybe actually taking on a company that would cost them money rather than make profits for the foreseeable future.

Much concern was expressed at the shedding of routes across Scotland, but Flybe stated that BA Connect routes would be kept and expanded. On 6 March 2007 Flybe stated that they would not be operating any former BA Connect services from Bristol. Consequently, the last flights on any of BA Connect's routes from Bristol was on 24 March 2007.

== Services ==
BA Connect operated from several destinations that were also served by the parent company, and were part of British Airways destinations. Those that were not served by British Airways itself, mainly UK regional destinations, are listed in British Airways franchise destinations.

== Fleet ==
The BA Connect fleet included the following aircraft, before the sale to British European Airways/Flybe in March 2007:

- 1 x BAe 146-100 (transferred to Flybe)
- 2 x BAe 146-200 (transferred to Flybe)
- 1 x BAe 146-300 (transferred to Flybe)
- 10 x Avro RJ100 (transferred to BA CityFlyer)
- 6 x Bombardier Dash 8 Q300 (transferred to Flybe)
- 28 x Embraer ERJ 145 (transferred to Flybe)

== Gallery ==
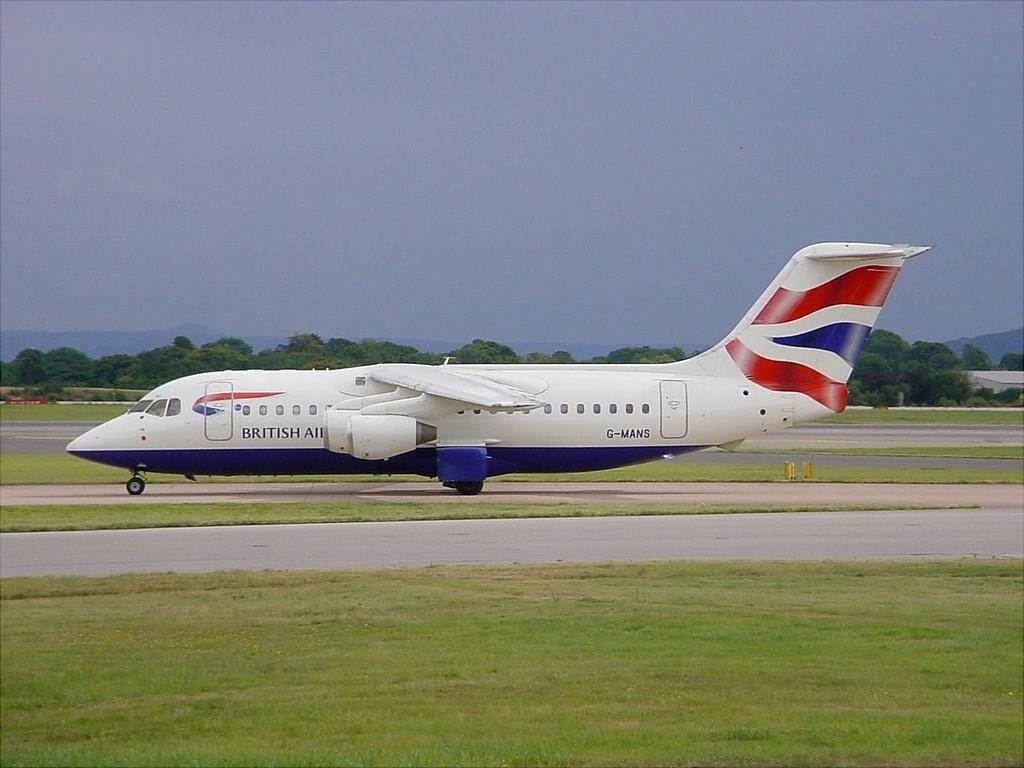
BAe 146-200

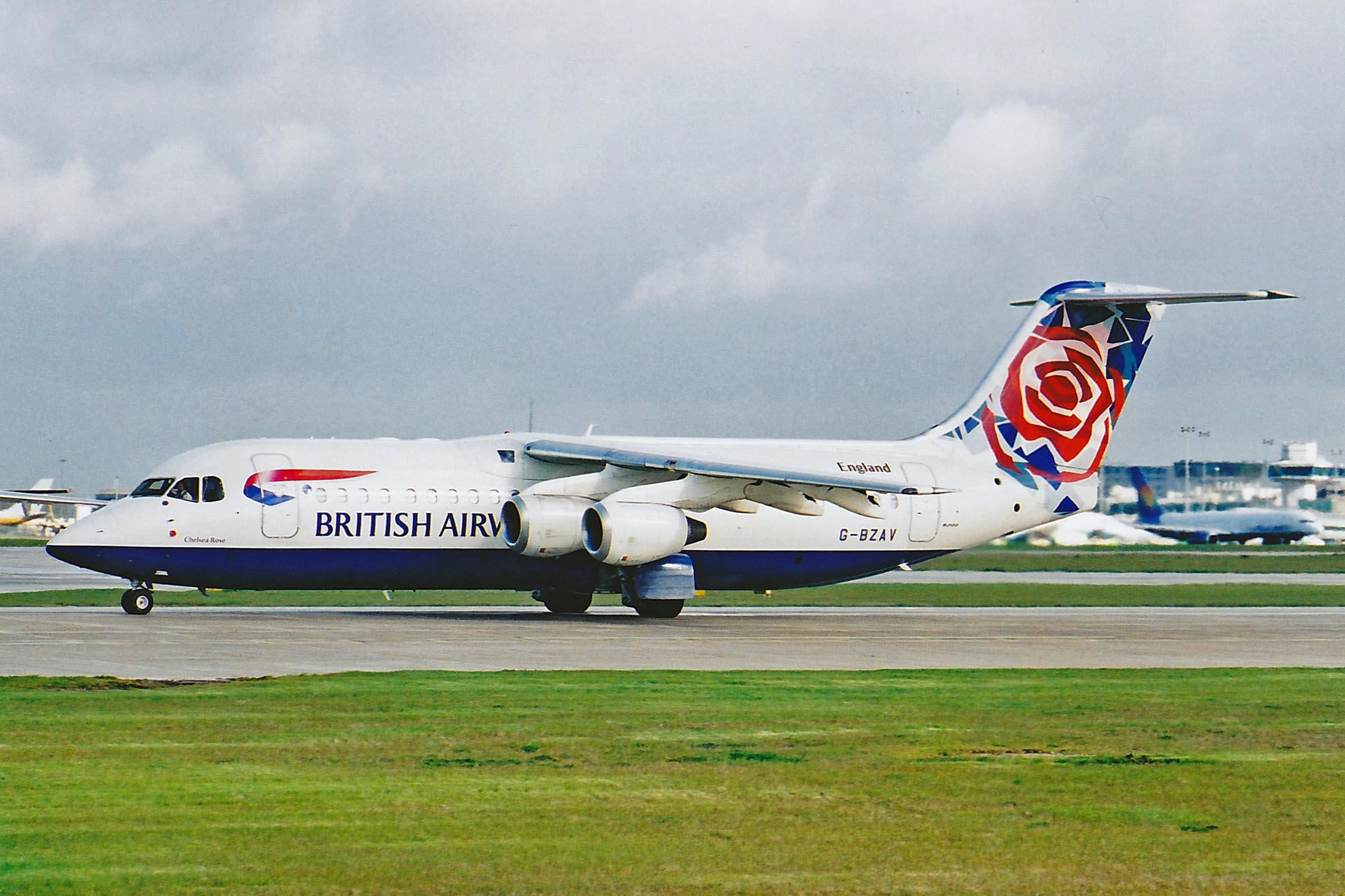
Avro RJ100

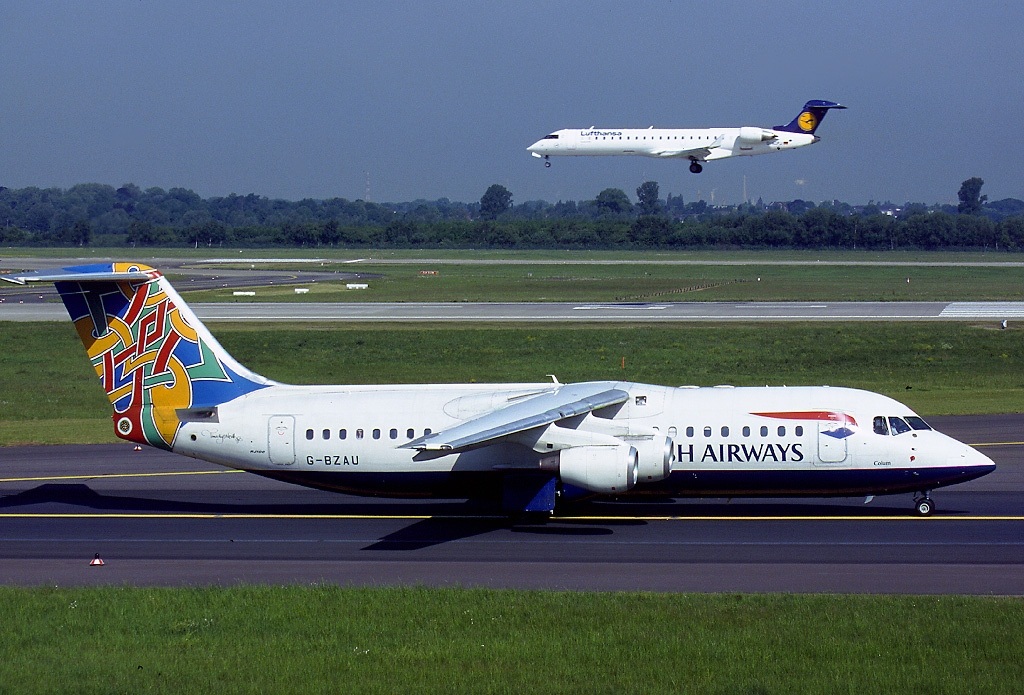
Avro RJ100

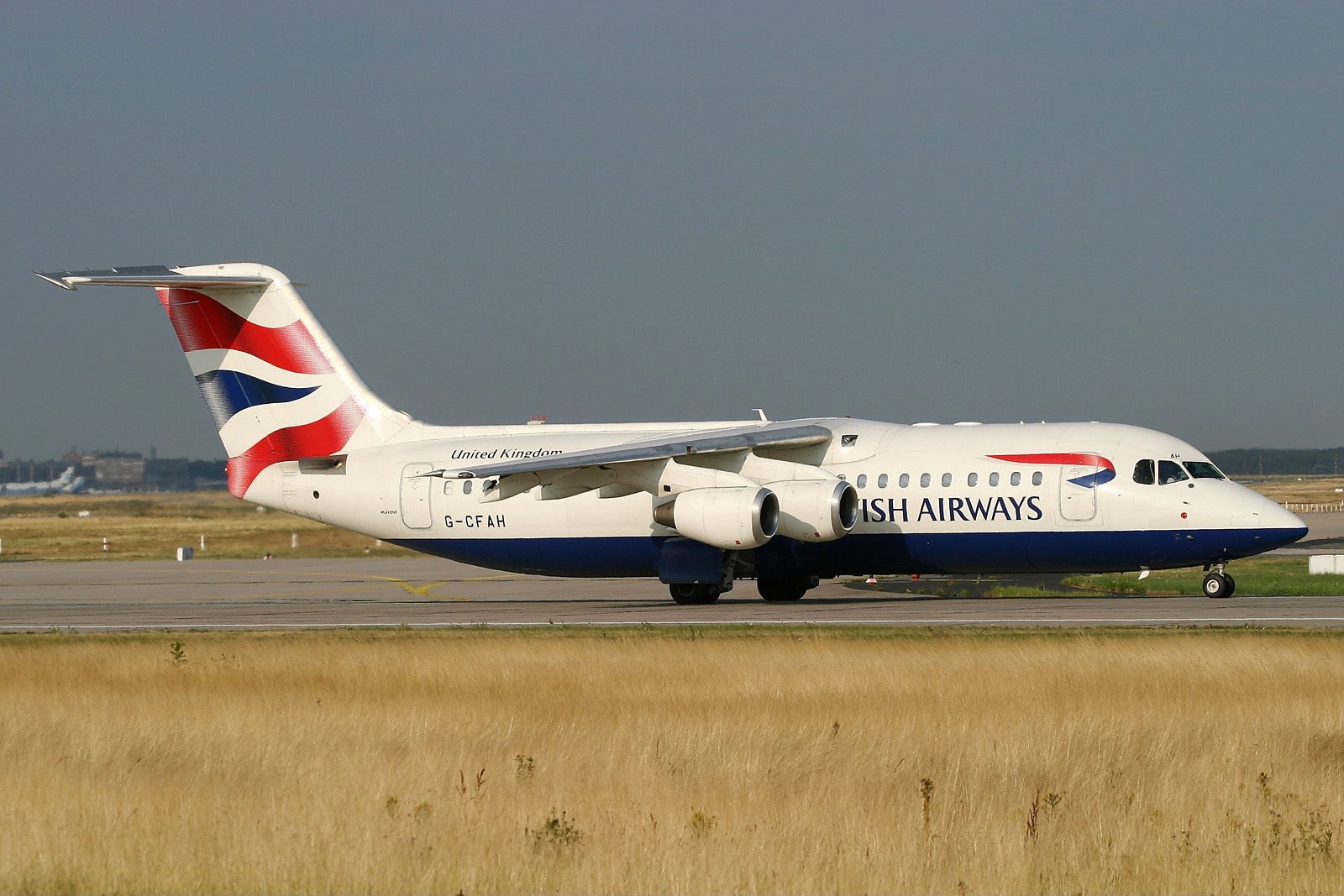
Avro RJ100

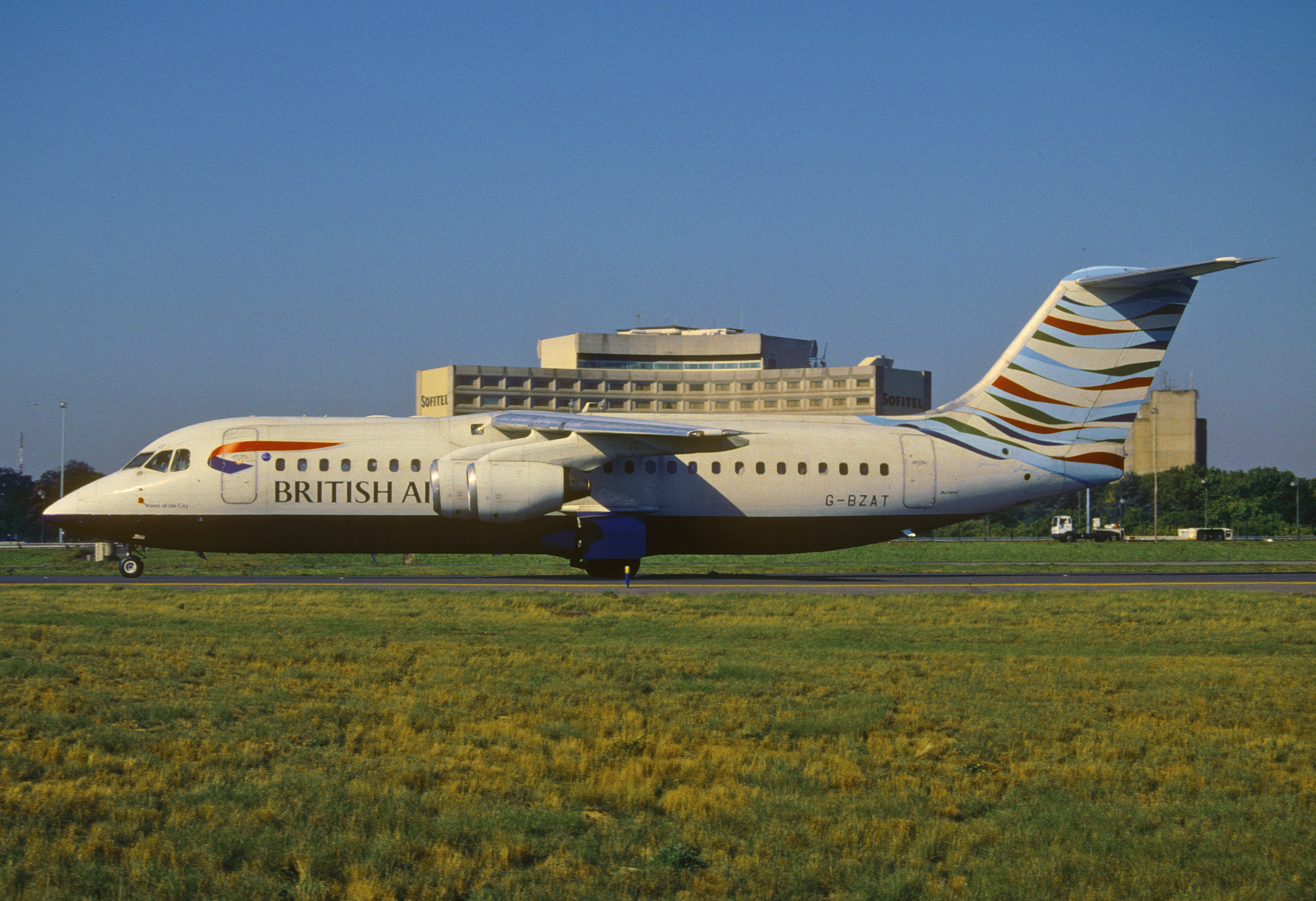
Avro RJ100

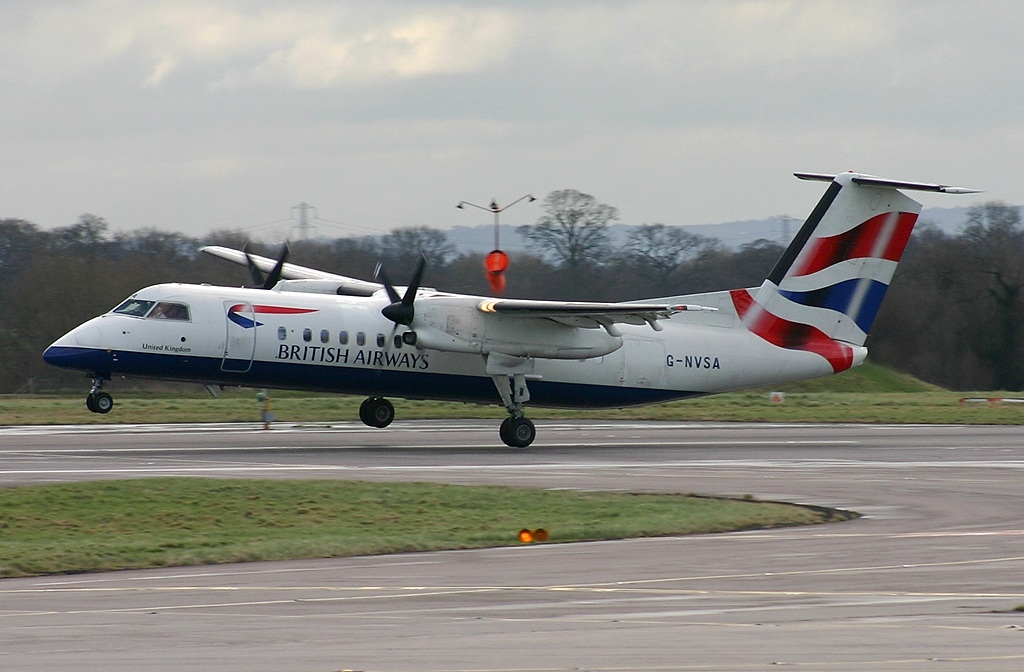
Bombardier Dash 8 Q300

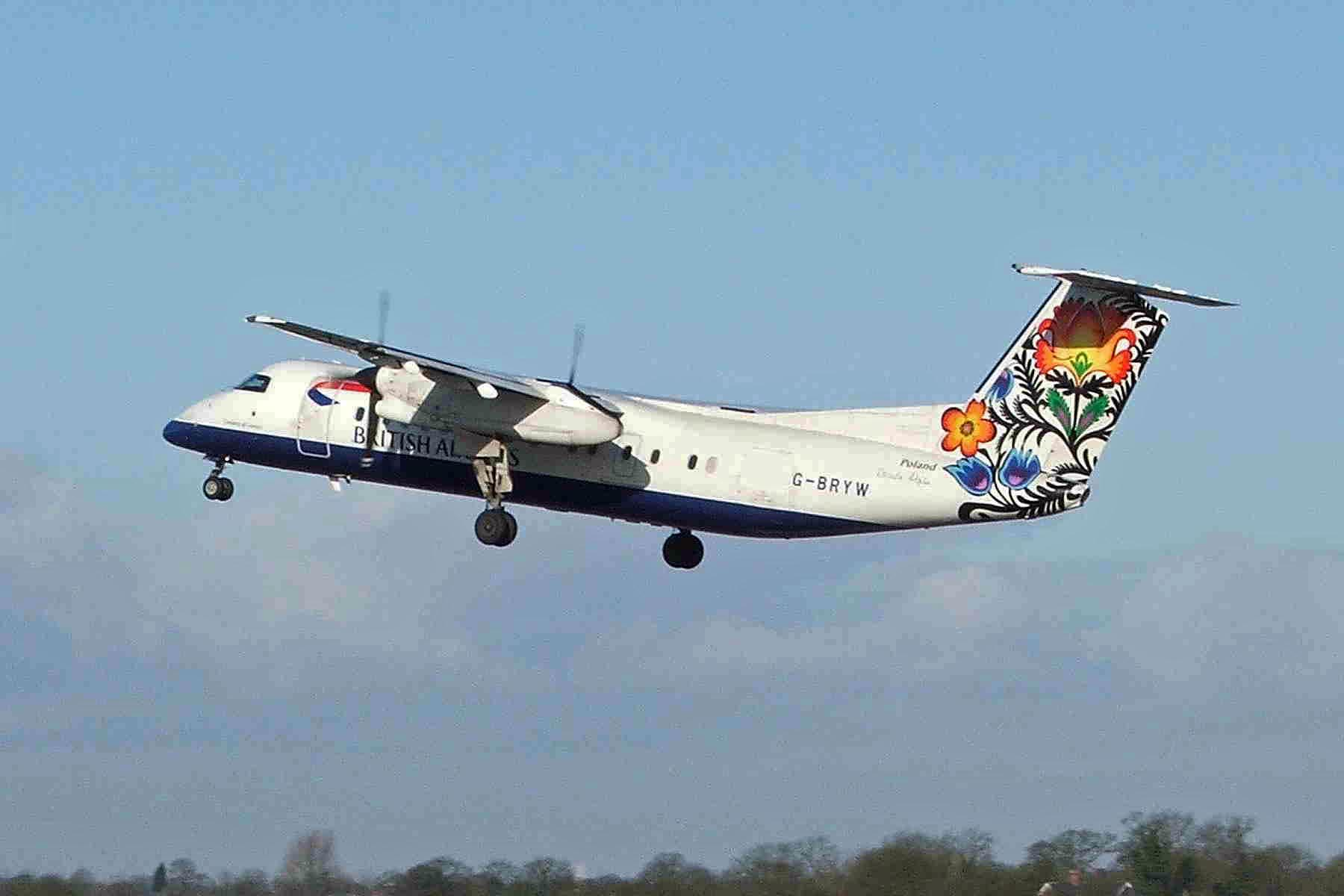
Bombardier Dash 8 Q300

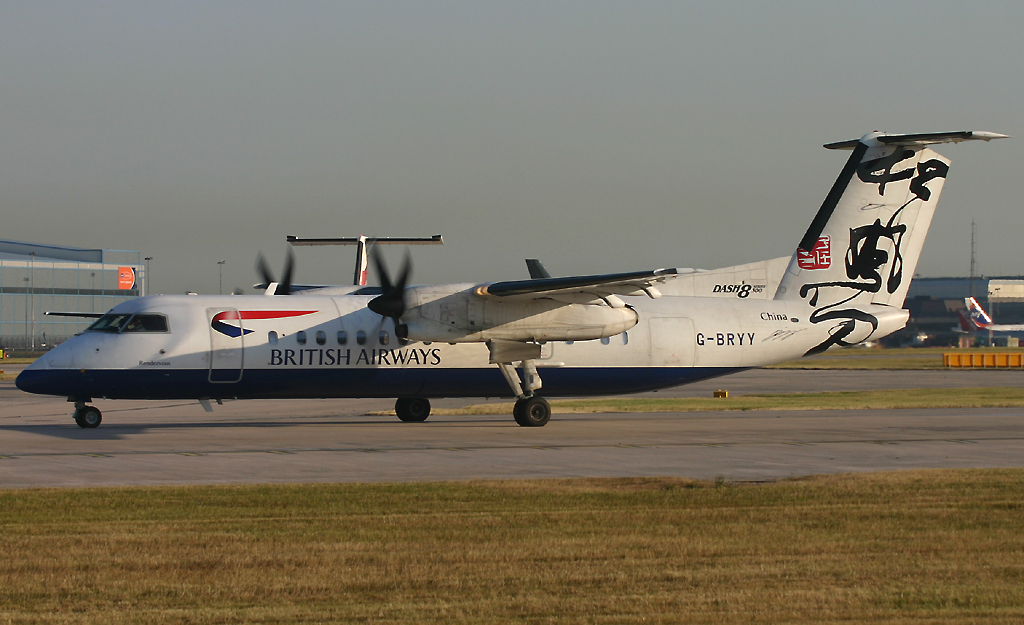
Bombardier Dash 8 Q300

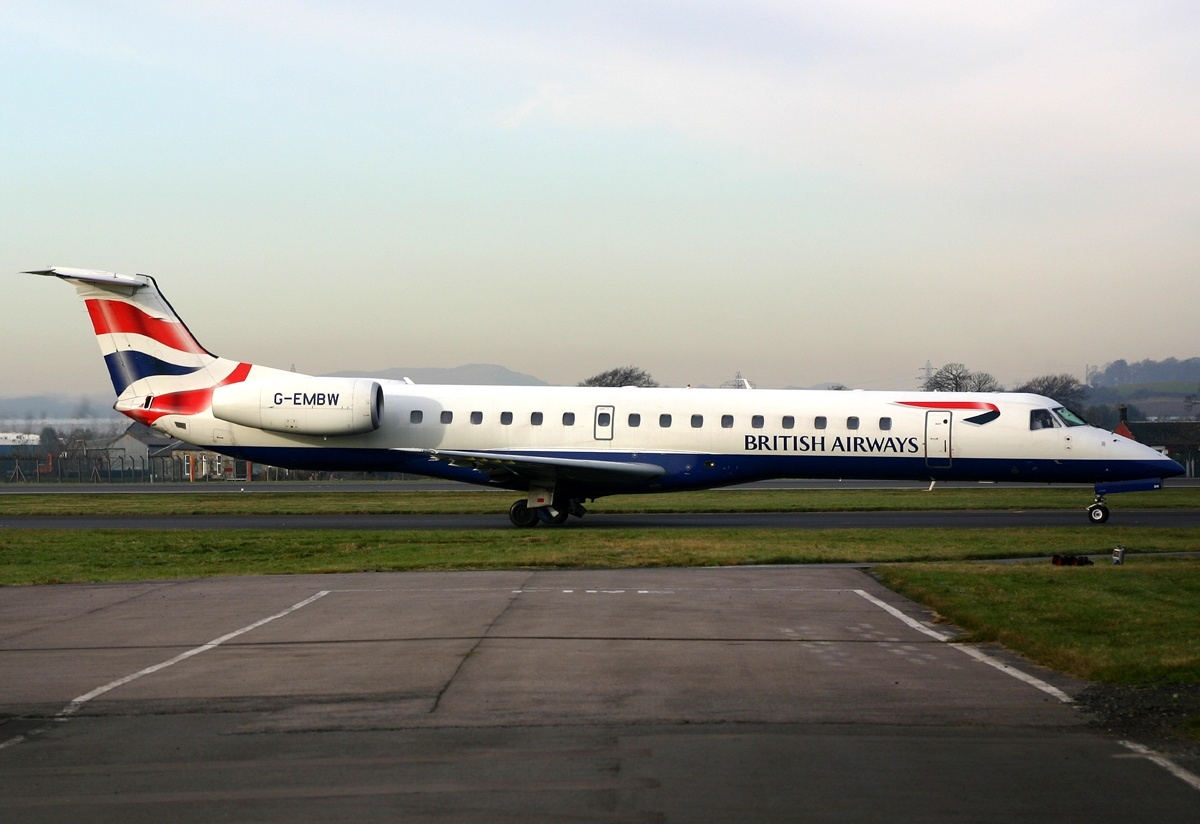
Embraer ERJ 145

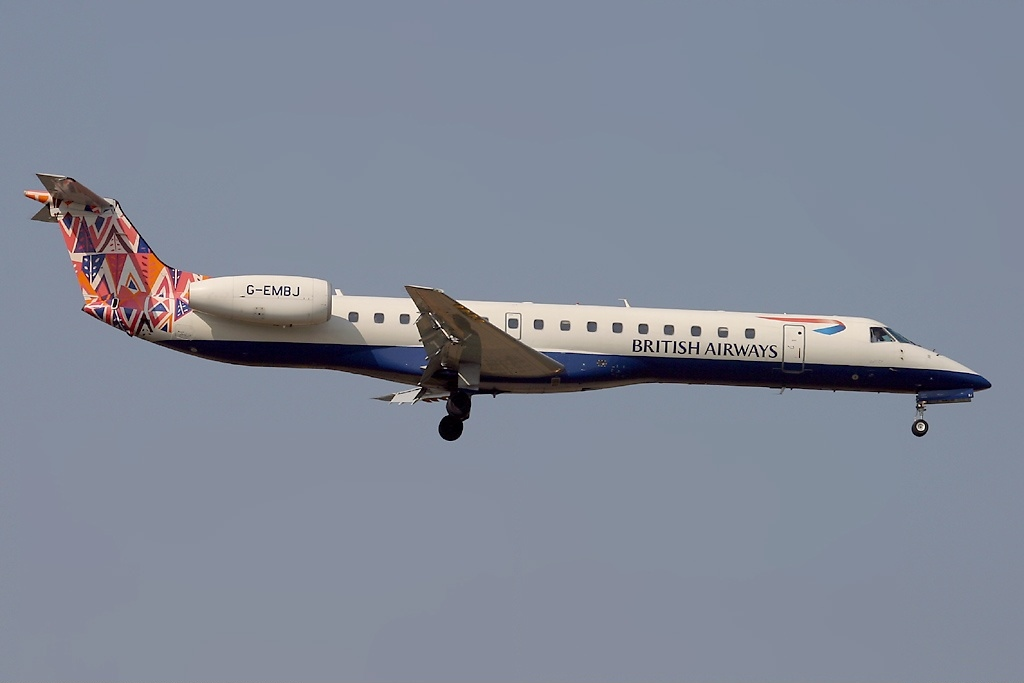
Embraer ERJ 145

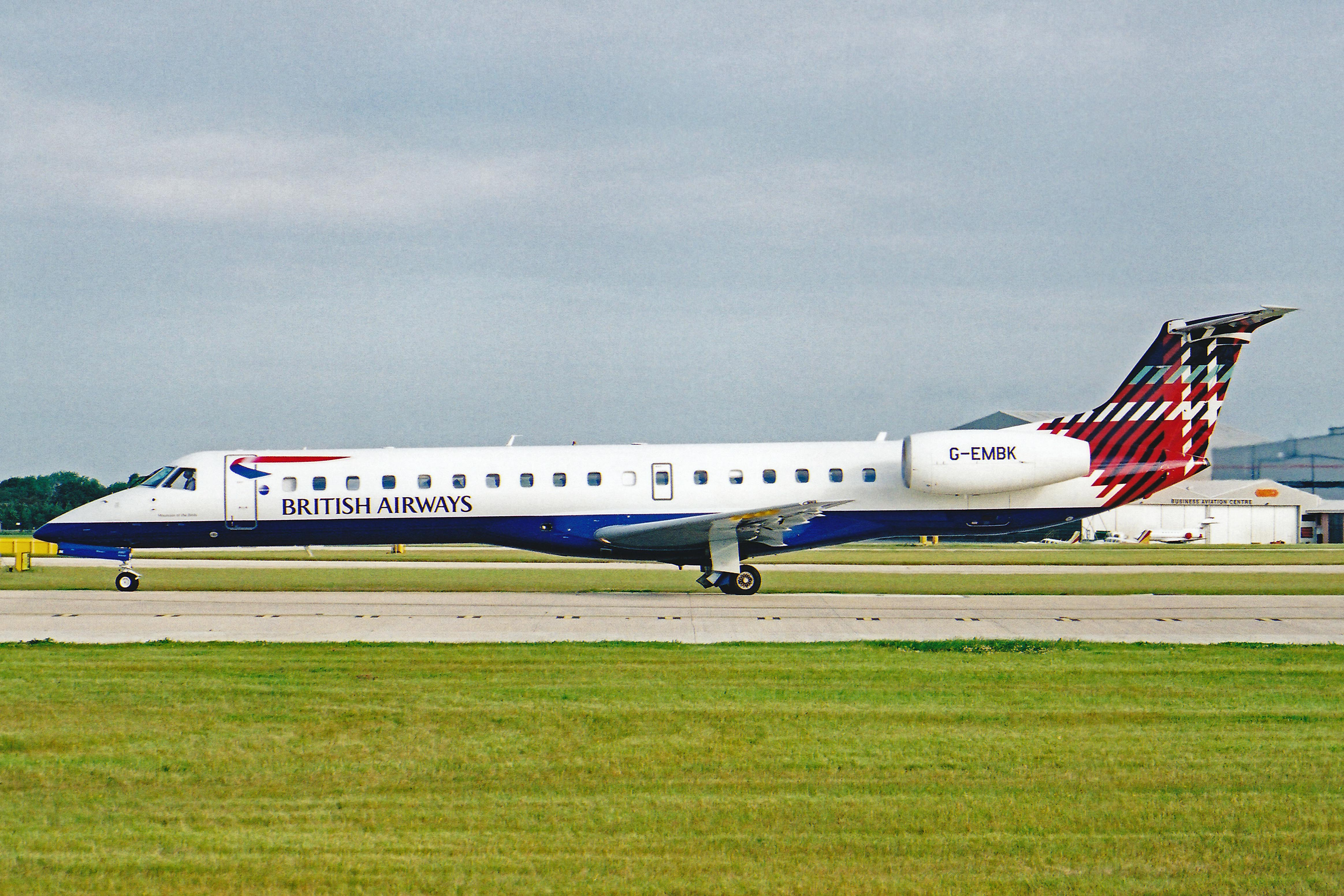
Embraer ERJ 145

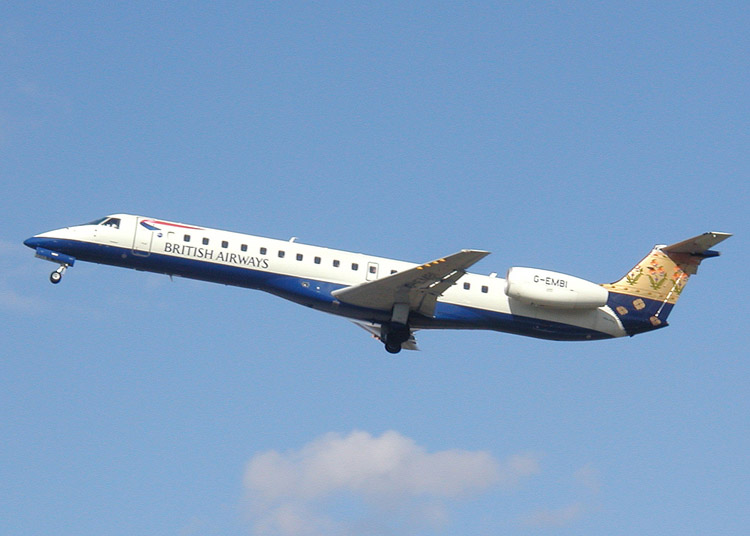
Embraer ERJ 145

== See also ==
- List of defunct airlines of the United Kingdom
