= British Regional Airlines =

UK regional airline, 1996–2002

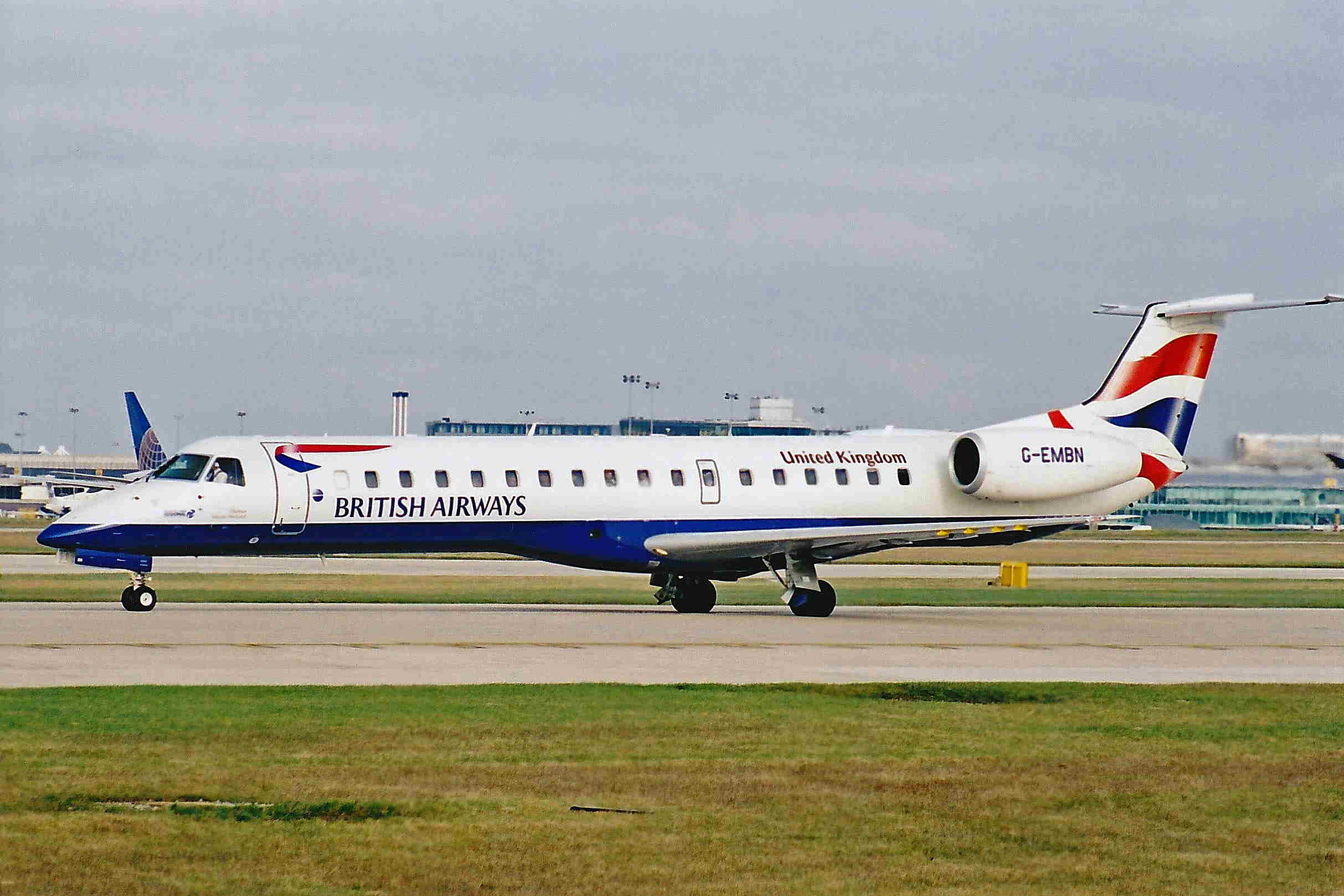
- ERJ-145
IATA	ICAO	Call sign
TH	BRT	BRITISH
- Founded: 1990 (as Manx Airlines (Europe))
- Ceased operations: 2002
- Operating bases: Manchester Airport; Belfast City Airport; Southampton Airport; Cardiff Airport; Inverness Airport; Edinburgh Airport; Glasgow Airport
- Fleet size: 56
- Parent company: BRAL Group
- Headquarters: Manchester Airport
- Key people: Michael Bishop (Chairman); Terry Liddiard (MD)

British Regional Airlines was a franchise partner of British Airways based in Manchester. It operated a large network of domestic and European services from many UK regional airports. British Regional Airlines held a United Kingdom Civil Aviation Authority Type A Operating Licence, It was permitted to carry passengers, cargo and mail on aircraft with 20 or more seats.

== History ==
British Regional Airlines can trace its history back to November 1990 when Manx Airlines (Europe) Ltd. was established on the initiative of Manx Airlines in order to expand and fly routes within the United Kingdom. Scheduled operations started in March of the following year. For a certain period of time it was also a subsidiary of British Midland Airways.

In January 1995 the air carrier became a franchise partner for British Airways, operating some routes from its Manchester base under the British Airways Express brand. In September 1996, Airlines of Britain Holdings which owned British Midland along with regional carriers Manx Airlines, Manx Airlines (Europe), and Loganair, announced it would split the regional airlines into a separate grouping. As a result, the three regional carriers were spun off as the British Regional Airlines Group. The UK based British Airways Express franchise operations of Manx Airlines (Europe) and Loganair were to be operated in a combined new airline British Regional Airlines Ltd. (BRAL), while Manx Airlines continued to operate services from the Isle of Man. Business Air was also absorbed into the group that year bringing a fleet of seven Saab 340 and one additional BAe 146 aircraft. At the same time, British Airways closed down its Highlands division and transferred the routes to British Regional Airlines which would operate them as a British Airways Express franchise partner.

In February 1997, BRAL announced an order for five Embraer ERJ-145 aircraft, the first of which was delivered in June that year. The aircraft replaced the BAe Jetstream 41 on services from Manchester and Southampton to Scotland. A total of 22 ERJ-145 aircraft were delivered to the airline between 1997 and 2002. In March, Loganair was subject to a management buyout led by Chairman Scott Grier. The independent Loganair continued as a British Airways Express franchise partner and operated services in the Northern Isles with a fleet of six aircraft (one de Havilland Canada DHC-6 Twin Otter and five Britten Norman Islanders). The main cross-border trunk routes remained with British Regional Airlines.

In 1998, the British Regional Airlines Group floated on the London Stock Exchange. In March of that year an expanded fleet of eleven Saab 340 aircraft which had operated on British Midland and former Business Air routes were used to launch a new British Midland Commuter sub-brand.

In March 2001 British Airways purchased the British Regional Airlines Group (holding company of British Regional Airlines and Manx Airlines). BRAL became a British airways subsidiary in the month of May and the regional airline was merged with Brymon Airways to create British Airways CitiExpress on 28 March 2002. Sister company Manx Airlines continued to operate as a stand-alone carrier until it too was merged in the following month of September.

== Fleet ==
At the time of the merger with Brymon Airways, British Regional Airlines and Manx Airlines operated a large fleet of regional aircraft including:

Aircraft	British Regional Airlines	Manx Airlines	Total
BAe 146-100	1		1
BAe 146-200	2	1	3
BAe 146-300	1		1
BAe Jetstream 41	11	1	12
BAe ATP	10	3	13
ATR 72-200	1		1
ERJ-145	19		19

== Gallery ==
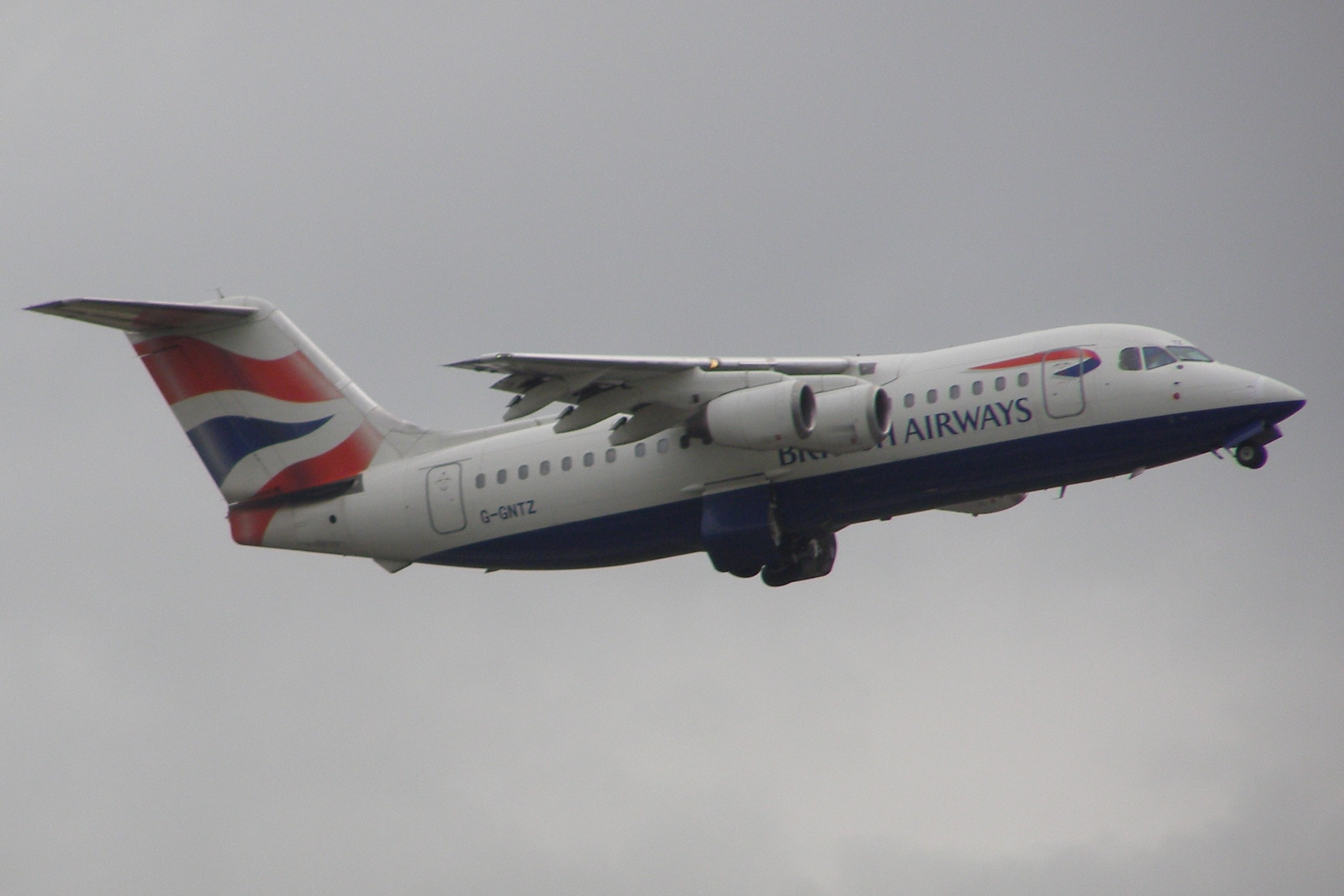
BAe 146-200

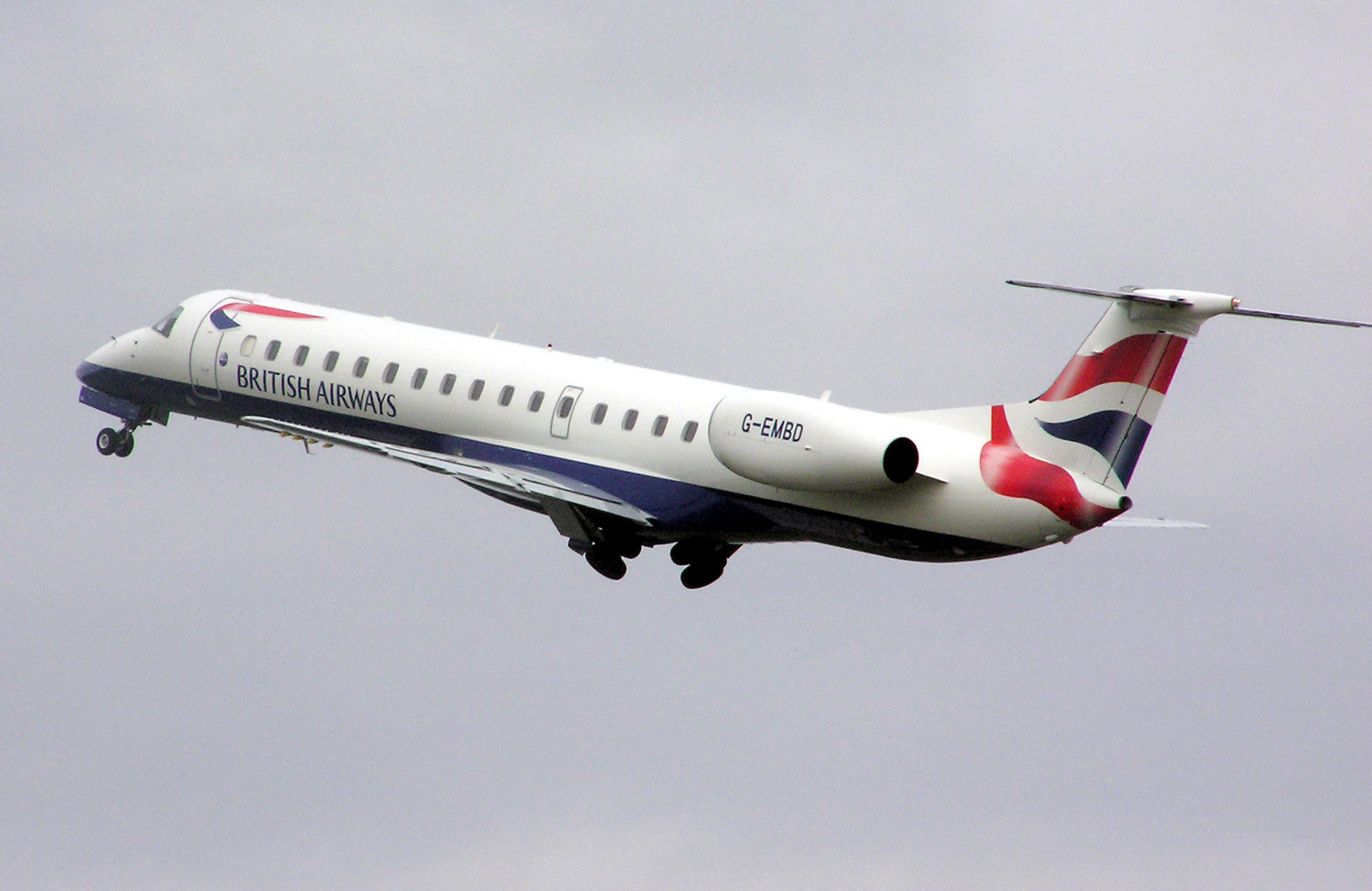
ERJ-145

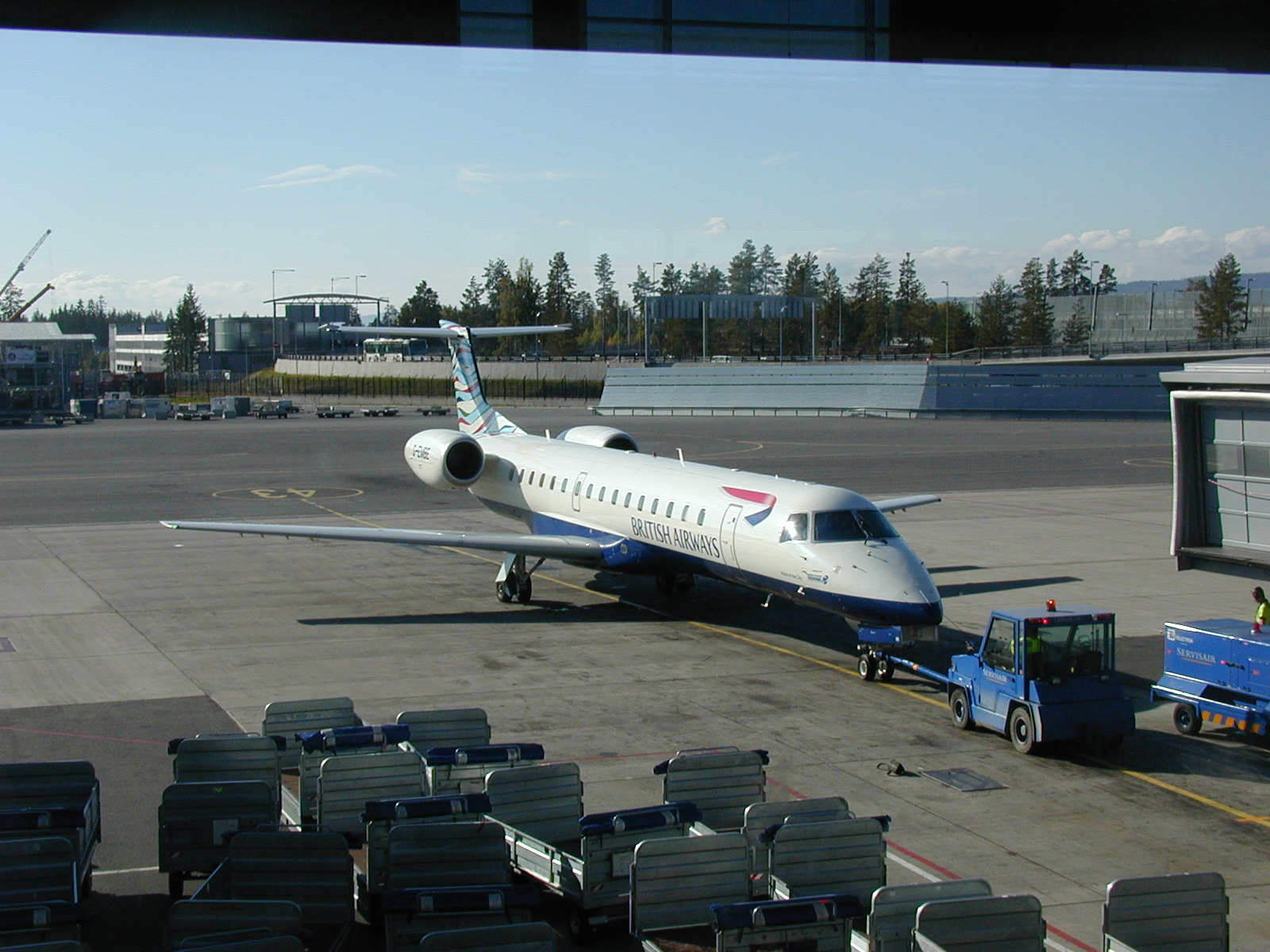
ERJ-145 at Oslo Airport

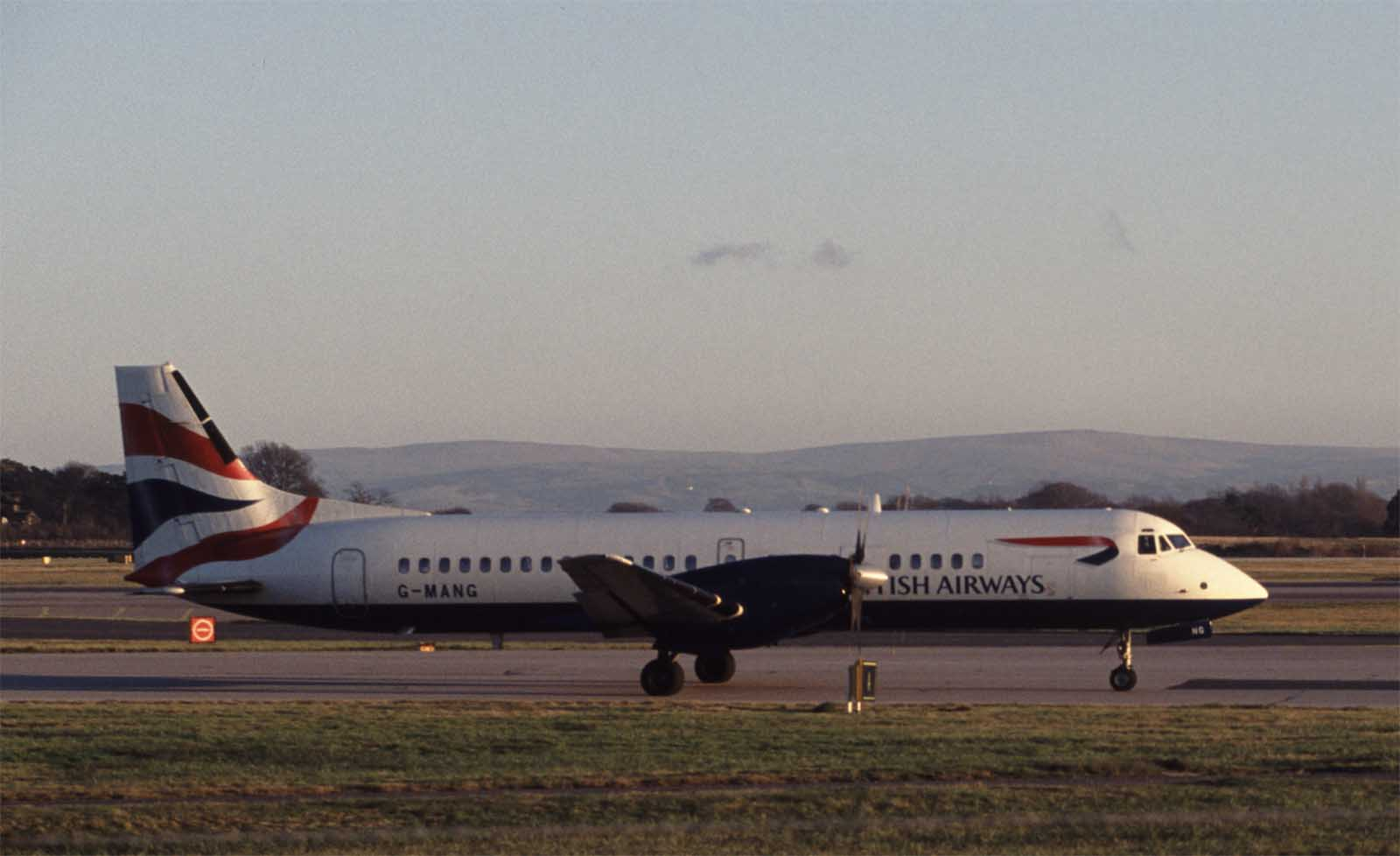
BAe ATP at Manchester Airport
