= Flybe =

Flybe may refer to:

- Flybe (1979–2020), a defunct regional British airline based in Exeter
- Flybe (2022–2023), a defunct regional British airline based in Birmingham
