= Woodgate Aviation =

| IATA | ICAO | Call sign |
|---|---|---|
| - | CWY | CAUSEWAY |
- Founded: 1969
- Hubs: Belfast International Airport; Isle of Man Airport
- Destinations: UK
- Headquarters: Belfast International Airport, United Kingdom
- Key people: John Keen (Managing Director)
- Website: http://www.woodair.com/

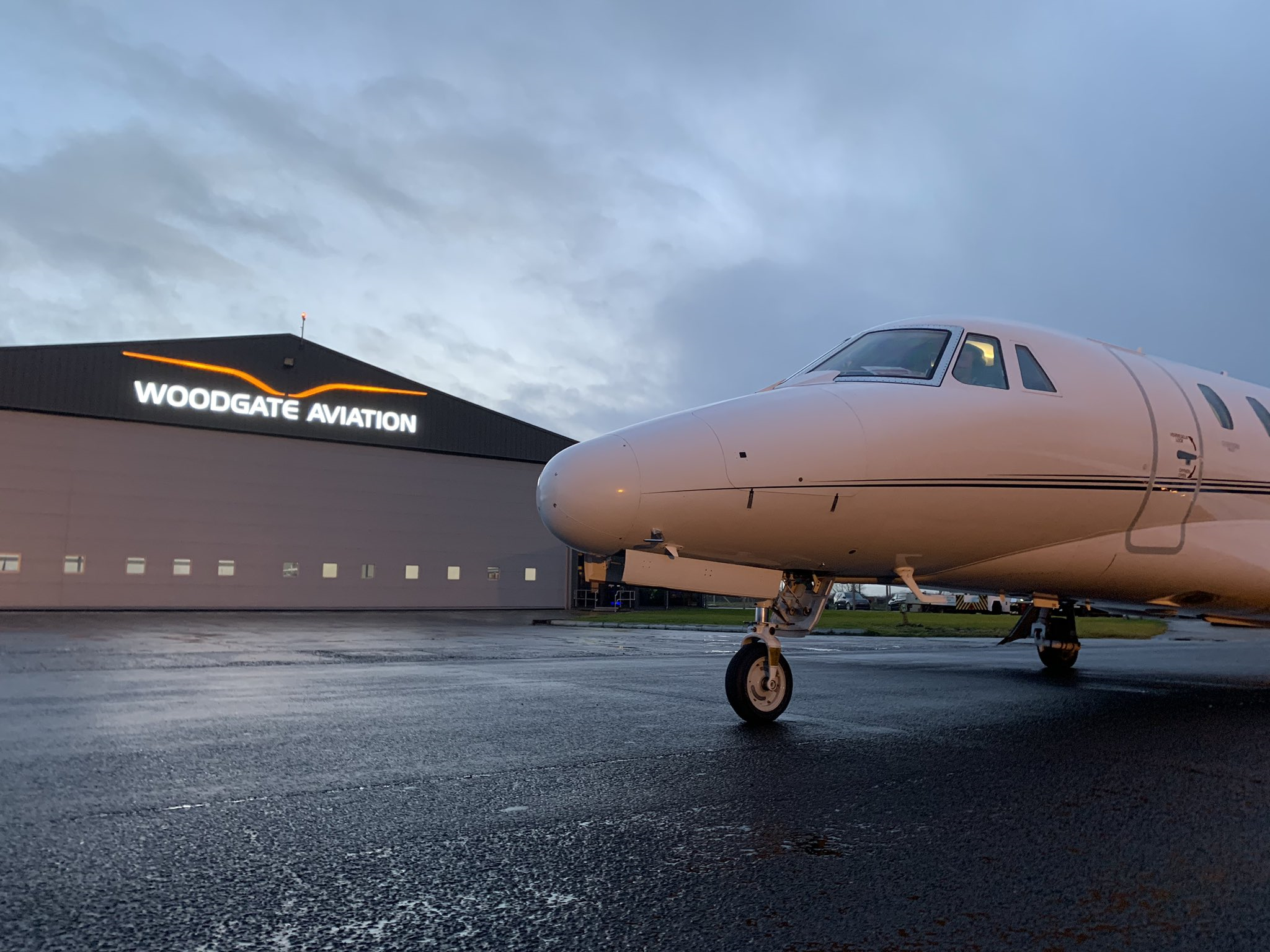
Woodgate Aviation Hangar at BFS

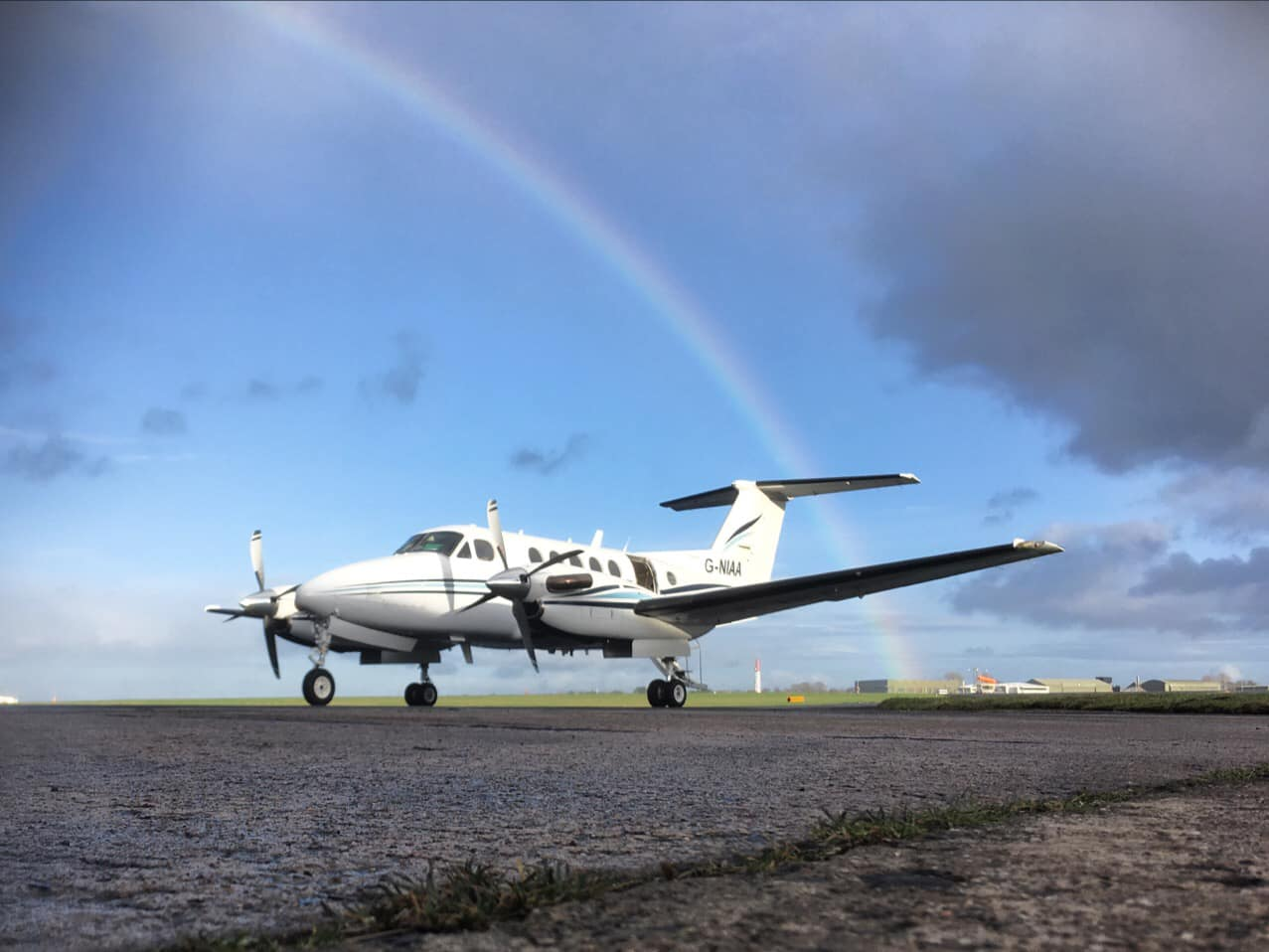
Woodgate Aviation Beechcraft King Air

Woodgate Aviation is a British aircraft charter and management company based in Belfast, Northern Ireland, which specialises in medical flights.

Woodgate Aviation operate from a purpose-built hangar at Belfast International Airport.

== Accidents and incidents ==
- On August 6th, 2025, Woodgate Aviation Flight 2, a Beechcraft Super King Air 200 on route to Belfast International Airport, makes a gear up landing at Birmingham Airport, of the pilot, he leaves with minor injuries.
