= Buzz (British airline) =

Low-cost airline of the United Kingdom (1999–2004)

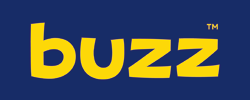

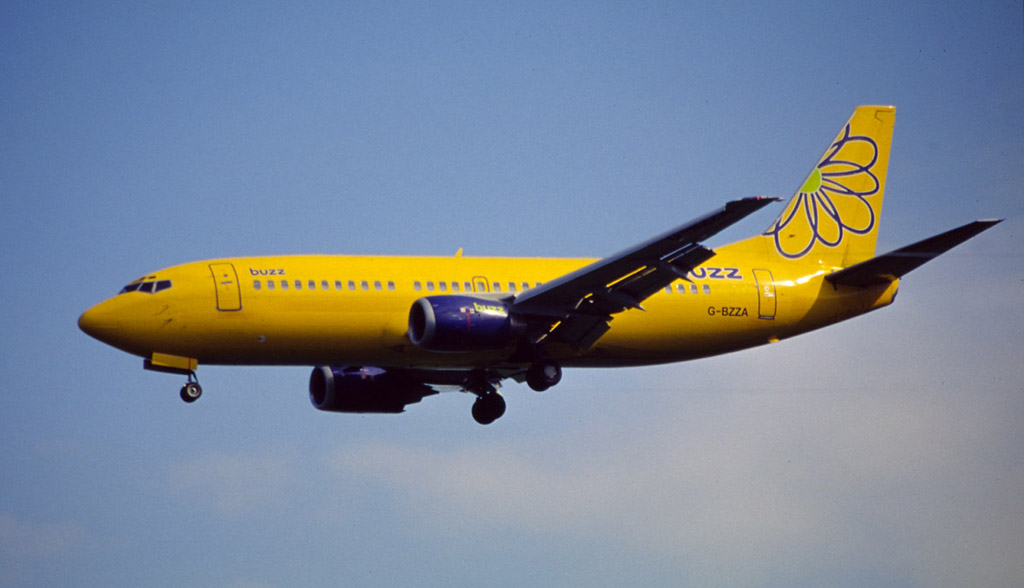
- Boeing 737-300
IATA	ICAO	Call sign
UK	BUZ	BUZZ
- Founded: 1999
- Commenced operations: 4 January 2000
- Ceased operations: 31 October 2004
- Hubs: London Stansted
- Parent company: Ryanair
- Headquarters: Stansted Airport, England
- Website: www.buzzaway.com

Buzz (styled as buzz) was a British low-cost airline operating services within Europe. Founded in 1999 as a subsidiary of KLM, it began operations on 4 January 2000. After being acquired by Ryanair in April 2003, it ceased operations in October 2004. In 2019, Ryanair revived the Buzz name by rebranding its Polish subsidiary Ryanair Sun.

== History ==
Buzz was launched by KLM as a sub-brand of KLM uk to compete with other low-cost carriers such as EasyJet, Go Fly and Ryanair by taking over many of the point-to-point routes of the former AirUK/KLM uk network. It started with eight British Aerospace (BAe) 146-300 aircraft transferred from the KLM uk brand which retained the Amsterdam feeder routes (transferred to KLM Cityhopper in November 2002). This was shortly followed by two leased ex-Deutsche BA Boeing Boeing 737-300 aircraft. In late 2002, buzz leased from International Lease Finance Corporation another six 737-300s previously operated by Continental Airlines and the first two 737s were returned to lessor Shananda in early 2003. Buzz also was the first low-cost airline trying to attract the high yield business travel segment, especially by promoting its flights to/from London Stansted to Frankfurt (international airport) and Düsseldorf. Buzz had a local commercial manager in Germany (2000–2003) who established the first direct contacts to corporates, TMs (Travel Managers) and TMCs (Travel Management Companies).

On 31 January 2003 KLM announced its intention to sell Buzz to Ryanair. The sale was completed on 10 April 2003 following approval from the Office of Fair Trading. In addition to acquiring Buzz slots at London Stansted, Ryanair acquired the leases of all six of the Boeing 737s and sub-leased four of the BAe 146s from KLM.

Ryanair relaunched the airline as Buzz Stansted, retaining the 10 aircraft on the UK register. Several of the original Buzz operations staff were transferred to the new organisation and an application was made for a new Air Operators Certificate (AOC). After route proving flights on 25 April 2003 an AOC was issued by the British Civil Aviation Authority on 28 April 2003 with the first revenue sectors being operated the same day.

The aircraft fleet, the majority of which retained the Buzz livery, flew several of the original Buzz routes and some Ryanair routes that had been operated by Boeing 737-200s under the Ryanair call sign. However, the BAe 146 aircraft were returned to KLM in January 2004 and the 737s continued operating the remaining routes that were not dropped following the withdrawal of the 146s.

In September 2004, Ryanair decided to close Buzz Stansted and flying operations ceased on 31 October 2004. The 737 aircraft were returned to International Lease Finance Corporation and the Ryanair 737-800s took over from the Buzz aircraft. Ryanair also discontinued some of the original Buzz routes and redirected others to other airports as they were considered nearby to where existing Ryanair services operated.

=== 2019 revival ===
On 15 March 2019, Ryanair announced that they would revive the Buzz brand as the new name for Poland based Ryanair Sun.

== Fleet ==
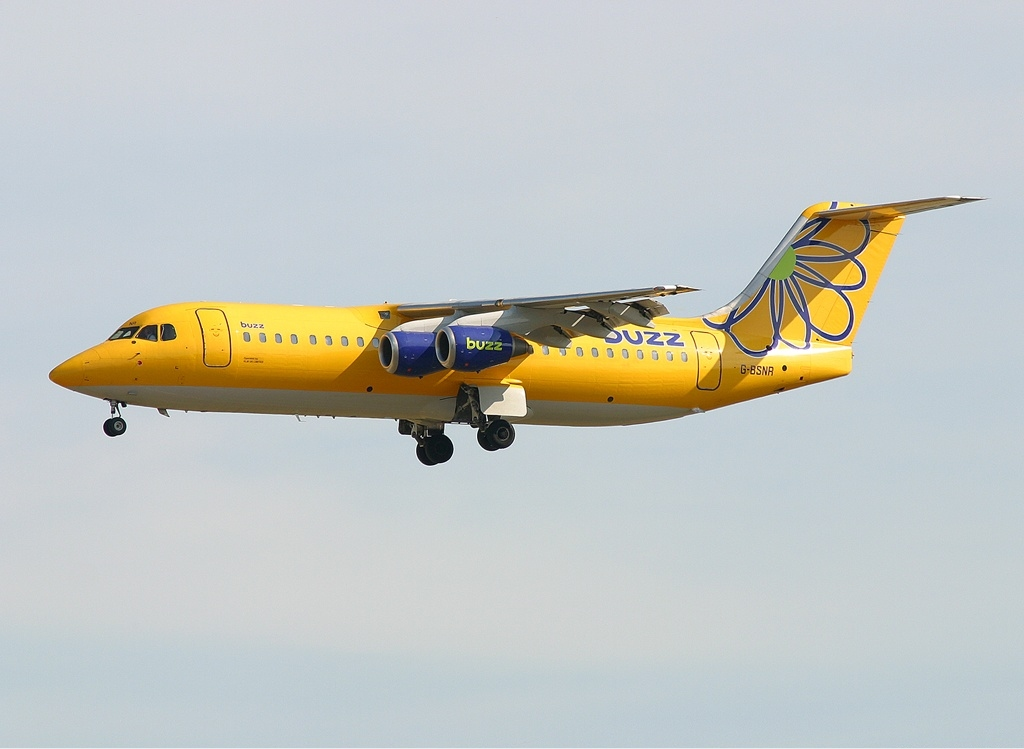
Buzz BAe 146-300

Before ceasing operations, the Buzz fleet consisted of the following aircraft:

Aircraft	Total
Boeing 737-300	8
BAe 146-300	10
Total	18
