= Air UK Leisure =

Airline of the United Kingdom (1987–1999)

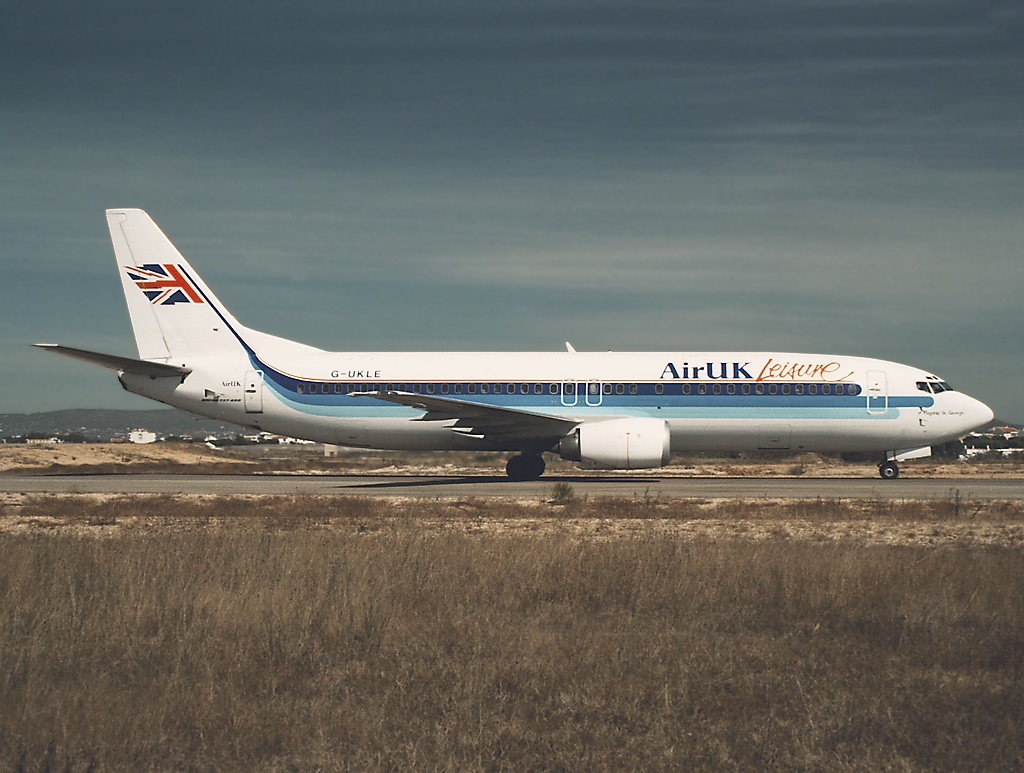
- Boeing 737-400
IATA	ICAO	Call sign
MV	UKL	LEISURE
- Founded: June 1987
- Commenced operations: October 1988
- Ceased operations: 1996 (operations merged into Leisure International Airways)
- Hubs: London Stansted Airport
- Parent company: AirUK

Air UK Leisure was a British airline operating charter flights on behalf of its parent Air UK.

== History ==
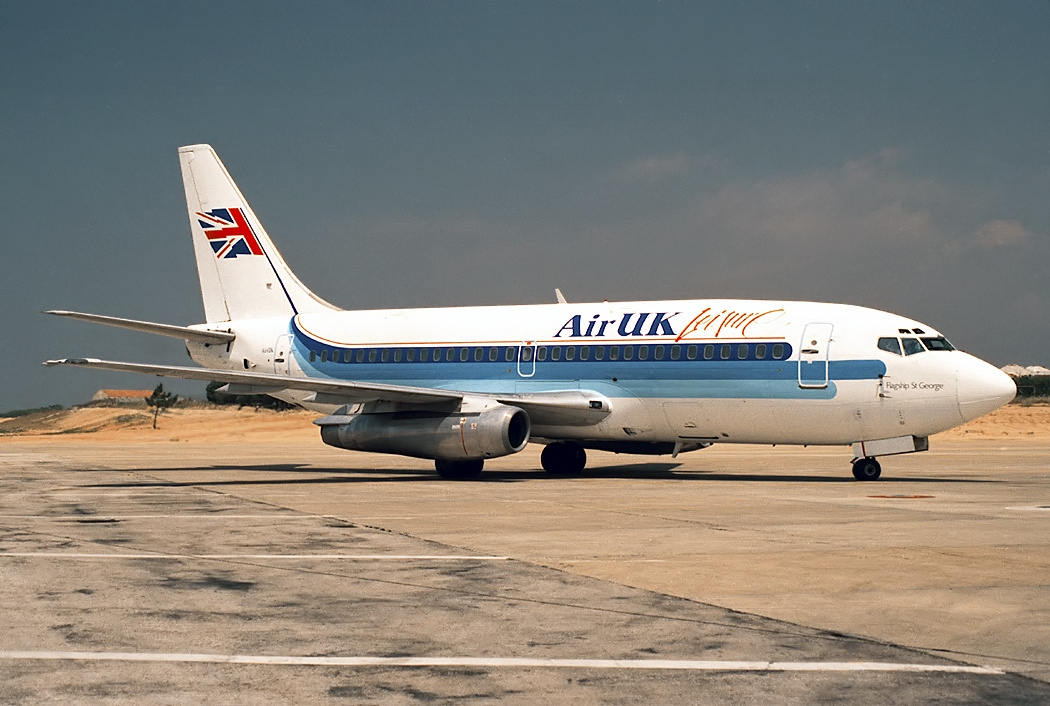
A Boeing 737-200 of Air UK Leisure at Faro Airport in 1989.

In June 1987 Air UK announced that it would start a new charter airline based at London Stansted Airport which would start operating before 1988 high season with two leased Boeing 737-200 aircraft. The company Air UK (Leisure) Ltd.June was formed in June 1987 with Air UK providing 30% of the £2.5 million capital, B&C Holding (the parent company of Air UK) 30% with the rest from the travel group Viking International.

The airline started operations in 1988 with two leased Boeing 737-200 aircraft and placed orders for four new Boeing 737-400s from a leasing company for delivery in October 1988. The first flight was from London Stansted Airport to Faro Airport in Portugal. The airline became the first operator of the Boeing 737-400 in Europe when the first aircraft was delivered on 14 October 1988.

The airline went on to operate seven Boeing 737-400s on both charter and scheduled services and to base aircraft at Manchester and Gatwick Airport as well as Stansted.

In 1993 the airline introduced two leased Boeing 767-300 aircraft on behalf of British holiday tour operator Unijet.

=== Leisure International Airways ===
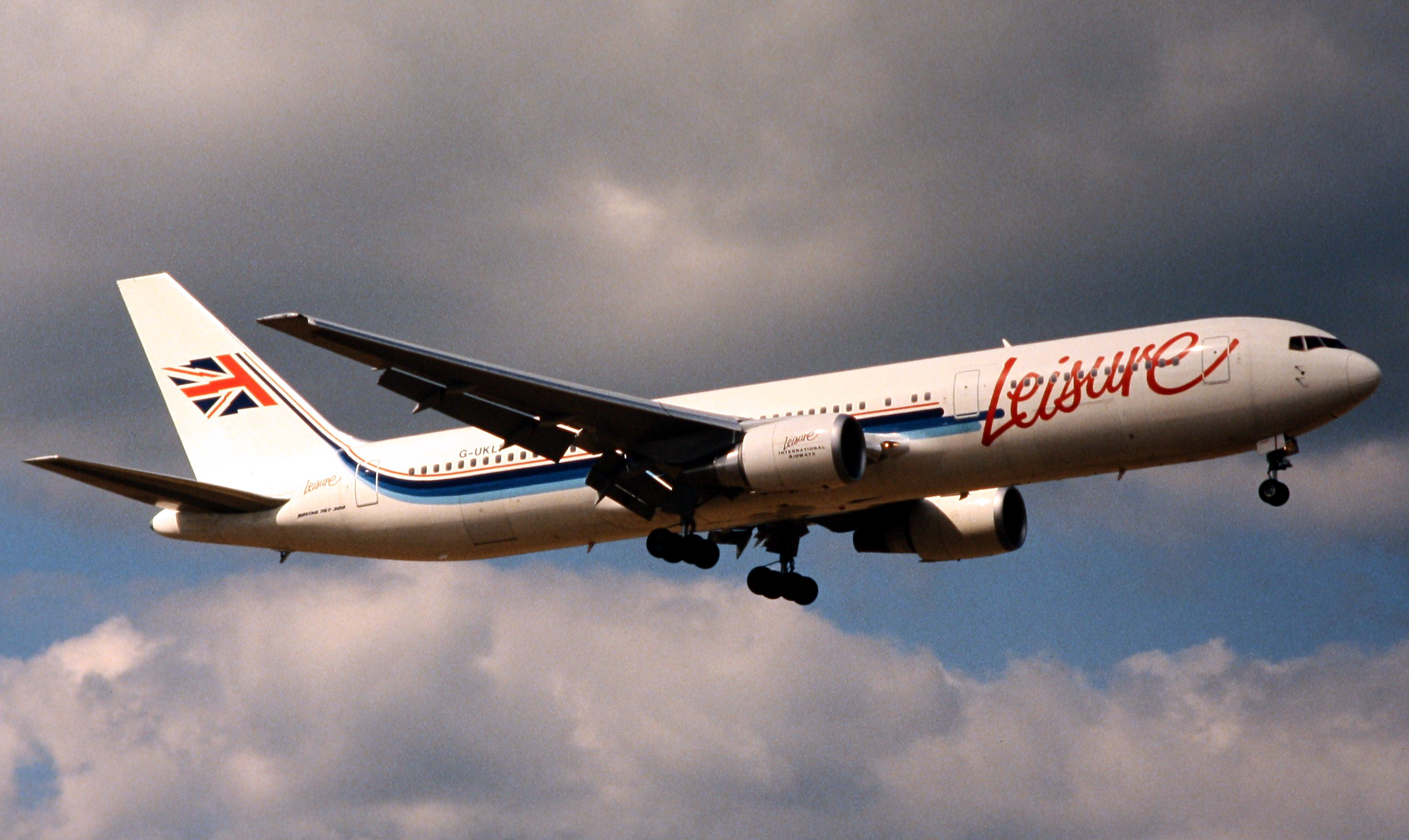
A Boeing 767-300 of Leisure International Airways upon take-off in 1999.

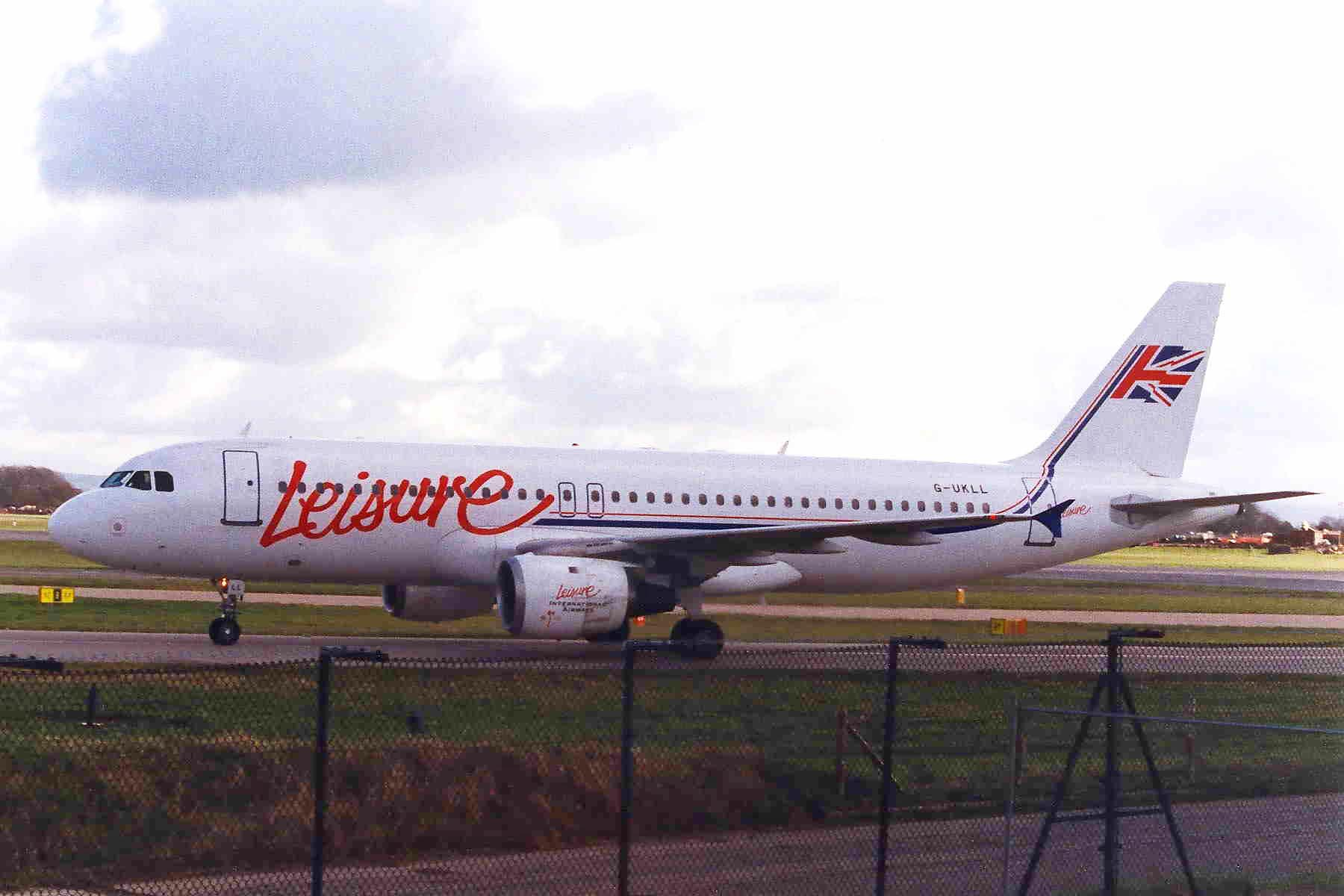
An Airbus A320 of Leisure International Airways

In 1996 the airline was sold to the tour operator Unijet, merged into its already established subsidiary Leisure International Airways and moved its main base to London Gatwick Airport.

On 29 March 1996 the airline introduced the first of three Airbus A320s into service to replace the Boeing 737-400s.

In 1998 First Choice acquired the airline after it took over Unijet, and Leisure International fleet and operations were merged into the First Choice airline Air 2000 at the end of that same year.

== Fleet ==
Over the years, Air UK Leisure operated the following aircraft types:

Aircraft	Introduced	Retired
Boeing 737-200	1988	1989
Boeing 737-400	1988	1997
Boeing 767-300	1993	1997

== See also ==
- List of defunct airlines of the United Kingdom
