= Air Anglia =

Airline of the United Kingdom (1970–1980)

Air Anglia Limited
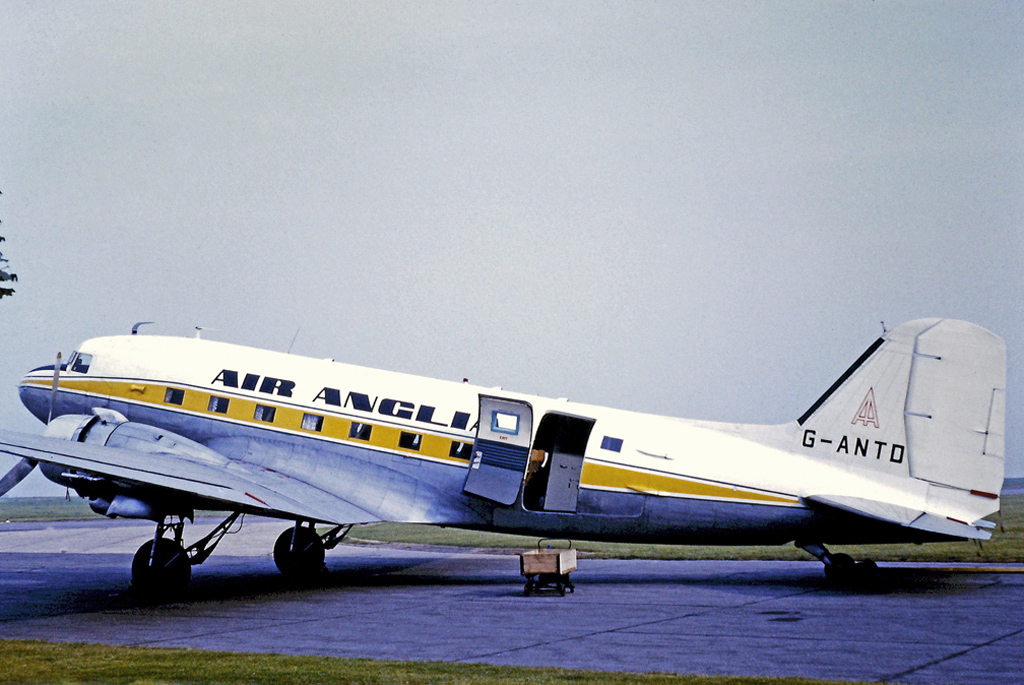
- Douglas DC-3
IATA	ICAO	Call sign
AQ	—	ANGLIA
- Founded: 1 July 1970
- Ceased operations: 16 January 1980 (merged with British Island Airways to form AirUK)
- Operating bases: Norwich Airport
- Headquarters: Norwich Airport, England

Air Anglia Limited was a wholly privately owned, independent (Note: Independent from government-owned corporations) British regional airline formed at Norwich Airport in 1970. Created as a result of a merger of three smaller operators, the new entity became an important regional scheduled carrier during the 1970s, serving the Eastern half of Britain. In 1980 Air Anglia merged with three regional rivals to form Air UK.

== History ==
=== The beginning ===
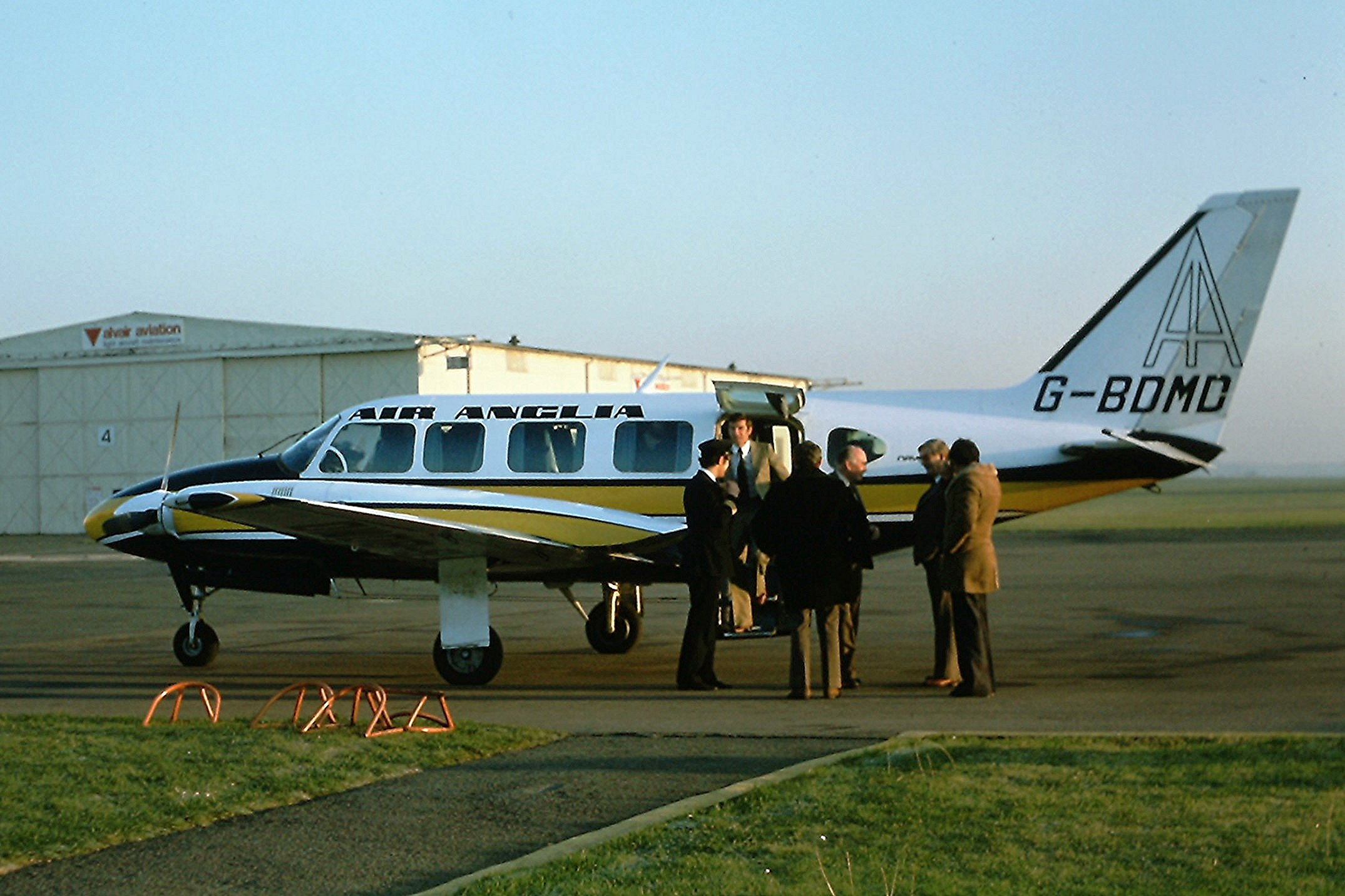
Piper PA-31 Navajo Chieftain

Air Anglia was the result of a three-way merger on July 22, 1970 between Anglian Air Charter, Norfolk Airways and Rig Air, three local air taxi operators based in the East of England. The new airline established its corporate headquarters as well as its main operating and engineering base at the recently opened airport at Norwich in East Anglia. At the time of formation Norwich Union became the controlling shareholder. Air Anglia established itself as an important regional scheduled operator, as well as one of the main fixed wing operators supporting the British oil and gas industry in the North Sea during the 1970s.

Air Anglia commenced operations in August 1970 with a small fleet of Douglas DC-3 piston-engined airliners (see image in the box) as well as a number of smaller, "executive" aircraft types inherited from its predecessors. With these aircraft it mainly operated oil and gas industry support flights from Norwich and Aberdeen as well as from Humberside Airport with an almost regular frequency from the following December. In June 1971 it started internal services from Norwich to Liverpool, Newcastle, Manchester, Edinburgh and Aberdeen; and an international service to Dublin.

=== Turboprops and scheduled flights ===
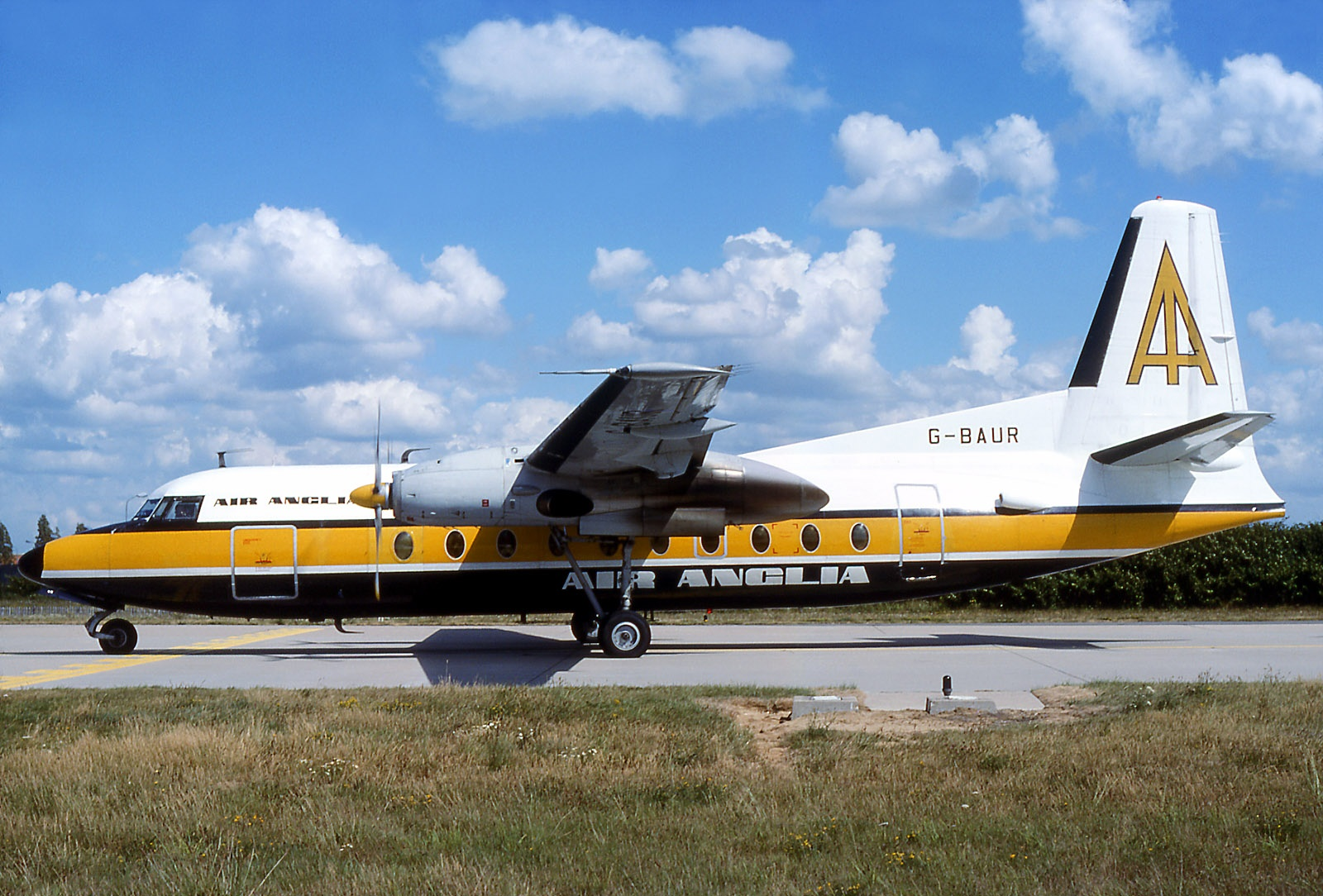
Fokker F-27-200 Friendship in 1978

In May 1972 Air Anglia added the first Fokker F-27 Friendship turboprops to its fleet and a second one in 1973. The introduction of these aircraft into the airline's fleet coincided with the launch of the company's first year-round scheduled services from its Norwich base to Aberdeen via Humberside and Teesside as well as from Norwich to Amsterdam. The scheduled services between Norwich, Humberside, Teesside and Aberdeen allowed Air Anglia to commercially exploit the regular positioning flights it had been operating between these points since its inception. Oil and gas industry related business travellers constituted a high proportion of this traffic.

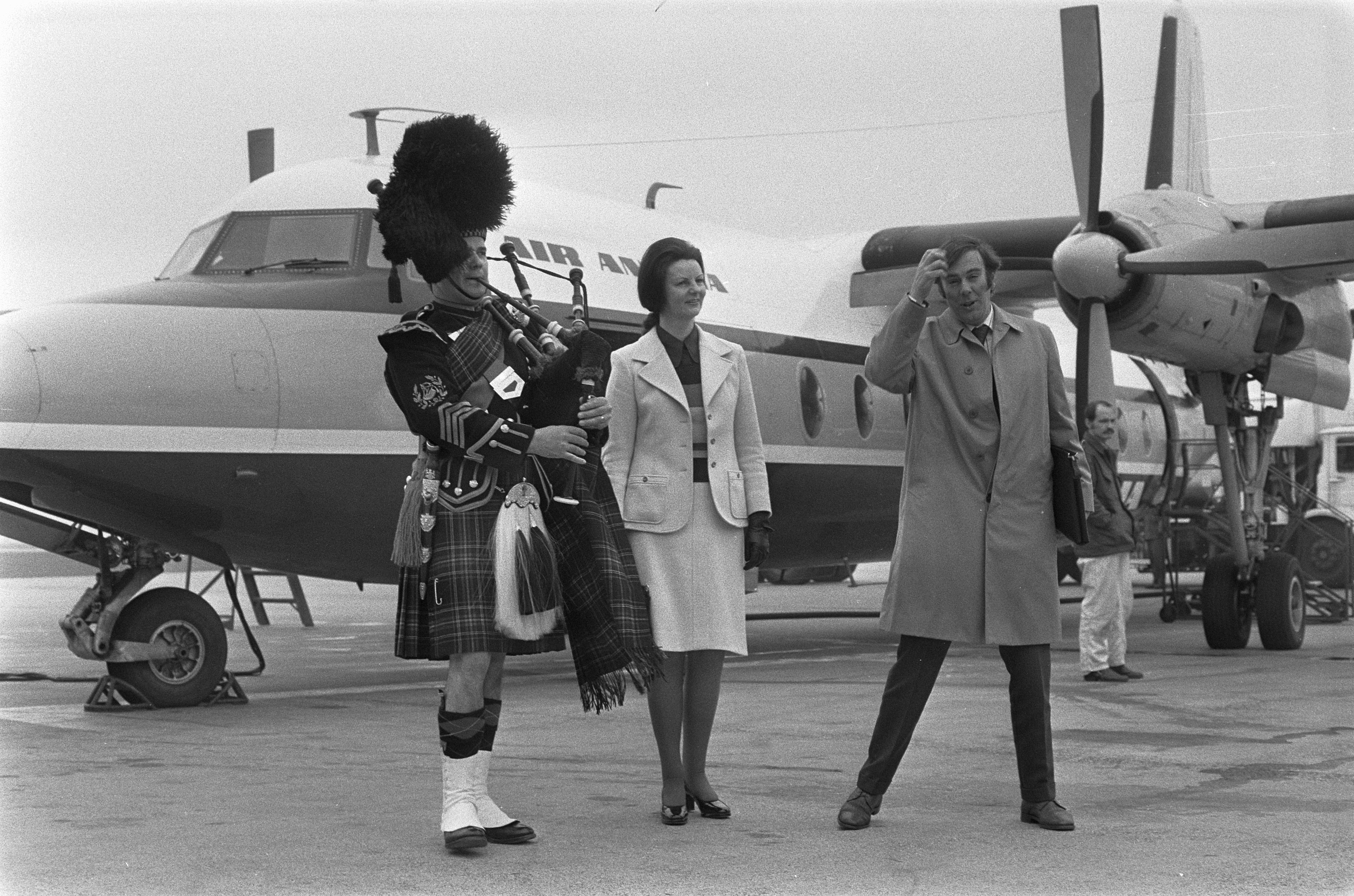
Inauguration of Aberdeen-Amsterdam route

The launch of Air Anglia's first international scheduled service to Amsterdam in 1975 also led to the conclusion of a joint marketing agreement with Dutch flag carrier KLM, at the time the biggest operator and dominant scheduled airline at Amsterdam's Schiphol Airport. Under this agreement KLM agreed to host Air Anglia's new Norwich—Amsterdam scheduled service, as well as any subsequently launched scheduled services linking regional UK airports not served by the KLM group with Amsterdam Schiphol, in its reservations computer. This gave travel agents worldwide instant access to Air Anglia's connecting flights to/from Amsterdam via KLM's Global Distribution System, thereby enabling Air Anglia to improve its passenger loads on these services as well as helping KLM to boost its long-haul loads by delivering it additional transfer traffic from the UK regions to its Schiphol base. In addition to these year-round scheduled services, Air Anglia also operated seasonal, summer only scheduled services from Norwich, Humberside and Aberdeen to Jersey. Air Anglia's seasonal Aberdeen—Jersey scheduled service was the longest non-stop scheduled operation using a turboprop aircraft in the British Isles at the time; the F27's flight time on that route was 2 hours and 45 minutes.

=== More growth and jetliners ===
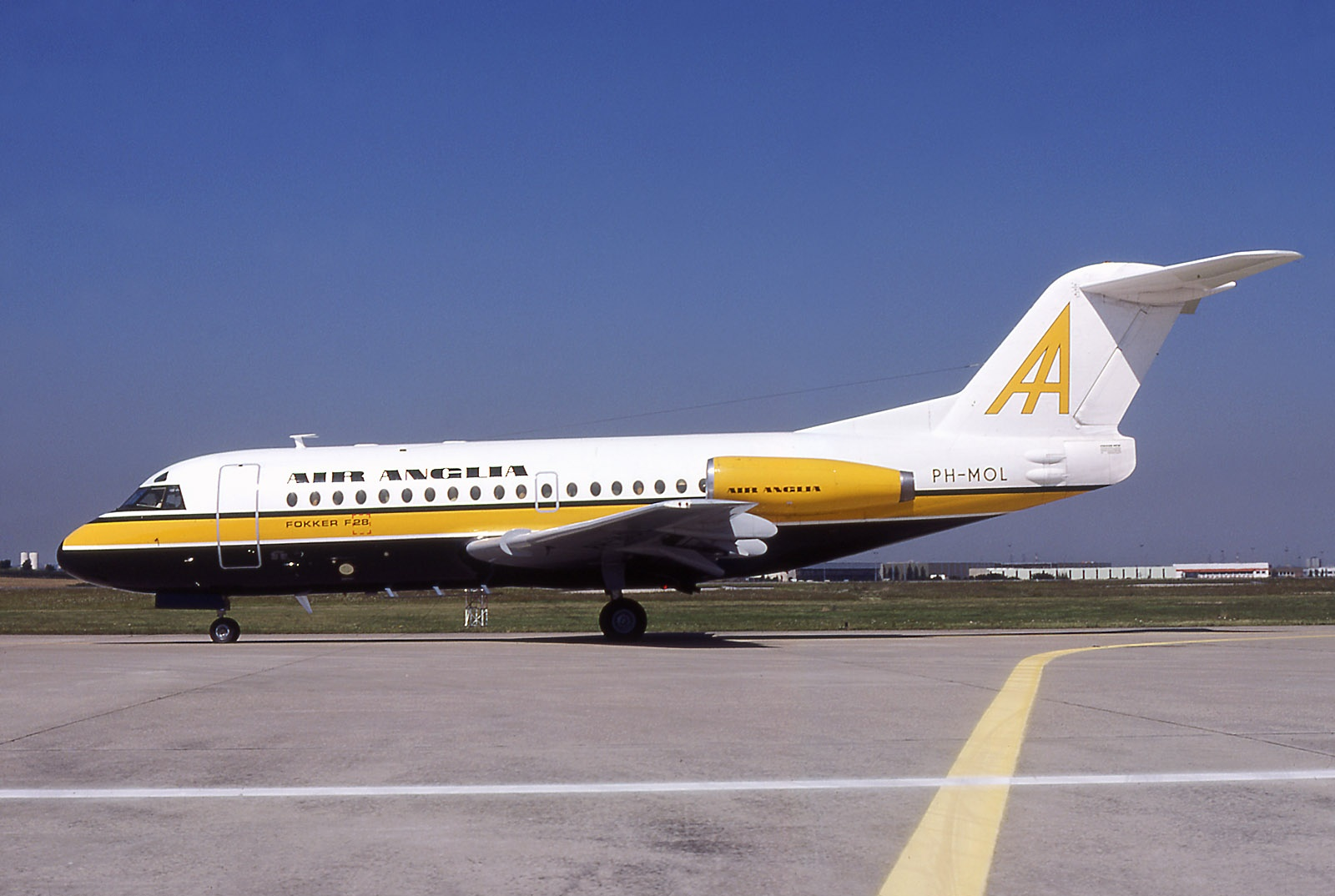
Fokker F-28-1000 Fellowship in 1978

The addition of further Fokker F27s to the airline's fleet over the following years led to the introduction of year-round scheduled services from Aberdeen, Edinburgh, Humberside and Leeds/Bradford to Amsterdam, as well as from Edinburgh via Leeds to Paris Orly and from Aberdeen to Stavanger and Bergen. During the second half of the 1970s Air Anglia also added a pair of Piper PA-31 Navajo Chieftain executive aircraft to its fleet. One of these aircraft was used to launch a new, year round "cross-country" scheduled service linking the airline's Norwich base with Newquay in South West England via Birmingham in the English Midlands and Swansea in Wales. In 1979 Air Anglia launched a year-round scheduled service linking Gatwick with Leeds and extended its domestic year-round scheduled services to Stansted as well. 1979 also saw the introduction of the first jetliner into Air Anglia's fleet, when the airline inaugurated daily, year-round scheduled operations between Aberdeen, Edinburgh and Amsterdam as well as between Aberdeen, Newcastle and Paris, and Edinburgh, Leeds and Paris with a pair of brand-new Fokker F28 Fellowship 4000 series aircraft.

=== A merger creates another regional air carrier ===
At the time of Air Anglia's merger with British Island Airways (BIA), Air Wales and Air Westward to form Air UK in January 1980 its core fleet consisted of two Fokker F28 jetliners and ten Fokker F27 turboprops. This core fleet was supplemented with additional turboprop capacity temporarily leased in from other operators such as British Midland during the annual summer peak travelling season, as well as during periods when its own fleet was undergoing maintenance. Air Anglia hoped that the merger with BIA as well as Air Wales and Air Westward to form Air UK would help improve the merged entity's competitive position vis-à-vis its rivals by giving it a bigger network covering all parts of the UK, which would result from combining Air Anglia's year-round scheduled services linking important oil and gas industry centres in the Eastern half of Britain with BIA's scheduled operations across the Western half of the British Isles. This, in turn, would result in a significant marketing advantage over its rivals. Air Anglia also hoped that this would ultimately translate into a better financial performance as well by enabling the new airline to take advantage of the resulting greater economies of scale, which would permit it to spread its fixed costs over a greater level of activity. In addition, Air Anglia's amalgamation with BIA, a wholly owned subsidiary of British and Commonwealth (B&C), presented an opportunity for Norwich Union to sell its shareholding in Air Anglia to B&C. Indeed Air UK, at the time was the UK's biggest regional airline and its third-largest scheduled operator.

== Fleet ==
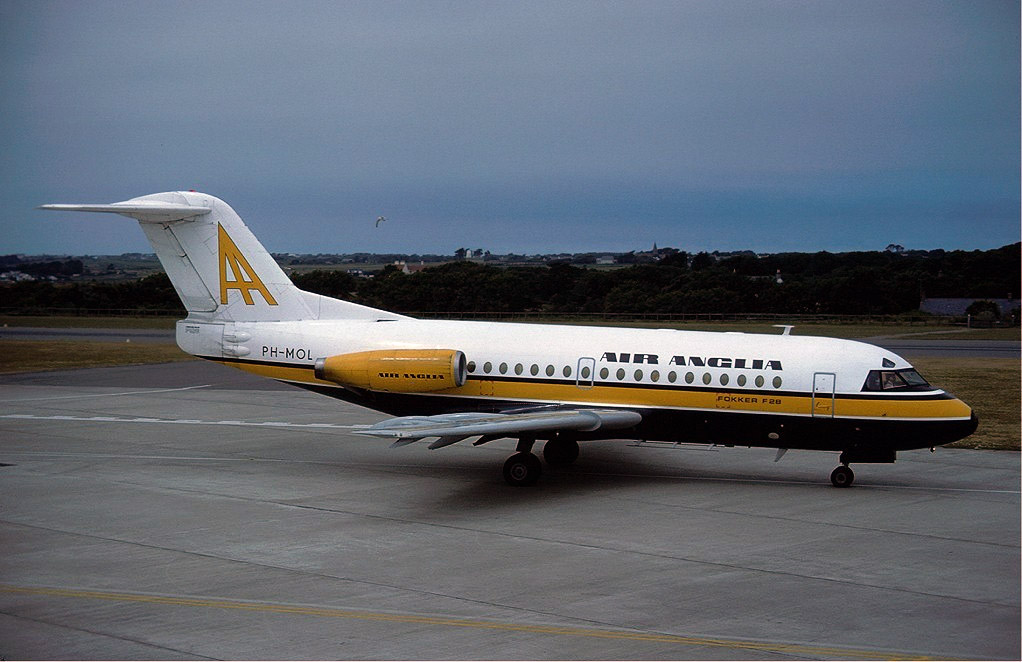
Fokker F28 at Jersey Airport in 1979

Air Anglia operated the following aircraft types at one point or another during its ten-year existence:

- 2 x Armstrong Whitworth Argosy leased in full colors
- 1 x Britten-Norman BN-2A Islander
- 3 x Cessna 172
- Cessna 404
- 4 x Douglas DC-3
- 1 x Embraer EMB-110 Bandeirante
- 15 x Fokker F27 Friendship 100/200 series, including some leased
- 2 x Fokker F28 Fellowship 1000 series leased from Fokker BV
- 2 x Fokker F28 Fellowship 4000 series
- 1 x Handley Page Herald leased from British Midland
- 6 x Piper PA-23 Aztec
- 3 x Piper PA-31 Navajo Chieftain
- 2 x Piper PA-30 Twin Comanche.

== See also ==
- List of defunct airlines of the United Kingdom

== Notes and citations ==
Notes

Citations
