= British Island Airways =

Regional airline of the United Kingdom (1970–1980)

British Island Airways plc

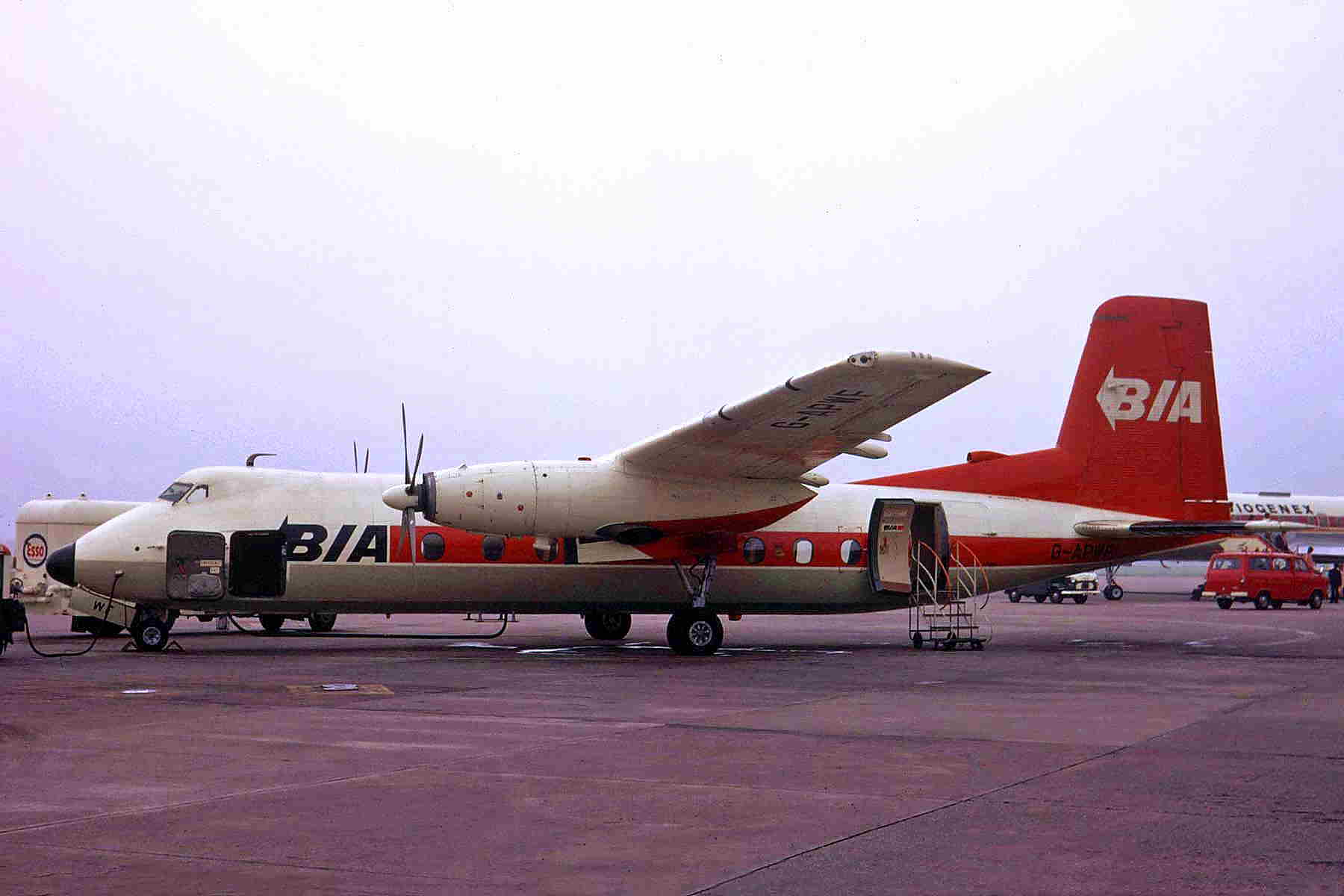
- Handley Page Herald
IATA	ICAO	Call sign
UK / KD	BIA	BRITISLAND
- Founded: 20 July 1970 (UK)
- Ceased operations: 16 January 1980 (merged with Air Anglia to form AirUK)
- Operating bases: Gatwick Airport
- Destinations: British Isles and Europe
- Headquarters: Redhill, Surrey, England; Crawley, West Sussex, England (KD)
- Key people: Anthony Cayzer (Chairman); Wg Cdr L.B. "Bill" Elwin (Managing Director, 1970–1977); Peter Villa (Managing Director (1977–1980) and also Chairman of 2nd BIA (1980-1990)

British Island Airways plc (BIA) was the successor to British United Island Airways (BUIA). It commenced operations under that name in mid-1970. Ten years later it merged with Air Anglia, Air Wales and Air Westward to form Air UK, at the time the United Kingdom's biggest regional airline and its third-largest scheduled operator. The first British Island Airways had its head office at Congreve House (1970–1972) and Berkeley House (1973–1979), which are respectively located in Station Road and on the high street in Redhill, Surrey.

In 1982 British Island Airways was reconstituted by splitting off the charter operation Air UK had inherited from BIA at the time of its creation into a separate company. This second air carrier ceased operations in 1991.

== History ==
=== Origin ===
British Island Airways Ltd. was the new name of BUIA, the regional affiliate of British United Airways (BUA), adopted on 20 July 1970. At that time the airline adopted a new livery as well.

When in late November of that year Caledonian Airways acquired BUA from British & Commonwealth (B&C), the owner of both BUA and BUIA at the time, the latter's assets were not included in that deal. As a result, BUA's former parent company continued to own BIA.

Following the completion of BUA's sale to Caledonian on 30 November 1970, BUIA went on in its own right the following day, 1 December 1970.

=== 1st British Island Airways (1970–1980) ===
BIA's corporate headquarters was located at Redhill, Surrey. The airline's main engineering base was at Blackpool while its main operating base was at London Gatwick. Other airports that used to receive BIA's regular scheduled passenger services in the early to mid-1970s included Antwerp, Belfast, Blackpool, Dublin, Edinburgh, Exeter, Glasgow, Guernsey, the Isle of Man, Jersey, Manchester, Newcastle, Paris Orly and Southampton. Many of the services to the Channel Islands and the Isle of Man were operated on a seasonal basis — exceptions being year-round operations linking Gatwick with Guernsey, Southampton with both Channel Islands and the Isle of Man with Blackpool and Belfast. BIA's scheduled route network was considerably enlarged in 1979 when it assumed the entire scheduled operation of British Air Ferries (BAF).

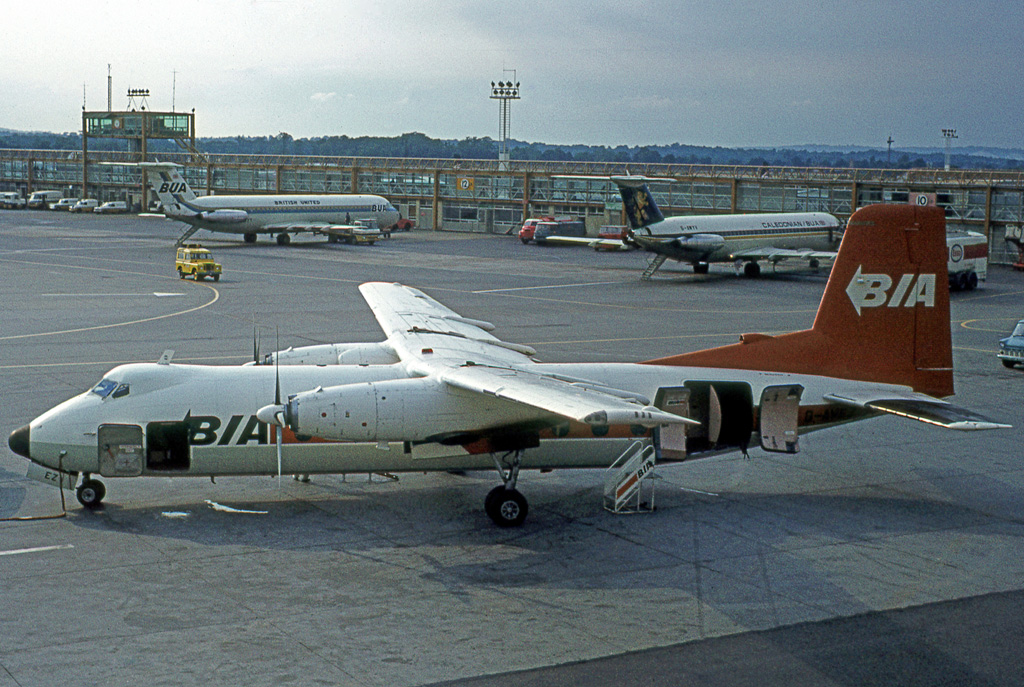
BIA Handley Page Herald at London Gatwick in 1971

All passenger services were operated with a fleet of 50-seat Handley Page Dart Herald turboprops. Each of these aircraft was convertible, enabling them to be used to operate all-cargo services as well. BIA inherited most of these aircraft at the time of its inception from BUIA. It subsequently acquired additional second-hand examples from various other sources.

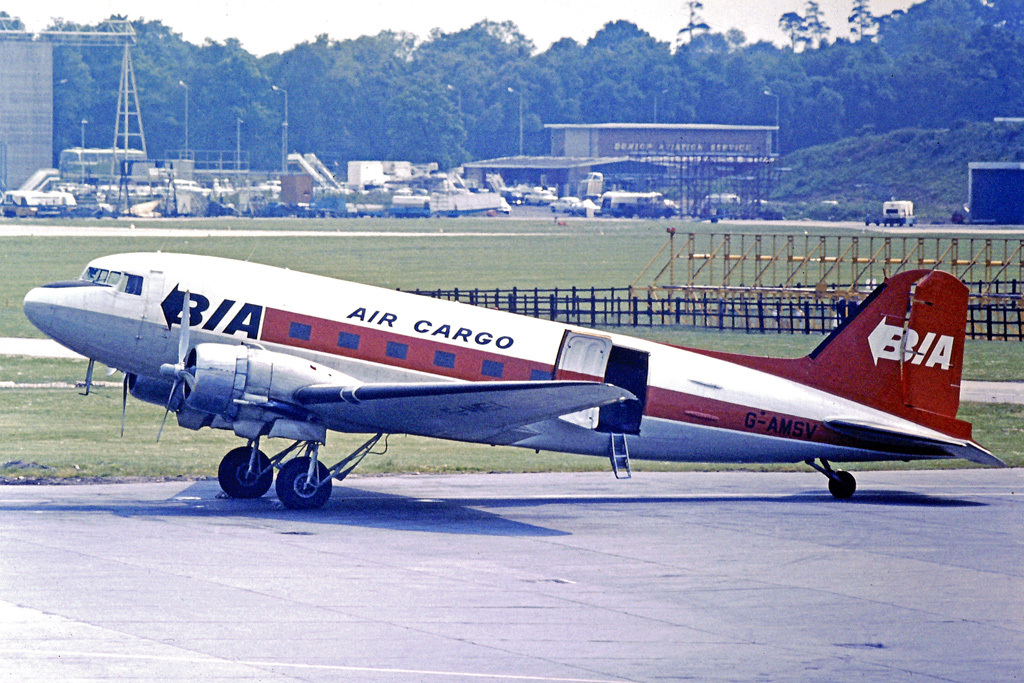
Douglas DC-3 freighter of BIA Cargo at London Gatwick in 1973

In addition to its Herald turboprop fleet, BIA also inherited a small number of Douglas DC-3 "Dakota" piston-engined airliners from BUIA. These exclusively operated freight services until the last example's retirement on 30 May 1974. Until then, the DC-3 freighters (together with the convertible Heralds) were kept busy carrying mail and cargo, including fresh flowers from the Channel Islands to the UK mainland (principally Bournemouth and Gatwick) as well as overnight newspaper deliveries from Gatwick under contract to the Ministry of Defence to supply the UK's armed forces in Germany.

A limited amount of charter flying (passenger and freight) also occurred, including BIA's speciality of one-hour aerial geography trips for school groups from the Gatwick catchment area, which took advantage of the Herald's superb downward passenger visibility (due to high wings and relatively large windows) on low altitude flying tours of Southeast England, usually incorporating a traverse of the south coasts of Kent, Sussex and Hampshire and the opportunity to see the North and South Downs plus the Weald from the air.

Following the DC-3's retirement, BIA standardised its fleet on twelve Handley Page Dart Herald turboprops. The airline augmented its core fleet during the busy summer holiday period when it leased in additional Heralds from other operators, such as British Midland, on a wet lease basis.

To justify the introduction of larger, more modern jet aircraft types into its fleet as well as to substantially improve its financial performance, BIA needed access to higher volume, higher profile year-round scheduled routes that had the potential to attract a significant number of business travellers.

In 1977, BIA applied to the Civil Aviation Authority (CAA) to serve Dublin, Copenhagen, Hamburg, Frankfurt, Zürich and Geneva from Gatwick on a regular, year-round scheduled basis. (At that time British Airways, British Caledonian and Dan-Air applied to serve these and other destinations from Gatwick on a regular scheduled basis as well.) In support of its application, BIA had proposed to begin operating these services with three 65-seater Fokker F-28 1000 series "Fellowship" jet aircraft, which it was planning to acquire second-hand from Germanair, rather than the larger BAC One-Eleven 500s its rivals had planned to use on their services. These had almost twice the seating capacity of the Fokker jets. Using smaller aircraft would have enabled BIA to offer more frequent flights, thereby offering a more attractive product for the business travel market. BIA reckoned that this would improve its chances of being awarded these licences.

In the event, the CAA decided to reject both BIA's and Dan-Air's applications while approving British Airways' and British Caledonian's applications. It argued that BIA and Dan-Air, unlike British Airways and British Caledonian, lacked the necessary expertise to take on the established scheduled airlines on major international trunk routes. The agreement with British Air Ferries to take over the operation of that airline's scheduled services from BAF's Southend base resulted in BIA leasing the seven Heralds BAF had used to operate these services. The addition of the ex-BAF aircraft expanded BIA's operational Herald fleet to 19 aircraft from 1979 onwards.

1979 also saw the adoption of BIA's second and final new livery as well as the acquisition of a dedicated charter fleet comprising four 89-seat BAC One-Eleven 400s, the first jet aircraft in BIA's history. Three of these were ex-Gulfair while the fourth was previously operated by the Indonesian government.

In addition to operating regional, short-haul scheduled services on its own account, BIA was also contracted by other airlines to operate scheduled services on their behalf.

British Caledonian contracted BIA to operate its Gatwick—Manchester service between 1973 and 1976 (the aircraft operating this service continued on to Blackpool and the Isle of Man during the peak summer holiday season from 1975 onwards operating as BIA flights with UK flight designators) as well as the Gatwick—Le Touquet air portion of that airline's London—Paris Silver Arrow/Flèche d'argent rail-air service and the Gatwick—Rotterdam route between 1975 and 1979. (In 1979 British Caledonian granted BIA permission to prefix all flights it operated from Gatwick to Le Touquet and Rotterdam under contract to that airline with its own two-letter UK airline designator (in addition to British Caledonian's BR designator).)

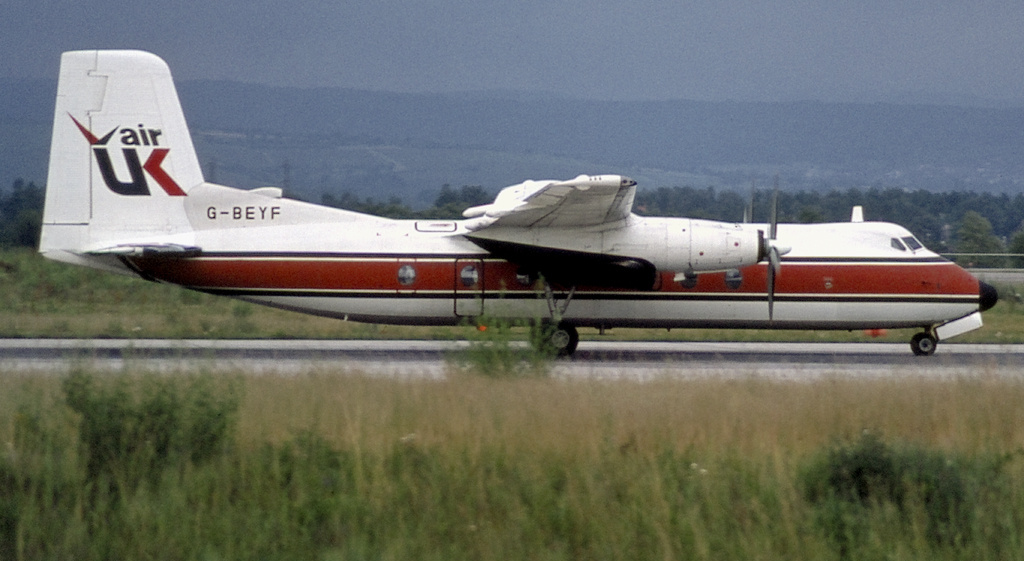
One of seven Handley Page Heralds leased by the 1st BIA from BAF. The aircraft, a serie 400, wears a hybrid BIA-Air UK livery. It was at Basle Airport in July 1980.

Sabena contracted BIA to operate its London Heathrow—Antwerp route. Occasionally, BIA also operated Dan-Air's scheduled service between Gatwick and Bern, which involved special crew training and permits due to the hazardous alpine terrain surrounding the Swiss federal capital.

BIA hoped that the merger with Air Anglia, as well as Air Wales and Air Westward, to form Air UK in January 1980 would help it transform its financial performance by counterbalancing its predominantly seasonal scheduled operations across the Western half of the British Isles with Air Anglia's year-round scheduled services linking important oil and gas industry centres covering the Eastern half of the United Kingdom, as well as by spreading fixed costs over a greater level of activity as a result of the new airline combine's greater economies of scale.

==== Aircraft fleet and employment details ====
The original BIA operated the following aircraft types:

- BAC One-Eleven 400
- Handley Page HPR 7 Dart Herald 100/200/400 series
- Embraer EMB 110 Bandeirante
- Douglas DC-3/C-47

===== Fleet and employment data in 1971 =====
In May 1971, BIA's fleet comprised 11 aircraft (8 turboprops + 3 piston airliners).

Aircraft	Number
Handley Page HPR 7 Dart Herald 200	8
Douglas DC-3 Dakota	3
Total	11

BIA employed 600 people at this time.

===== Fleet and employment data in 1975 =====
In March 1975, BIA's fleet comprised 12 turboprop aircraft.

Aircraft	Number
Handley Page HPR 7 Dart Herald 200	12
Total	12

BIA employed 600 people at this time.

===== Fleet and employment data in 1979 =====
In late 1979, BIA's fleet comprised 26 aircraft (4 jets + 22 turboprops).

Aircraft	Number
BAC One-Eleven 400	4
Handley Page HPR 7 Dart Herald 200/400	20
Embraer EMB 110 Bandeirante	2
Total	26

BIA employed 1,000 people at this time (April 1979).

=== 2nd British Island Airways (1982–1990) ===
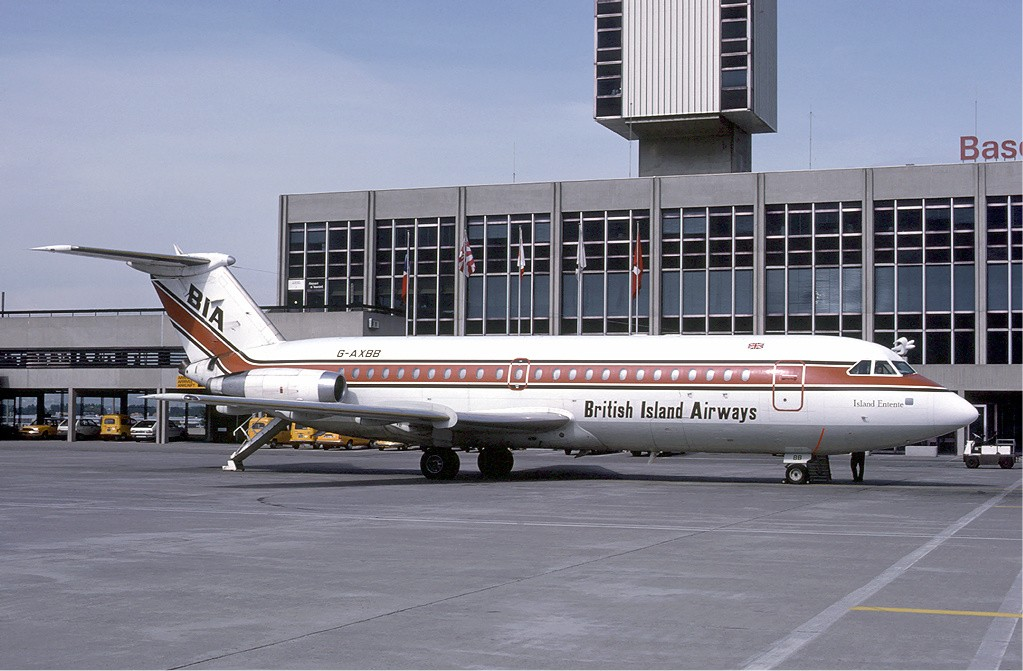
2nd BIA BAC One-Eleven 400 at Basle Airport, June 1985

Following several unsuccessful attempts to sell the loss-making charter operation Air UK had inherited at the time of its formation from the original BIA to another airline, Peter Villa, then the Air UK managing director (as well as the original BIA's [second] MD), decided in early 1982 to reconstitute BIA as a charter airline. This involved Villa's purchase of BIA Ltd, a wholly owned B&C subsidiary that had assumed the ownership of Air UK's non-scheduled division to facilitate its eventual disposal, with a loan from the owners. The "new BIA" was headquartered at Apollo House on the industrial estate in Crawley's Lowfield Heath area (close to Gatwick Airport). It commenced operations on 1 April 1982 with the four One-Eleven 400s the original BIA had acquired in 1979 to establish a charter operation. These aircraft, which sported the same livery as the original BIA's second and final livery, were subsequently supplemented with four second-hand 500 series One-Elevens, as well as four brand-new McDonnell-Douglas MD-80s, which entered service during the second half of the 1980s.

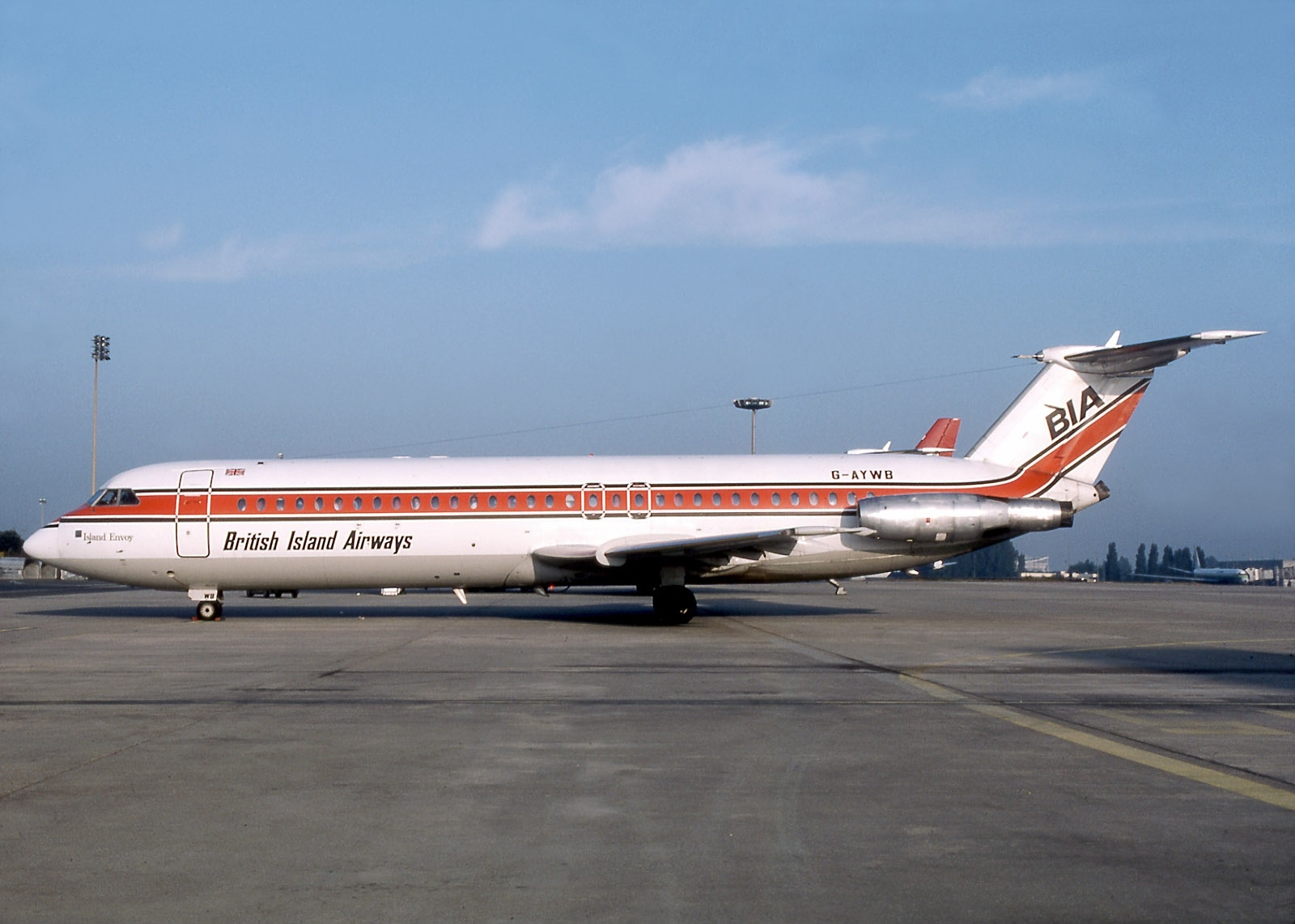
One-Eleven 500

The 89-seat One-Eleven 400s and 119-seat One-Eleven 500s filled a niche in the UK charter market, which at the time was dominated by 130-seat Boeing 737-200s operated by BIA's much bigger, vertically integrated competitors. (Note: chiefly Thomson Holidays' sister airline Britannia Airways and International Leisure Group airline subsidiary Air Europe) These smaller, second-hand aircraft's lower acquisition costs (compared with the competition's bigger and newer 737-200s) enabled BIA to offer tour operators lower capacity aircraft at keener rates, giving it a competitive advantage on less dense routes. The One-Eleven 400's ability to match the 737-200's range, as well as both One-Eleven variants' ability to match the 737's fuel consumption and to comply with stricter, post-1985 noise abatement rules (as a result of having hush kits fitted to their engines), further enhanced BIA's competitiveness vis-à-vis its rivals. This helped attract business from the big tour operators that owned its rivals, (Note: including Thomas Cook, International Leisure Group and Owners Abroad) especially to secondary European ski destinations served in winter where the lower trip costs of BIA's older planes outweighed the seat-mile cost advantage of the in-house airlines' technologically more advanced equipment. This in turn helped minimise the tour operators' risk, thereby representing a 'win-win' situation for both parties. A well-subscribed, subsequent stock market flotation that changed BIA's legal status from a privately owned to a public limited company financed future growth.

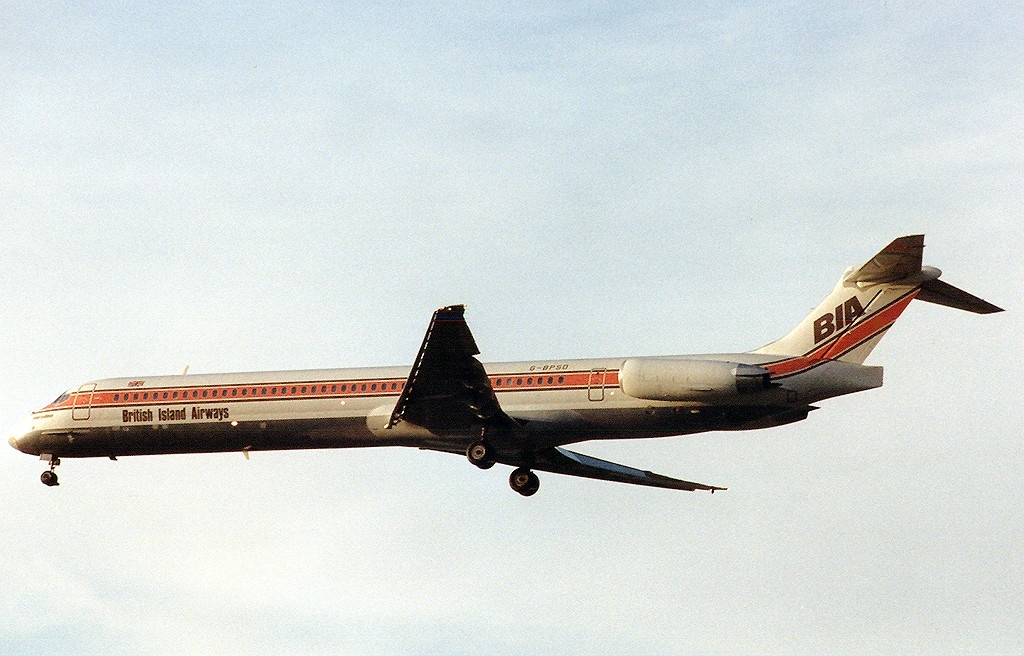
MD-83

The addition of the larger capacity, technologically advanced MD-83s during the second half of the 1980s enabled BIA to offer tour operators a state-of-the-art aircraft filling the niche between the 119-seat One-Eleven 500 and the 228/235-seat Boeing 757-200, which increasingly dominated its vertically integrated rivals' fleets (Note: led by Britannia Airways, Air Europe, Air 2000 and Monarch Airlines) during that period. It also enabled the airline to offer tour operators a more advanced aircraft with substantially lower operating costs than the similarly sized Boeing 727-200 Advanced operated by rival independent (Note: independent from government-owned corporations) UK airline Dan-Air.

In addition to supplying various package tour operators, including Thomas Cook, International Leisure Group (ILG) and Owners Abroad, with whole-plane charter seats, the reconstituted airline was also contracted by other airlines to provide the aircraft to operate part of their multi-leg scheduled services, including Air Florida during the early 1980s and Virgin Atlantic during the mid-1980s. During those periods BIA One-Eleven 400s were operating the Gatwick—Amsterdam portion of the former's Miami—London (Gatwick)—Amsterdam route as well as a Gatwick—Maastricht feeder operation for the latter's transatlantic long-haul services.

By the late-1980s, BIA became profitable, marking the completion of the airline's successful financial turnaround. During late-1988 and early-1989 intense negotiations exploring BIA's sale to ILG were held over several weeks. At that time ILG sought to take control of BIA because of the airline's slots at an increasingly congested Gatwick as well as the fact that it was a major supplier of ILG's charter capacity. BIA's Gatwick slots were required to enable fellow Gatwick-based Air Europe, ILG's rapidly expanding airline subsidiary, to build a major scheduled presence at that airport. Furthermore, ILG's ownership of BIA would have given the ILG-owned package tour operators, notably Intasun, a greater degree of control over their charter airline seat inventory. In addition, BIA's scheduled route licences to serve Sicily and other niche market destinations in Southern Italy from Gatwick could have potentially aided Air Europe's efforts to further expand the reach of its scheduled route network. However, both parties were unable to reach a firm deal that would have resulted in ILG's acquisition of BIA.

Ultimately, BIA's inability to become part of a bigger, financially stronger organisation, the deep recession in the UK during the early 1990s, as well as the escalating jet fuel price and the collapse of the package tour market in the run-up to the first Gulf War during the summer of 1990 resulted in a 38% reduction in its passenger traffic (compared with the same period the year before) and were the main factors that forced the reconstituted BIA to cease all operations on 9 February 1990.

==== Aircraft fleet and employment details ====
The reconstituted BIA operated the following aircraft types:

- BAC One-Eleven 400
- BAC/ROMBAC One-Eleven 500
- McDonnell-Douglas MD-80

===== Fleet and employment data in 1982 =====
In April 1982, BIA's fleet comprised 4 jet aircraft.

Aircraft	Number
BAC One-Eleven 400	4
Total	4

BIA employed 115 people at this time.

===== Fleet and employment data in 1985 =====
In March 1985, BIA's fleet comprised 6 jet aircraft.

Aircraft	Number
BAC One-Eleven 500	2
BAC One-Eleven 400	4
Total	6

BIA employed 120 people at this time.

===== Fleet and employment data in 1989 =====
In April 1989, BIA's fleet comprised 12 jet aircraft.

Aircraft	Number
McDonnell-Douglas MD-83	4
BAC One-Eleven 500	4
BAC One-Eleven 400	4
Total	12

BIA employed 480 people at this time.

== Accidents and incidents ==
There are two recorded, non-fatal incidents involving aircraft operated by first BIA during its ten-year existence from 1970 until 1980.

- The first of these incidents occurred on 20 December 1974 involving one of the airline's Handley Page Dart Herald turboprops (registration: G-BBXJ) in a landing accident at Jersey Airport. The aircraft was damaged beyond repair but there were no injuries among the 54 occupants.
- The second incident occurred on 20 July 1975. It involved another of the company's Handley Page Dart Heralds (registration: G-APWF) in a runway accident while departing London Gatwick on a scheduled flight to Guernsey. According to eye-witness reports, the aircraft lifted off from runway 26 after a ground run of 2,490 ft (760 m) and appeared airborne for 411 ft (125 m) with its landing gear retracting before the rear underside of the fuselage settled back on to the runway. None of the 45 occupants, including the 41 passengers who were safely evacuated via the aircraft's crew entrance door by the two cabin crew members on the instructions of the flight's commander, were hurt in that accident. The subsequent investigation concluded that this accident had been caused by the landing gear being retracted before the aircraft had been properly established in its initial climb. Other contributory factors included a mistaken wing flap configuration and the resulting inadequate airspeed at rotation. The aircraft itself sustained substantial damage and required extensive repairs in order to be restored to an airworthy condition.

In addition to the two aforementioned incidents, in 1979, BIA's maintenance engineers had discovered fatigue cracks in the fuselages of some of the firm's Heralds during routine inspections of the aircraft. This required the affected aircraft to be taken out of service to repair the cracks.

There is one recorded, non-fatal incident involving an aircraft operated by the reconstituted BIA.

This incident occurred on 12 April 1988. It involved a BAC One-Eleven 500 (registration: G-AYWB). The aircraft, which had been cleared to land on Gatwick's runway 08L (the airport's standby runway), inadvertently landed on the parallel taxiway. An air traffic controller in Gatwick's control tower, who spotted the BIA One-Eleven coming in to land on the taxiway parallel to the emergency runway, ordered a British Airways Boeing 737 that had just entered the same taxiway to vacate it immediately. This resulted in the 737 taxiing right into the grass and the One-Eleven stopping 100–200 m to the west of the 737's position.
