= AirUK =

Airline of the United Kingdom (1980–1998)

Air UK

- AirUK Fokker 50
IATA	ICAO	Call sign
UK	UKA	UKAY
- Founded: 1 January 1980
- Commenced operations: 16 January 1980 (constituents amalgamation)
- Ceased operations: 1 November 2002 (merged into KLM Cityhopper UK/KLM UK)
- Operating bases: Blackpool; Norwich
- Alliance: KLM
- Subsidiaries: Air UK Leisure, Air UK Engineering
- Fleet size: 36 (April 1997)
- Destinations: British Isles; Continental Europe
- Parent company: KLM
- Headquarters: London Stansted Airport, England
- Key people: Peter Villa Managing Director; Andrew Gray Managing Director (successor); David Henry Fleet Manager
- Website: www.airuk.co.uk

Air U.K. Limited, branded as AirUK, was a regional airline in the United Kingdom formed in 1980 as a result of a merger involving four rival UK-based regional airlines. British & Commonwealth Holdings-owned British Island Airways (BIA) and Air Anglia were the two dominant merger partners.

The merged entity's corporate headquarters were originally located at Redhill, the location of the old BIA head office. It subsequently relocated to Crawley. In addition to the main maintenance base at Norwich Airport (Air Anglia's former engineering base), there also used to be a second major maintenance base at Blackpool Airport (the old BIA engineering base). This was closed down following Air UK's major retrenchment during the early 1980s recession.

In 1987, Air UK established Air UK Leisure as a charter subsidiary. The following year, Air UK shifted its headquarters to Stansted Airport. When Stansted's new Foster + Partners designed terminal opened in 1991, the airline became its first and subsequently main tenant.

Air UK was a full member of the International Air Transport Association (IATA) for most of its existence.

Air UK originally was a wholly owned subsidiary of British Air Transport Holdings, a successor to the Air Holdings Group owned 90% by B&C and 10% by Eagle Star Insurance. This made the Cayzer family, who owned B&C, the controlling shareholders.

Following the beginning of the gradual liberalisation of the European Union (EU) internal air transport market in 1987, Dutch flag carrier KLM, a long-standing business partner of Air UK and its predecessor Air Anglia, acquired a 14.9% minority stake in Air UK's holding company. In 1995, KLM increased its minority stake in Air UK to 45%. In 1997, KLM became Air UK's sole shareholder when it acquired B&C's stake in British Air Transport (Holdings). The following year Air UK was renamed KLM UK.

== History ==
=== Aircraft operated ===
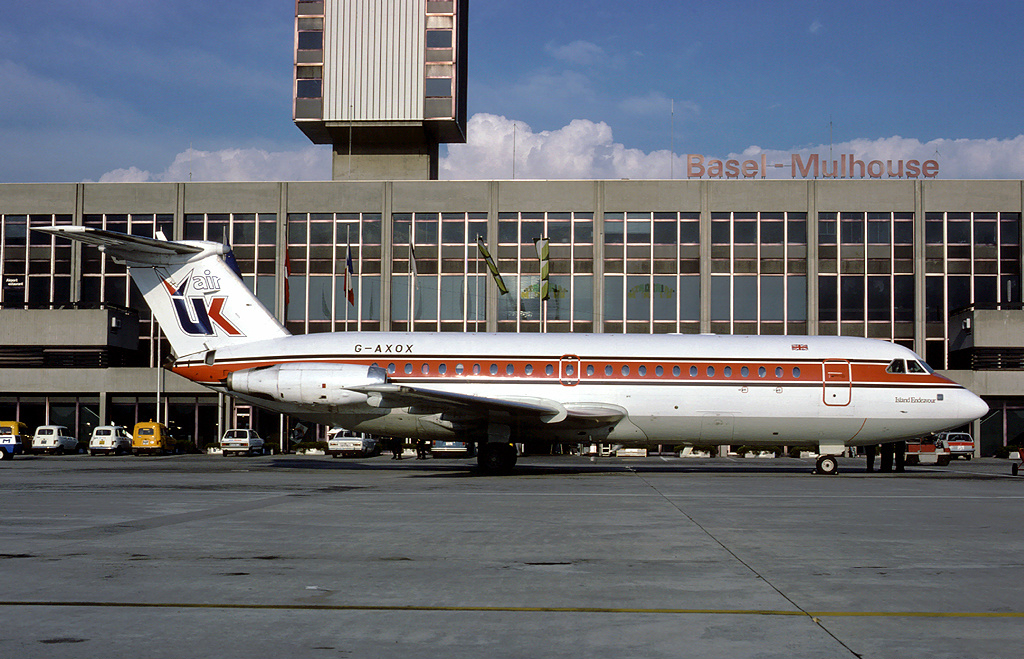
BAC One-Eleven still in basic BIA livery at Basel/Mulhouse EuroAirport in 1980

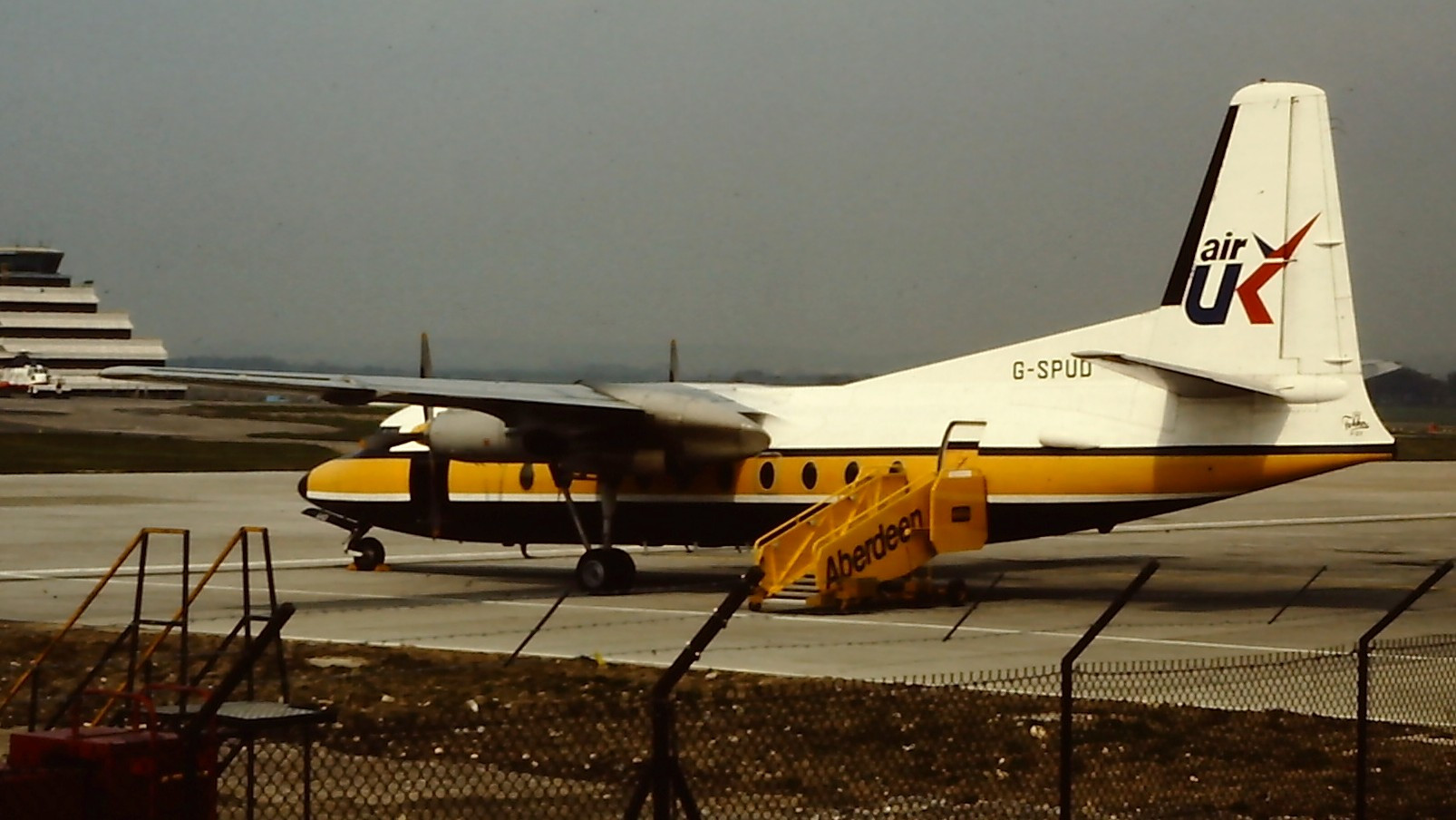
Fokker F27 still in basic Air Anglia livery at Aberdeen Airport in 1981

Air UK operated the following aircraft types at one point or another during its 19-year existence:

- Avion de Transport Regional (ATR) ATR-72 (these aircraft were exclusively operated by KLM uk)
- BAC One-Eleven 200/400 series
- British Aerospace 146 100/200/300 series
- Embraer EMB-110 Bandeirante
- Fokker F27 100/200/400/500/600 series
- Fokker F28 Fellowship 1000/4000 series
- Fokker 50
- Fokker 100
- Handley Page Dart Herald
- Shorts 330
- Shorts 360

=== Fleet in 1980 ===
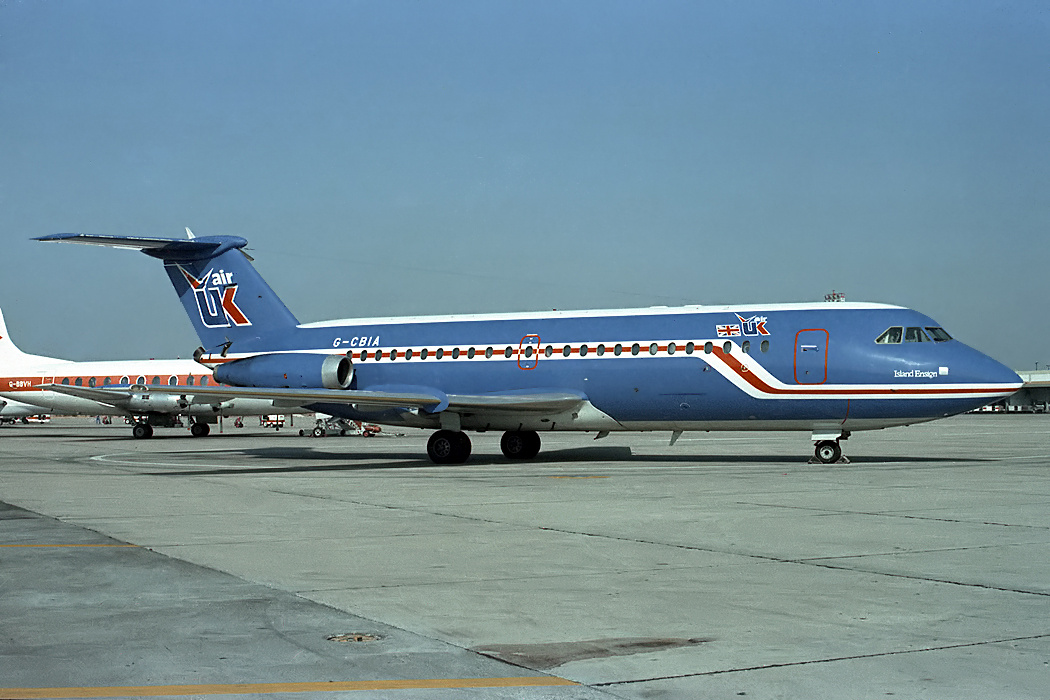
One-Eleven in the original all-blue scheme in 1981

In July 1980 the Air UK fleet comprised 37 aircraft.

Air UK fleet in July 1980
Aircraft	Number
BAC One-Eleven 400	4
Fokker F28 Fellowship 4000	2
Fokker F27 Friendship 200	14
Handley Page Dart Herald	11
Embraer EMB-110 Bandeirante	6
Total	37

Air UK employed 1,700 people at this time.

=== Fleet in 1983 ===
In April 1983 the Air UK fleet comprised 21 aircraft.

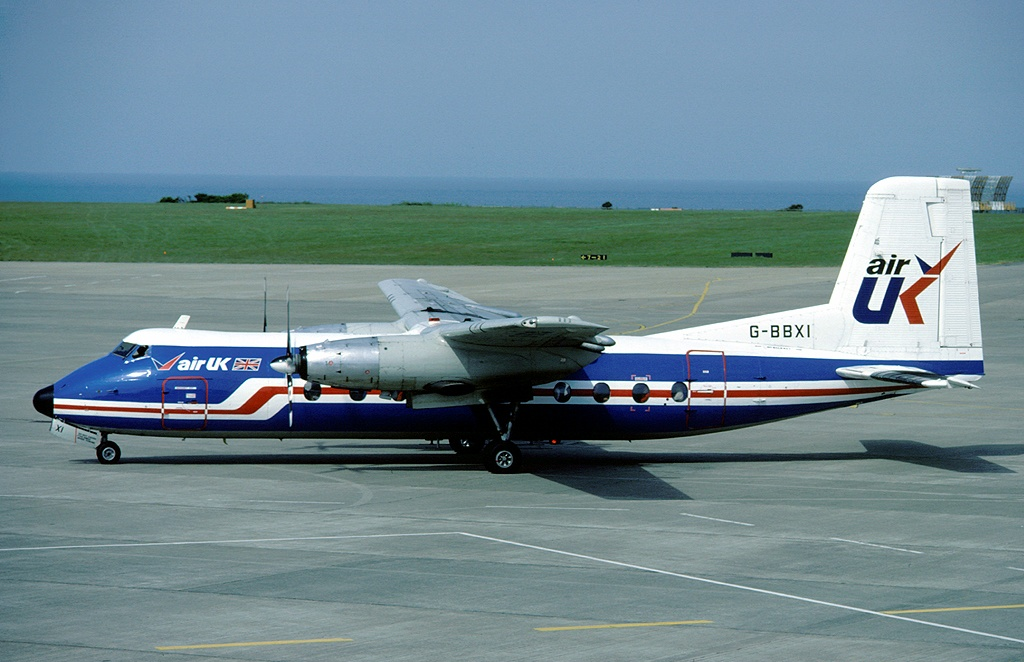
Handley Page Dart Herald in the modified blue-and-white scheme at Jersey Airport in 1983

Air UK fleet in April 1983
Aircraft	Number
Fokker F27 Friendship 200	10
Handley Page Dart Herald	6
Embraer EMB-110 Bandeirante	5
Total	21

Air UK employed 850 people at this time.

=== Fleet in 1985 ===
In March 1985 the Air UK fleet comprised 22 aircraft.

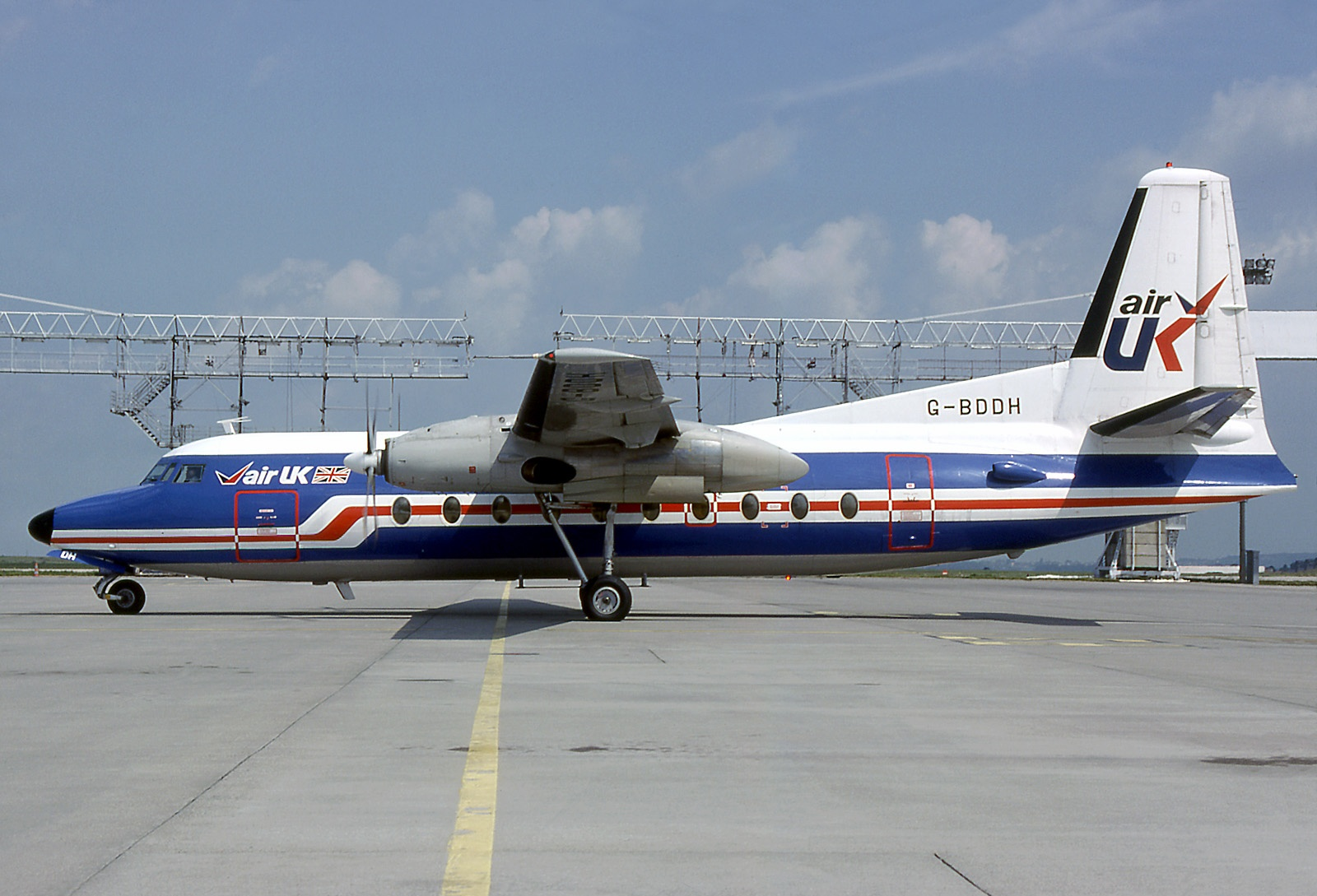
Fokker F27 in the modified blue-and-white scheme at Charles de Gaulle Airport in 1985

Air UK fleet in March 1985
Aircraft	Number
Fokker F28 Fellowship 1000	1
Fokker F27 Friendship 200	16
Shorts 360	4
Shorts 330	1
Total	22

Air UK employed 850 people at this time.

=== Fleet in 1988 ===
In March 1988 the Air UK fleet comprised 22 aircraft.

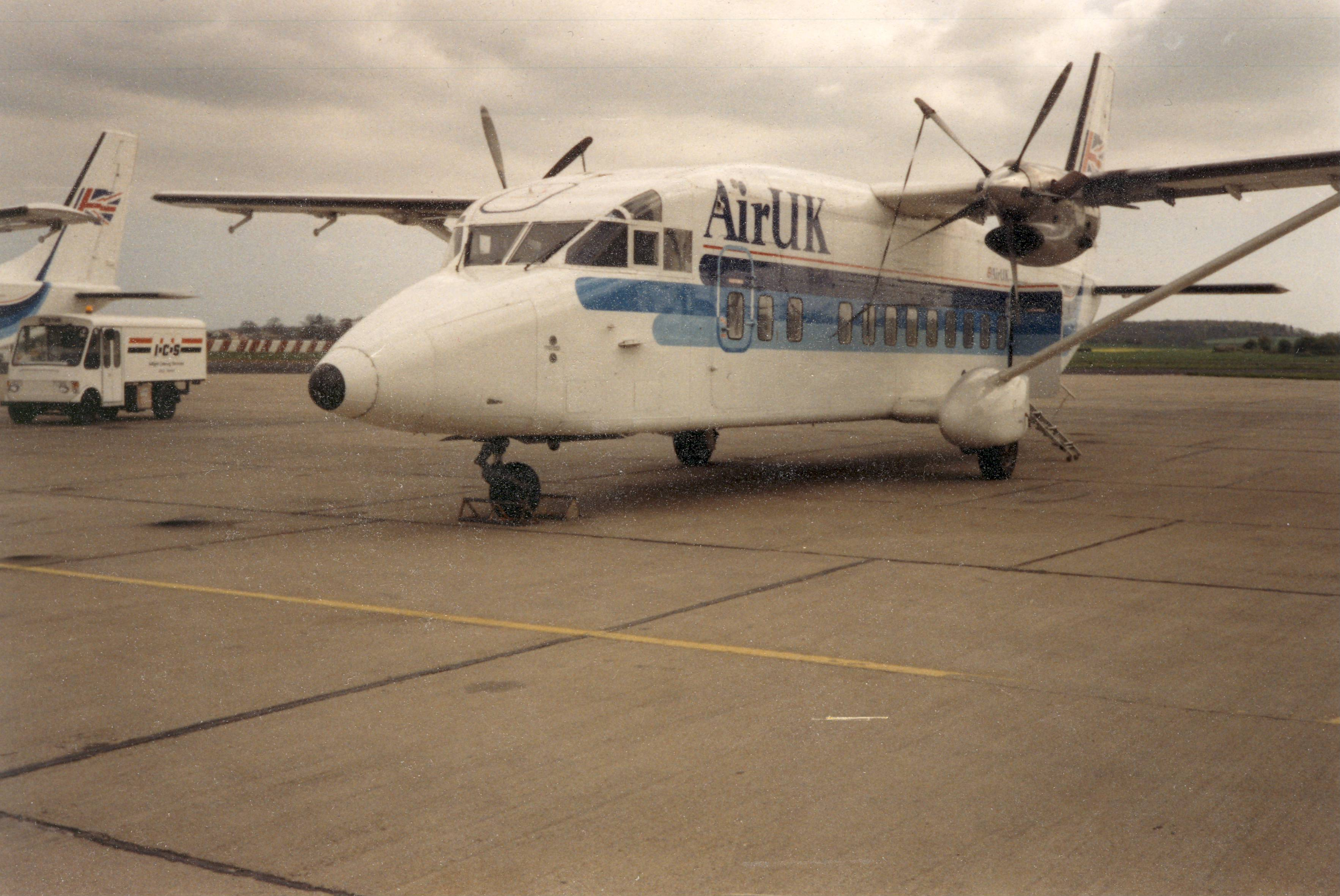
A pair of Shorts 360s in the second scheme at Humberside Airport in 1989

Air UK fleet in March 1988
Aircraft	Number
BAC One-Eleven 400	1
British Aerospace BAe 146-200	1
Fokker F27 Friendship 500	2
Fokker F27 Friendship 600	3
Fokker F27 Friendship 200	10
Fokker F27 Friendship 100	1
Shorts 360	4
Total	22

Two British Aerospace BAe 146-200 were on order.

Air UK employed 975 people at this time.

=== Fleet in 1990 ===
In March 1990 the Air UK fleet comprised 27 aircraft.

Air UK fleet in March 1990
Aircraft	Number
British Aerospace BAe 146-300	4
British Aerospace BAe 146-200	3
British Aerospace BAe 146-100	2
Fokker F27 Friendship 500	2
Fokker F27 Friendship 600	2
Fokker F27 Friendship 200	11
Fokker F27 Friendship 100	1
Shorts 360	2
Total	27

Air UK employed 1,340 people at this time.

=== Fleet in 1995 ===
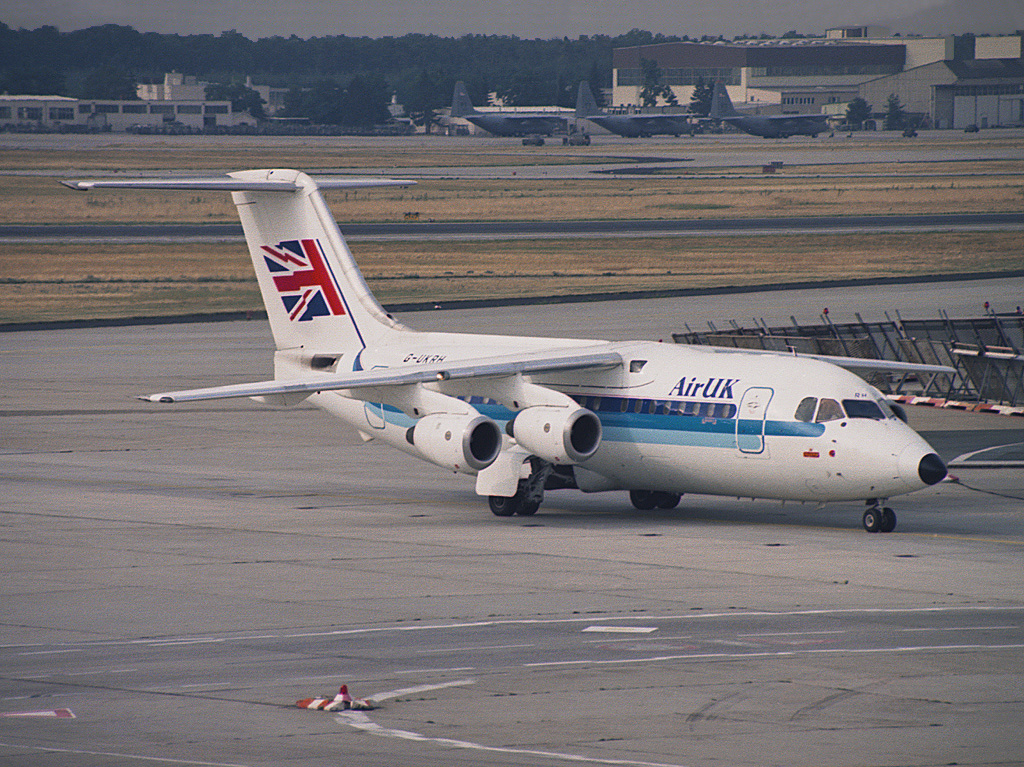
BAe 146-200 in the second scheme at Frankfurt Airport in 1994

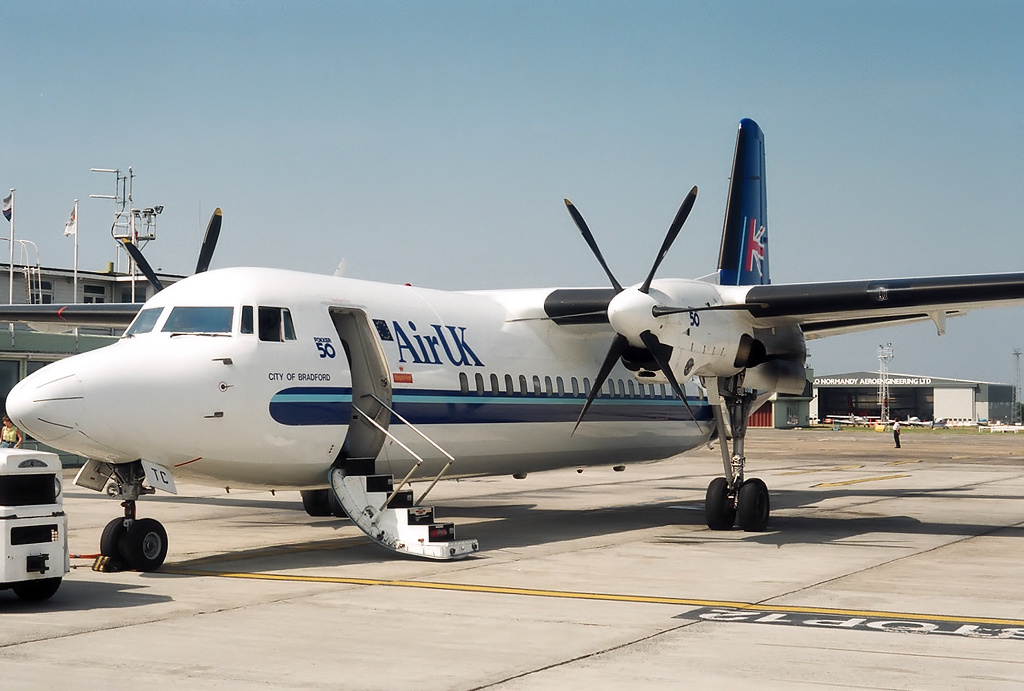
Fokker 50 in the final scheme at Guernsey Airport in 1995

In March/April 1995 the Air UK fleet comprised 28 aircraft.

Air UK fleet in March/April 1995
Aircraft	Number
British Aerospace BAe 146-300	7
British Aerospace BAe 146-200	2
British Aerospace BAe 146-100	2
Fokker F27 Friendship 500	6
Fokker 50	1
Fokker 100	9
Shorts 360	1
Total	28

Eight Fokker 50 were on order.

Air UK employed 1,466 people at this time.

=== Fleet in 1997 ===
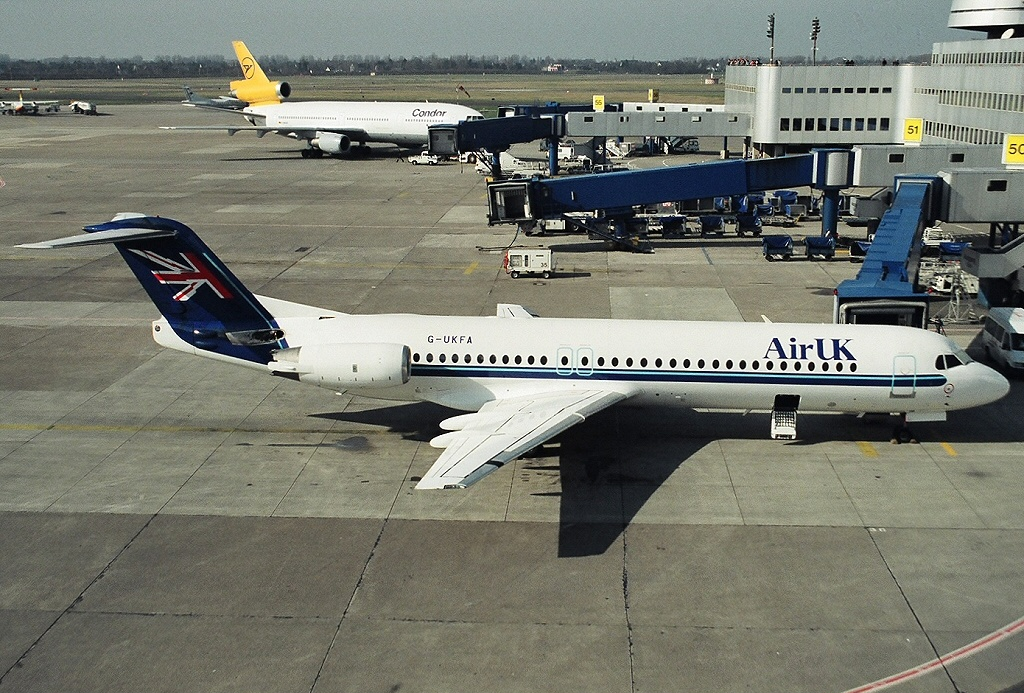
Fokker 100 in the final scheme at Düsseldorf Airport in 1997

In March/April 1997 the Air UK fleet comprised 36 aircraft.

Air UK fleet in March/April 1997
Aircraft	Number
British Aerospace BAe 146-300	10
British Aerospace BAe 146-100	1
Fokker F27 Friendship 500	5
Fokker 50	9
Fokker 100	11
Total	36

Four Fokker 100 were on order.

Air UK employed 2,000 people at this time.

=== Third Force ===
Air UK was the name of the new airline resulting from the merger of BIA and Air Anglia. (BIA had already absorbed Exeter based Air Westward in March 1979). Cardiff-based Air Wales had become part of Air Anglia in June of that year.) It was incorporated on 1 January 1980. Operations commenced on 16 January 1980. At the time of its inception, Air UK was the largest regional airline in the UK and the country's third-largest scheduled carrier. It had a staff of 1,700, carried more than 1m, mainly scheduled, passengers annually and had a fleet of 40 aircraft, consisting of six jets (four ex-BIA BAC One-Eleven 400s and two ex-Air Anglia F-28 4000 series Fellowships) and 34 turboprops (including eighteen ex-BIA Handley Page Dart Heralds, ten ex-Air Anglia Fokker F27 100/200 series Friendships and six Embraer 110 Bandeirantes originally part of the BIA, Air Wales and Air Westward fleets). Apart from the four One-Eleven 400s, which were predominantly operated on charter flights, all the other aircraft were part of Air UK's scheduled service fleet.

For marketing purposes, there was no gap between the letters "U" and "K" in the "Air UK" logo in the newly merged entity's first livery, which was a stylised Union Flag.

Former BIA managing director Peter Villa became Air UK's first MD as well.

At the time of its creation, Air UK was sometimes referred to as the unofficial "Third Force" among the main contemporary scheduled airlines in the UK (British Caledonian (BCal) being the UK's official "Second Force" and British Airways (BA) the primary UK flag carrier at that time).

Following the merger, most of the fleet progressively adopted Air UK's new blue, white and red colour scheme. Originally, this featured a predominantly blue fuselage with a white-red-white strip across the windows and a white roof. The tail was also predominantly blue, apart from the "Air UK" logo. However, the Civil Aviation Authority (CAA) disapproved of this predominantly blue livery, arguing that it could potentially pose a safety hazard for other aircraft as it was difficult for other crews to see the blue aircraft against a blue sky. To address the CAA's safety concerns, Air UK decided to amend its original colour scheme by opting for a hybrid blue-and-white scheme featuring a blue fuselage and a white tail.

Air UK's scheduled route network initially served the following 33 points: Aberdeen, Amsterdam, Basel, Belfast, Bergen, Birmingham, Blackpool, Bournemouth, Brussels, Dublin, Düsseldorf, Edinburgh, Exeter, Glasgow, Guernsey, Humberside, Isle of Man, Jersey, Leeds Bradford, Le Touquet, London Gatwick, London Heathrow, London Stansted, Manchester, Newcastle, Norwich, Ostend, Paris, Rotterdam, Southampton, Southend, Stavanger and Teesside.

Air UK was the first and, at the time, only scheduled airline in the UK to fly from all three main London airports.

Following British Airways' decision to retire its Vickers Viscount turboprop fleet and to withdraw from its loss-making regional scheduled routes, Air UK assumed BA's regional routes from Heathrow to Guernsey, Manchester to the Isle of Man, Leeds to Belfast and Dublin, and Edinburgh to Jersey in April 1980. Air UK's new, year-round Heathrow—Guernsey route was its most prominent scheduled route serving London's premier airport. (During the late 1970s, in the days prior to the construction of the M11, Air UK's predecessor Air Anglia had launched a year-round scheduled service linking Heathrow with the company's bases in Norwich and Humberside, as well as a year-round scheduled operation between London Gatwick and Leeds.)

=== Retrenchment ===
The severe recession of the early 1980s necessitated a major retrenchment, resulting in extensive frequency, route and staff cutbacks. This entailed the closure of bases at Bournemouth, Humberside and Stansted as well as a major reduction in operations at Southend. As a consequence of these cutbacks, ten turboprop aircraft (seven Heralds and three Bandeirantes) were withdrawn from service while the two Fokker F28 jets were leased out to French regional carrier Air Alsace. This in turn resulted in the closure of the former BIA engineering base at Blackpool, accounting for 220 out of a total of 400 job losses. It also resulted in the suspension of scheduled passenger and cargo services to 14 points by late 1981. At the start of the 1981–82 winter timetable in November 1981, Air UK relaunched scheduled operations from Stansted by opening a new route to Amsterdam. This was the first international scheduled service from London's third airport in over ten years. The resulting network linked 20 points in the British Isles and six in Europe. Management hoped that these business realignments – including cutting the company's workforce in half over a two-year period — would reverse heavy losses Air UK had incurred during its first two years of operation, thereby stabilising the company and positioning it for future growth.

=== Reorganisation and renewed expansion ===
In 1982, Peter Villa led a management buyout of Air UK's charter business, resulting in reconstituting BIA as a charter-only airline and his departure from Air UK along with the four BAC One-Eleven 400s. In addition to the tough economic climate and merger blues during the airline's inception as a result of combining two organisations with vastly different cultures and management styles, the operation of these aircraft had largely been responsible for Air UK's poor financial performance that threatened the airline's survival.

1982 was also the year the CAA transferred Air UK's Gatwick—Guernsey licence to Guernsey Airlines, a newly formed regional operator, following numerous passenger complaints about the service Air UK had been providing ever since it had assumed the former BIA operation on that route. That year also saw Air UK joining forces with British Midland to form Manx Airlines, a new, jointly owned regional subsidiary based on the Isle of Man. Air UK parent B&C owned 25% of Manx Airlines, making it the new joint venture's junior partner. (British Midland, which owned the remaining 75%, was the senior partner.) Air UK and British Midland hoped that transferring their loss-making Isle of Man operations to a dedicated, lower cost subsidiary would eventually make these services profitable.

In 1983, Air UK broke even for the first time. This was also the year the airline acquired its first Shorts 330 commuter turboprop plane, which it named Enterprise in a publicity stunt at Stansted Airport where the naming ceremony took place in the shadow of a Boeing 747 shuttle carrier aircraft used by NASA to launch Space Shuttle Enterprise.

By 1985, Air UK acquired additional Shorts 330/360s and Fokker F27s. The latter included the first stretched 500 series F27s featuring an increased seating capacity of 52 (as opposed to 44 for all shorter fuselage Fokker F27 models). To further support its ongoing expansion, Air UK temporarily leased an F-28 1000 series as well as two BIA One Eleven 400s during that period. (All of these aircraft wore different, white-based colour schemes.) Reintroduction of jet equipment enabled Air UK to assume British Caledonian's regional operation between Glasgow, Newcastle and Amsterdam at the start of the 1985 summer timetable period, thereby further strengthening its position as the UK's leading regional feeder operator at Amsterdam Schiphol and as the airport's largest foreign scheduled carrier. The additional aircraft also permitted several year-round, domestic and international scheduled services from Stansted to be reinstated.

In 1987, Air UK placed its first order for the British Aerospace 146 regional jetliner. The introduction of Air UK's first 146 200 series regional jet coincided with the introduction of a new livery, consisting of a white fuselage and tail with three different blue cheatlines merging into a stylised Union Flag on the aircraft's tail. In addition, this livery differed from the previous one by dropping the gap between the words "Air" and "UK" while inserting a gap between the letters "U" and "K" in "UK".

Following British Airways' takeover of British Caledonian in December 1987, the CAA awarded Air UK the licences for the ex-BCal domestic feeder routes from Gatwick to Glasgow and Edinburgh in 1988. This resulted in an order for four stretched BAe 146-300s to enable the launch of high-frequency services with up to seven daily round-trips on both routes from the start of the 1988–89 winter timetable period.

In 1992 The subsidiary Air UK Engineering Ltd. was officially registered. It started operations on April 1, 1992, dealing with BAe 146, F100, F27, Herald.

By 1994, Air UK acquired several, new Fokker 100 jet aircraft. The introduction of these aircraft led to the adoption of another new livery, the final Air UK-themed livery in the airline's 19-year history. This livery combined elements of the earlier livery with a new, single dark blue cheatline that included a thin, pale blue stripe merging into a dark blue tail featuring the previous Union Flag logo. It also combined elements of both previous liveries by dropping the gap between the "U" and "K" in "UK" (as in Air UK's original blue livery) as well as dropping the gap between the words "Air" and "UK" (as in the airline's second livery).

By 1995, Air UK had replaced all of the older, smaller F27 100/200/400/600 series aircraft in its fleet with additional, stretched F27-500s. (Air UK operated a total of 22 F27s of various marks throughout its existence, all of which it had acquired second-hand.)

By the late 1990s, a fleet of new Fokker 50 and ATR-72 turboprops replaced the aging F27-500s. During that period Air UK also retired all of its 146-200s as well as the 146-100s.

=== Air UK Leisure ===
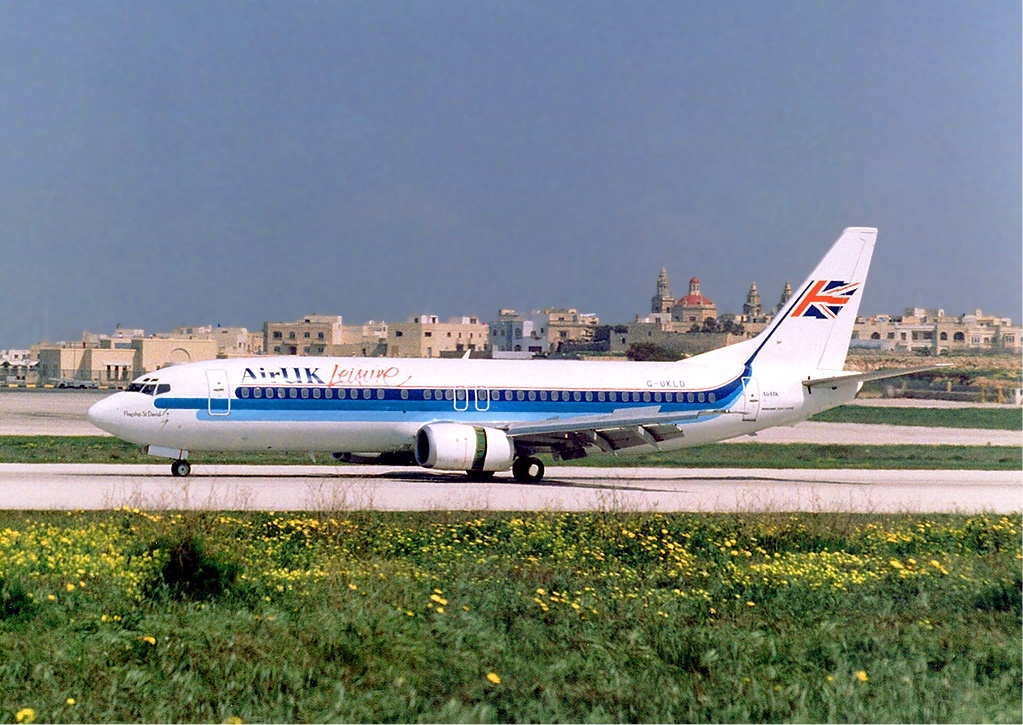
Air UK Leisure Boeing 737-400 at Malta Airport in the mid-1990s

In 1987, Air UK established Air UK Leisure as its new charter subsidiary in association with charter brokerage firm Viking International.

Air UK Leisure's corporate headquarters were located at Air UK's Stansted base. Its main operating bases were at London Gatwick, London Stansted and Manchester.

Operations commenced with three second-hand Boeing 737-200s. These were replaced with seven brand-new 737-400s, making Air UK Leisure first European operator of the 400 in October 1988.

In 1993, Air UK Leisure entered the long-haul leisure market through the acquisition of a pair of Boeing 767 300 ER series widebodied aircraft. Both aircraft were contracted by tour operator Unijet. Although Air UK Leisure operated these aircraft under the same Air Operator Certificate (AOC) as its 737 400 series narrow-bodied short-/medium-haul fleet, it adopted the Leisure International Airways brand for its long-haul operation.

Air UK Leisure was subsequently sold to Unijet, which in turn became part of the First Choice group.

=== Focusing on Stansted ===
Following the move to Stansted in 1988, Air UK became London's third airport's biggest resident airline and its main scheduled operator. The company began building a comprehensive network of short-haul domestic and European feeder routes that was intended to provide connecting traffic for the long-haul carriers that were then expected to commence operations from Stansted, as a result of the increasingly tight slot situation at both London Heathrow as well as London Gatwick, at the time London's two main gateway/hub airports, especially at peak times. Air UK's move to the new Norman Foster-designed terminal in early 1991 provided the impetus for the launch of several new, year-round scheduled routes linking Stansted with important business destinations including Belfast, Düsseldorf, Frankfurt, Hamburg, Inverness, Madrid, Milan Linate, Munich and Zürich (in addition to the existing year-round scheduled routes serving Aberdeen, Amsterdam, Brussels, the Channel Islands, Edinburgh, Glasgow and Paris). However, the unfavourable economic conditions in the UK at the time, i.e. the severe early 1990s recession and the fallout from the first Gulf War, resulted in a sharp contraction of both the business and leisure travel markets. This in turn resulted in the spectacular collapse of the International Leisure Group (ILG) and its Air Europe airline subsidiary, at the time the largest independent airline in the UK and Gatwick's biggest user, accounting for one-fifth of all the airport's slots. The then prevailing harsh economic climate also resulted in route and schedule cutbacks at other major airlines operating out of both main London airports. As a result, it became much easier to obtain viable slots at these airports, including at peak times. This meant that none of the contemporary major long-haul carriers were showing any interest in commencing operations at Stansted (with the sole exception of American Airlines, which ran a short-lived Stansted—Chicago service during the early 1990s). In addition, Stansted's considerably smaller catchment area and its greater distance from most parts of London compared with Heathrow and Gatwick, combined with poorer transport links in relation to Heathrow's and Gatwick's better accessibility, meant that Air UK found it extremely difficult to make its Stansted operation viable.

=== Rebranding ===
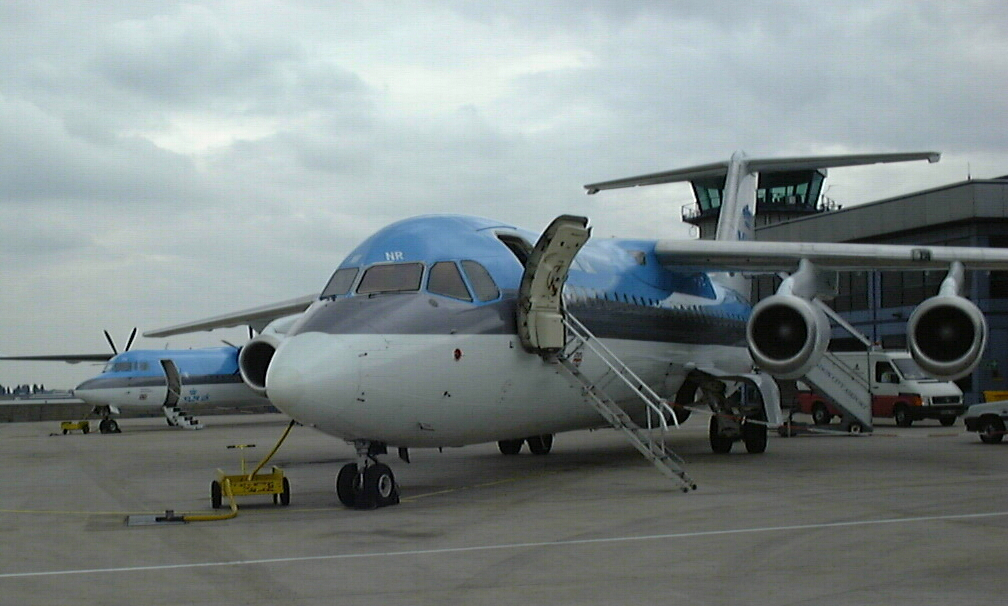
KLM UK British Aerospace 146 at London City Airport in 1999; a Fokker 50 is behind

In 1997, KLM became the sole owner of Air UK. This resulted in the airline being rebranded as KLM uk in January 1998, including the adoption of a new livery.

Initially, the rebranded airline launched new routes from London City serving KLM's Amsterdam Schiphol hub as well as Glasgow and Edinburgh. However, from January 2000, the KLM uk routes that did not serve Amsterdam were either progressively transferred to Buzz, the KLM group's new low-cost carrier, along with the remaining 146-300 aircraft or closed. KLM uk adopted this new strategy in response to its increasing inability to match the far lower costs of the rapidly growing "no frills" competition on the main London—Scotland trunk routes, especially Luton-based EasyJet and former British Airways subsidiary Go based at Stansted itself. By 2001, Buzz operated 14 point-to-point routes from Stansted. Many of these were former Air UK routes served with a fleet of eight BAe 146-300s handed down from Air UK and two independently sourced, second-hand Boeing 737-300s. In addition, scheduled routes not transferred to Buzz and serving destinations other than Amsterdam were eventually all withdrawn, thus reducing the network to only 15 routes exclusively linking regional UK airports to Amsterdam Schiphol. This also resulted in the retirement of KLM uk's ATR-72s.

In 2002, KLM decided to integrate what was left of KLM UK into KLM Cityhopper, its wholly owned, Dutch-based regional subsidiary. It also decided to sell Buzz to Ryanair the following year. This transaction constituted the final link in a long chain of events connecting the early- to mid-20th century decision of British & Commonwealth Shipping, a shipping company that could trace its roots to the 19th century, to diversify into commercial aviation through ownership of several of the post-/pre-war independent airlines that merged to form British United Airways, the UK's dominant private sector airline conglomerate of the 1960s, with what is arguably the world's most commercially successful airline of the first decade of the 21st century.

=== Further developments ===
By late 2009, several regional point-to-point routes plied by Air UK and its predecessors for many years, which were dropped soon after Dutch flag carrier KLM had become the airline's sole owner, had been taken over by Eastern Airways and Flybe, with the former concentrating on the ex-Air Anglia oil-related business routes along Britain's East Coast and the latter focusing on former BIA/Air Westward routes serving the southern and western parts of the UK.

== Incidents and accidents ==
There were four recorded non-fatal incidents during Air UK's 19-year existence from 1980 until 1998.

- On 11 June 1984, an empty ex-BIA Handley Page Dart Herald (registration: G-BBXI), was parked at Bournemouth Airport when a lorry struck the aircraft and damaged it beyond repair.
- On 19 July 1990, an ex-Air Anglia F-27-200 (registration G-BCDO) had an accident while landing at Amsterdam Schiphol Airport at the end of a scheduled flight from London Stansted. The aircraft's right-hand main gear failed to lock down while preparing to land. This resulted in a forced landing with the right gear retracted, damaging the aircraft beyond repair. There were no injuries among the 17 passengers and four crew members. (The aircraft was subsequently ferried to Air UK's base at Norwich Airport, where it was withdrawn from service and scrapped.)
- On 31 March 1992, a BAe 146-300 G-UKHP overran runway 34 at Aberdeen (Dyce) Airport after landing on a wet runway with high crosswinds. The pilot failed to deploy the spoilers and ran off the end of the runway. The aircraft was not badly damaged and no passengers were hurt.
- On 7 December 1997, an F-27-500F (registration: G-BNCY) had an accident at Guernsey Airport at the end of a scheduled service from Southampton. The aircraft overran the runway while landing in high crosswinds and came to rest in an adjacent field with its left landing gear collapsed. There were no injuries among the 50 passengers and four crew. (The aircraft was damaged beyond repair and subsequently written off.)

== Notes ==
Notes

Citations
