= KLM UK =

Regional airline of the United Kingdom (1998–2003)

KLM Cityhopper UK

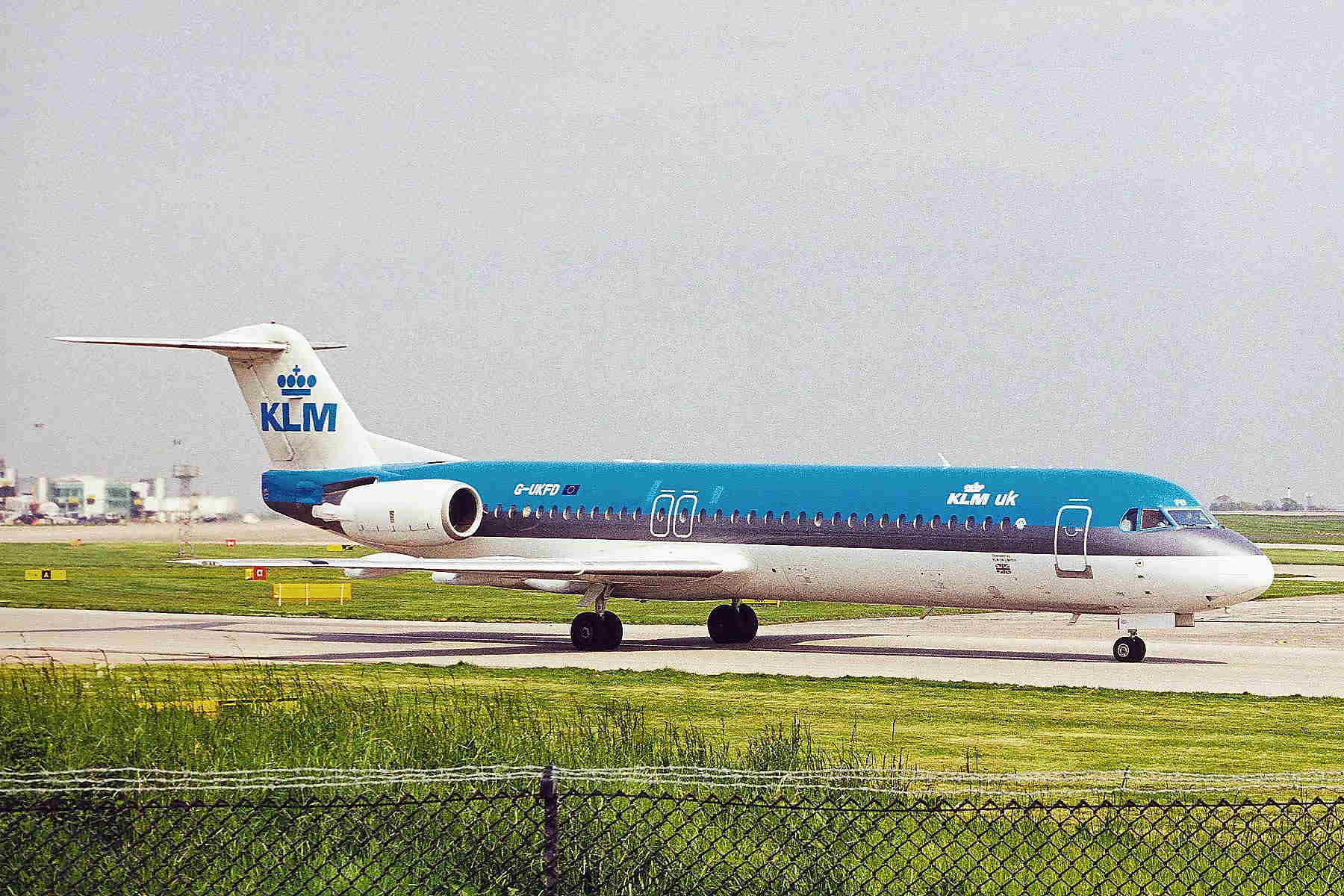
- Fokker 100
IATA	ICAO	Call sign
UK	UKA	UKAY
- Commenced operations: 1 January 1998 (as KLM UK); 1 November 2002 (as KLM Cityhopper UK)
- Ceased operations: 2002 (as KLM UK); 30 March 2003 (merged into Dutch-based KLM Cityhopper N.V.)
- Operating bases: Amsterdam Airport Schiphol
- Frequent-flyer program: Flying Dutchman
- Parent company: KLM (1998–2003)
- Headquarters: London Stansted Airport, Essex, England
- Website: KLM UK

KLM UK Ltd. - styled as KLM uk - was a British regional airline subsidiary of the Dutch airline KLM. It operated services within the UK and between the UK and the Netherlands with a fleet of ATR 72, Fokker 50 and Fokker 100 aircraft. KLM UK had its headquarters in the Stansted House of London Stansted Airport. It was formed as a result of KLM's takeover of AirUK.

== History ==
When Air UK began to significantly increase its presence at Amsterdam’s Schiphol airport towards the end of the 1980s, it was inevitable that Dutch flag carrier KLM would show an interest. This was initially materialized into the acquisition of a 14.9% holding in the British carrier (in 1987), raised to 45% later on. Eventually, in July 1997, KLM bought out the remaining shares making Air UK a wholly owned subsidiary. The two airline’s marketing departments had already integrated in April 1996 and as of January 1, 1998, the airline’s trading name was changed to KLM uk.

KLM uk was the largest foreign user of Schiphol with over 750 movements each week, carrying around 2m passengers annually. London-Stansted operations under the new title commenced on January 16, 1998, with a mixed fleet of BAe 146 and Fokker equipment serving 14 domestic and 9 European destinations. In December of that same year, deliveries of four ATR-72 aircraft commenced, to replace the Fokker 50 equipment. Flights from London-City were code-shared with Cityjet. At its peak, in 1998, KLM uk carried 4.8m passengers network-wide and was the UK’s third largest carrier.

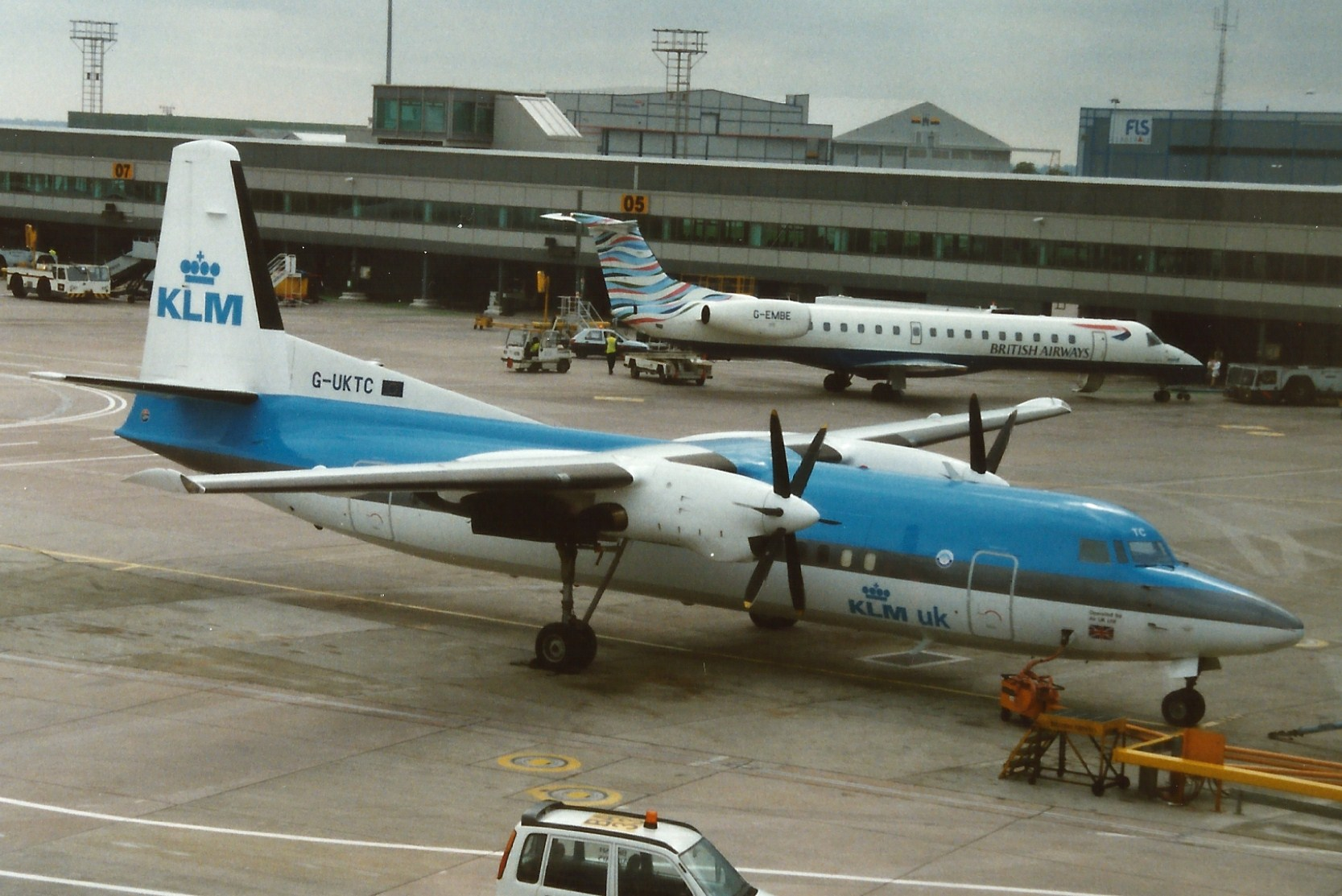
Fokker 50

In late 1999 the air carrier began to concentrate on services from 15 key UK regional airports into Amsterdam. Six international and domestic routes had been dropped by the spring of 2000, including all services to the Channel Islands, thus rendering the small ATR-72 fleet surplus to requirements. Internal reorganisation led to the amalgamation of KLM uk with Dutch KLM Cityhopper to form KLM Cityhopper UK Ltd. as of November 1, 2002. Thereafter, further rationalisation led to the last vestiges of the old Air UK being eliminated with yet another change of name to KLM Cityhopper N.V. on March 30, 2003, and the progressive transfer of the fleet to Dutch registry.

== Flights ==
KLM UK flew domestically and between the United Kingdom and Continental Europe.

== Fleet ==
KLM uk operated these aircraft types during its life:

- ATR 72-200
- Boeing 737-400
- British Aerospace 146-100
- British Aerospace 146-300
- Fokker F27-200
- Fokker F27-500
- Fokker F27-500F
- Fokker 50
- Fokker 100

== Subsidiaries ==
KLM UK Engineering operated as an MRO within Norwich, servicing mainly narrow body aircraft such as the Boeing 737. The technical college was responsible for the training of apprentices.
