= Autosomal dominant porencephaly type I =

- Other names: Infantile hemiplegia with porencephaly, Porencephaly type 1
- The autosomal dominant pattern of inheritance seen in this form of porencephaly

Autosomal dominant porencephaly type I is a rare type of porencephaly that causes cysts to grow on the brain and damage to small blood vessels, which can lead to cognitive impairment, migraines, seizures, and hemiplegia or hemiparesis.

== Signs and symptoms ==
Different people are affected very differently by this disease. The main manifestation is fluid-filled cysts that grow on the brain and can cause damage that varies depending on their location and severity. Symptoms may manifest early in infancy, or may manifest as late as adulthood. Symptoms associated with autosomal dominant porencephaly type I include migraines, hemiplegia or hemiparesis, seizures, cognitive impairment, strokes, dystonia, speech disorders, involuntary muscle spasms, visual field defects, and hydrocephalus.

== Genetics ==
Autosomal dominant porencephaly type I is caused by mutations in a gene called COL4A1, located at 13q34 (band 34 on the long arm of chromosome 13). These mutations are inherited in an autosomal dominant pattern. COL4A1 codes for a form of collagen, collagen type IV, which is an important element in the construction of the vascular basement membrane. When collagen type IV is not functioning properly, the basement membrane is weak and the blood vessel is susceptible to damage from trauma or may burst. Damaged blood vessels in the skull or brain cause cysts to form.

== Diagnosis ==
Though it is only definitively diagnosed by a genetic test, autosomal dominant porencephaly type I can be suspected if the disease is known to run in the family or if someone shows symptoms. CT scanning or MRI may be useful in indicating a diagnosis. COL4A1 may be mutated in other diseases that need to be distinguished, including brain small vessel disease with hemorrhage and HANAC syndrome. CADASIL syndrome is caused by a mutation in a different gene, but may cause similar symptoms. Sporadic porencephaly is another disorder that can appear similar.

== Treatment ==
Treatment for autosomal dominant porencephaly type I is based on the symptoms that an individual is experiencing - for example, treatment of seizures with anticonvulsants. It is particularly important for individuals with this disorder and hypertension to control their blood pressure, as they are at higher risk of stroke. Other stroke prevention treatments include avoiding anticoagulants, smoking, and situations that may lead to head trauma.

== Epidemiology ==
Autosomal dominant porencephaly type I is rare and its prevalence and incidence are unknown. It affects males and females equally.
