= EMX =

EMX or EmX may refer to:

- emx+gcc, a DOS extender and DOS and OS/2 programming environment
- Emx (underground car)
- Emerald Express (EmX), a bus rapid transit system in Lane County, Oregon
- EuroManx, a defunct airline which held ICAO airline designator EMX
- El Maitén Airport, an airport in Argentina which has IATA airport code EMX
- Electribe EMX, music production station by Korg

== See also ==
- EMX1, a human gene
- EMX2, a human gene
