= EMX homeogene =

Gene family

The Emx gene family has two members: EMX1 and EMX2. The Emx genes are responsible for encoding these two transcription factors; the homeodomain is responsible for binding to target DNA sequences to regulate transcription.
