= Emerald Air =

Emerald Air can refer to one of the following airlines:

- Emerald Air (United States), a defunct United States airline
- Emerald Airways, a defunct British airline
- Emerald Airlines, an active Irish airline
