= YANK1 =

Protein-coding gene in the species Homo sapiens

STK32A

Identifiers
- Aliases: STK32A, YANK1, serine/threonine kinase 32A
- External IDs: MGI: 2442403; GeneCards: STK32A
Available structures
PDB	Ortholog search: PDBe RCSB
PDB	List of PDB id codes 4FR4
Enzyme activity
EC #	BRENDA	ExPASy	KEGG	MetaCyc
2.7.11.1	↗	↗	↗	↗

Gene location (Human)
Chr.	Chromosome 5 (human)
Band	5q32	Start	147,234,963 bp
Band	5q32	End	147,387,855 bp

Gene location (Mouse)
Chr.	Chromosome 18 (mouse)
Band	18|18 B3	Start	43,340,648 bp
Band	18|18 B3	End	43,451,747 bp
RNA expression pattern
Bgee	Human / Mouse (ortholog); Top expressed in: sural nerve; right adrenal cortex; left adrenal cortex; hypothalamus; testicle; substantia nigra; tibia; Descending thoracic aorta; right hemisphere of cerebellum; ascending aorta / Top expressed in: supraoptic nucleus; olfactory tubercle; external carotid artery; suprachiasmatic nucleus; arcuate nucleus; internal carotid artery; paraventricular nucleus of hypothalamus; globus pallidus; ventromedial nucleus; soleus muscle; More reference expression data
BioGPS	n/a
Gene ontology
Molecular function	transferase activity; nucleotide binding; protein kinase activity; protein serine/threonine kinase activity; ATP binding; metal ion binding; kinase activity
Cellular component	plasma membrane; intracellular anatomical structure; membrane
Biological process	protein phosphorylation; intracellular signal transduction; peptidyl-serine phosphorylation; phosphorylation
Sources:Amigo / QuickGO
Orthologs
Databases	NCBI: entry; OMA: entry
Species	Human	Mouse
Entrez	202374	269019
Ensembl	ENSG00000169302	ENSMUSG00000039954
UniProt	Q8WU08	Q8BGW6
RefSeq (mRNA)	NM_001112724; NM_001287740; NM_145001	NM_178749
RefSeq (protein)	NP_001106195; NP_001274669; NP_659438	NP_848864
Location (UCSC)	Chr 5: 147.23 – 147.39 Mb	Chr 18: 43.34 – 43.45 Mb
PubMed search
- Wikidata
View/Edit Human	View/Edit Mouse

YANK1, also known as serine/threonine-protein kinase 32A (STK32A), is a protein kinase that in humans is encoded by the STK32A gene. YANK1 belongs to the yet another novel kinase (YANK) family, which includes YANK1 (serine/threonine kinase 32A), YANK2 (serine/threonine kinase 32B), and YANK3 (serine/threonine kinase 32C). YANK1 currently does not have any identified substrates. YANK1 is known to interact with EMX2, where it regulates the orientation of stereociliary bundles in hair cells of the inner ear by interacting with the PCP signaling pathway.
