= Janes Aviation =

British cargo airline

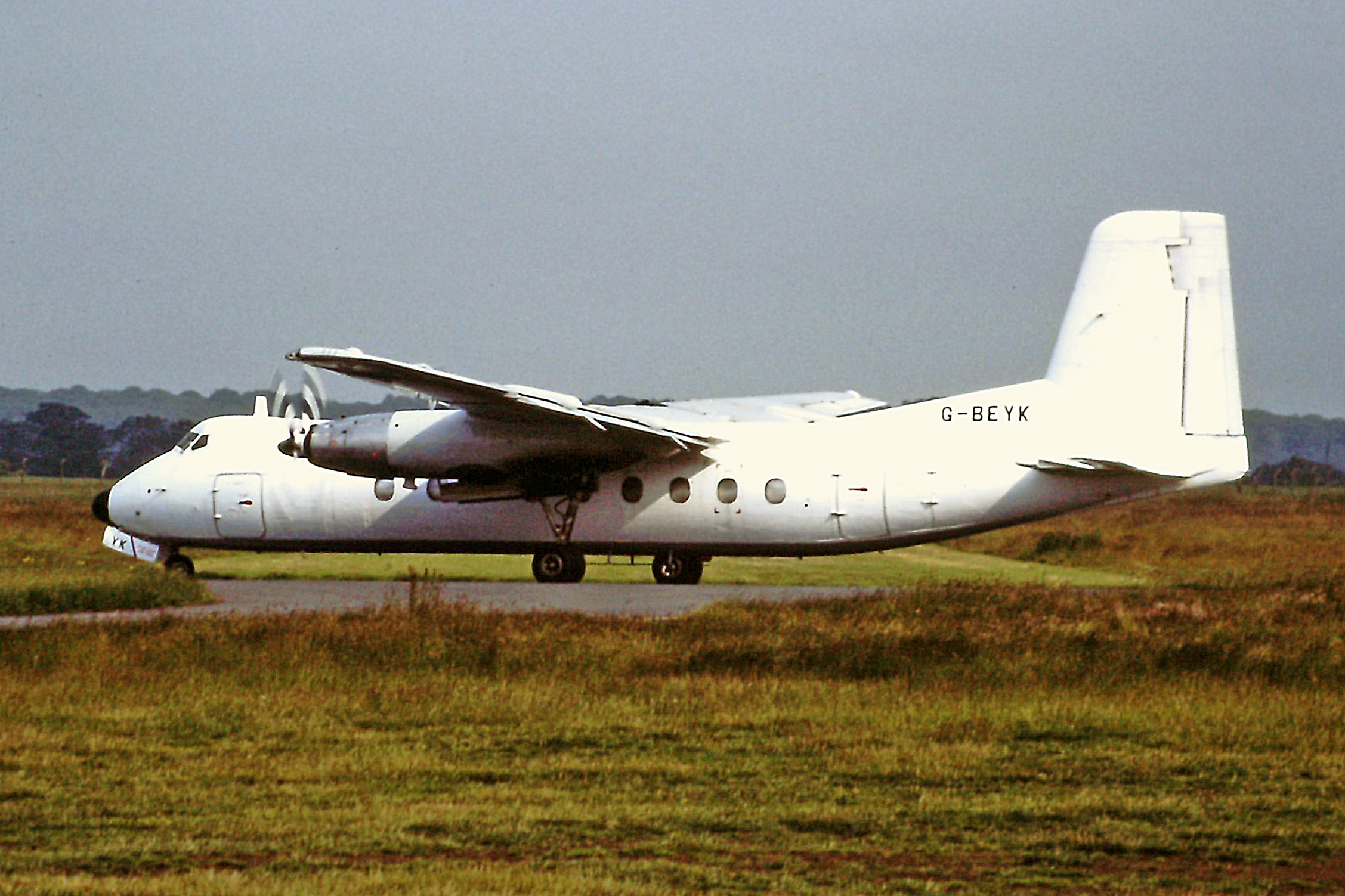
- Dart Herald
IATA	ICAO	Call sign
—	JAN	JANES
- Founded: 1987
- Commenced operations: December 1987
- Ceased operations: 1992 (changed name to Emerald Airways)
- Hubs: London Southend Airport
- Headquarters: Benfleet, United Kingdom
- Key people: Andy Janes; Hilary Janes

Janes Aviation was a British cargo airline based at London Southend Airport.

== History ==
In December 1987 Andy Janes and his wife Hilary started operations of Janes Aviation Ltd. as a cargo airline based at Southend Airport. The airline operated a mixed fleet of BAe.748, Douglas DC-3, Dart Herald, and Short 330 aircraft. The airline held a United Kingdom Civil Aviation Authority Type A Operating Licence, permitting it to carry passengers, cargo and mail on aircraft with 20 or more seats.

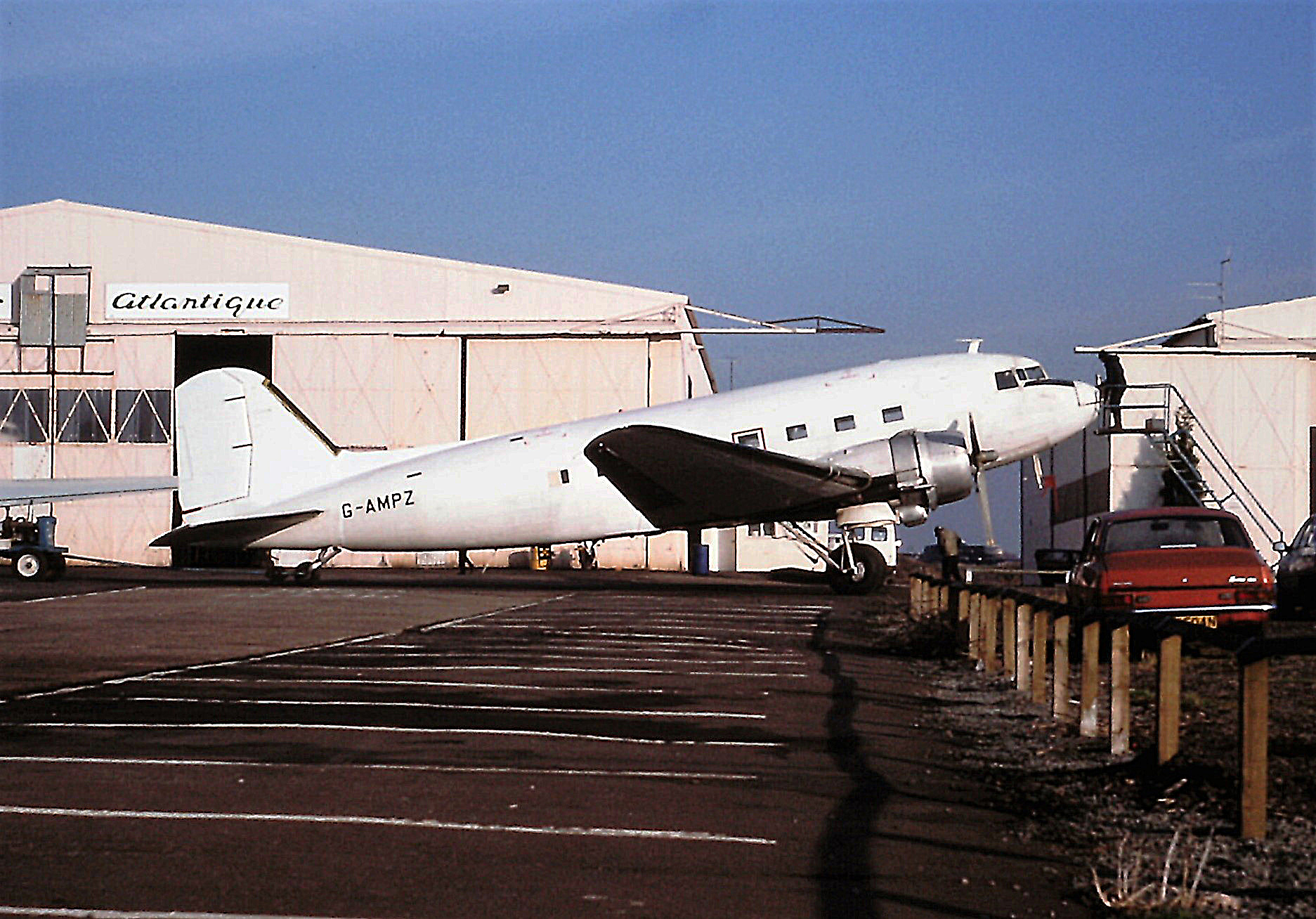
Douglas DC-3

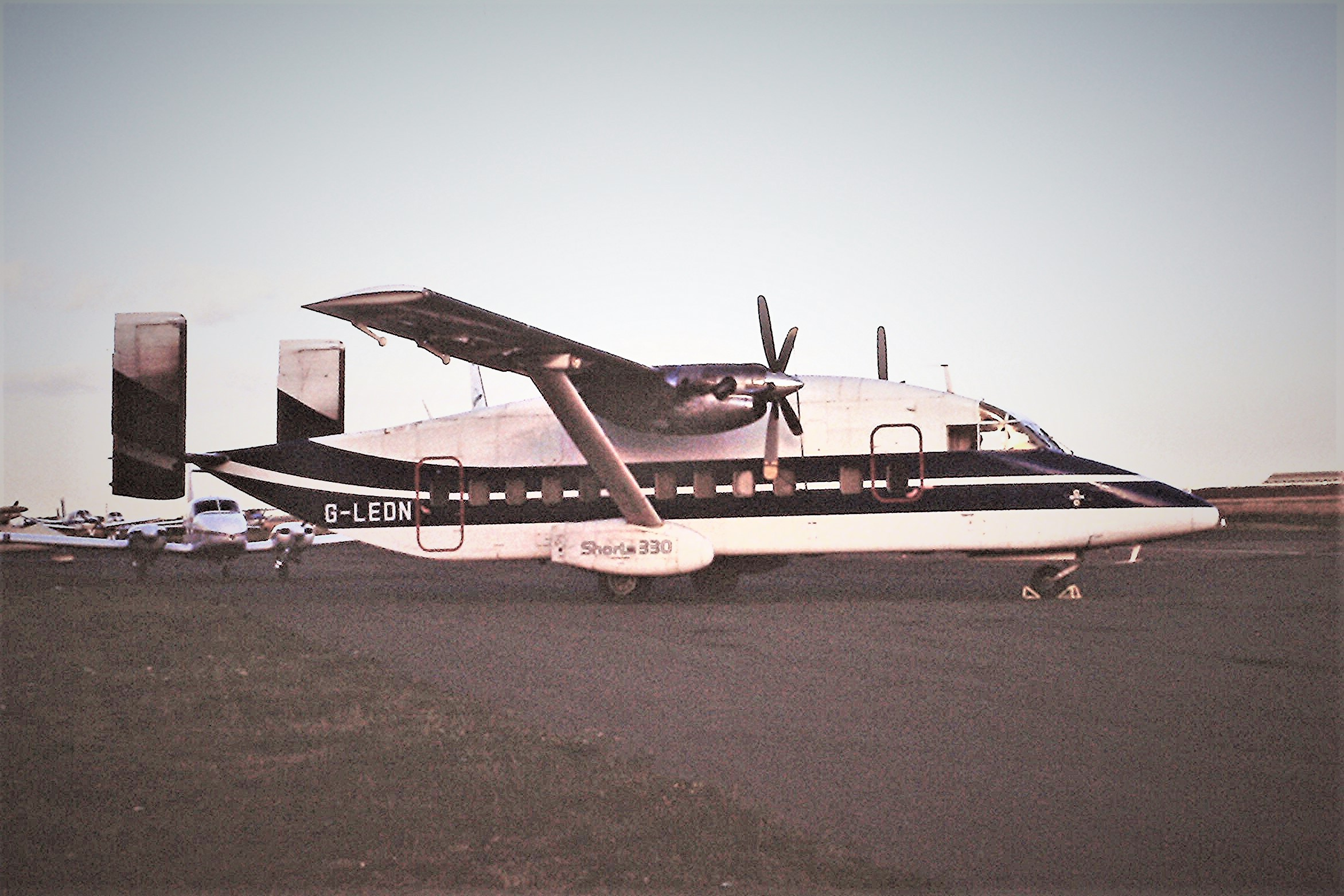
Short 330

Operations commenced in the same month with a leased BN Islander flyingg between Blackpool and Belfast City under contract to Lynx Express. The need for greater capacity led to the acquisition of two Douglas DC-3 freighters in 1988, the first of which entered service on 26 July. With their new equipment, Janes additionally flew charters for the Ford Motor Company between Cardiff, Cologne and Valencia, periodic Manchester-Dublin newspaper flights and Christmas mail from Belfast to Gatwick. Fleet reliability was improved by the addition of its own Short 330 turbo-prop early in 1989. A BN Trislander was also purchased to provide for small loads up to 1500 kg. A major increase in uplift capability came about late in 1990, when the first of two HP Dart Herald freighters arrived to take over nightly services from Coventry, including new contracts to carry car parts to Ostend and weekend newspapers between Glasgow and Southend.

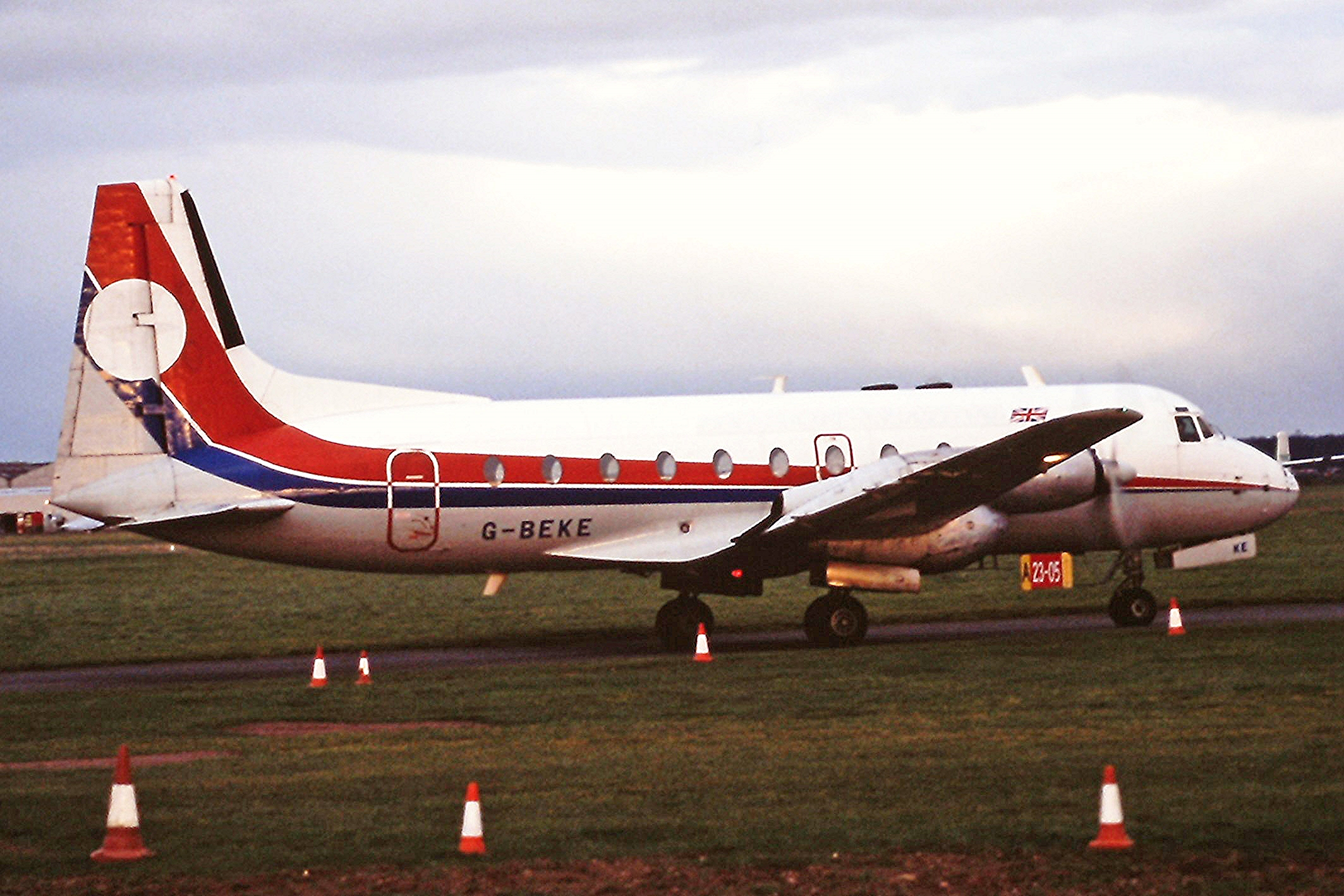
Hawker Siddeley 748 still in basic Dan-Air colors

The beginning of transformation into a major freight operator began in November 1991 with the arrival of the first Hawker Siddeley 748, followed by purchase of the entire remaining Dan-Air fleet of six such aircraft in July 1992, together with a large spares inventory. With a more commercially viable fleet, the air carrier was able to secure regular contracts with the Royal Mail and Parcelforce linking East Midlands-Belfast and Coventry-Glasgow respectively. In mid-1992 the company was renamed Emerald Airways.

== See also ==
- List of defunct airlines of the United Kingdom
