= Schizencephaly =

Brain malformation; large clefts in the cerebrum

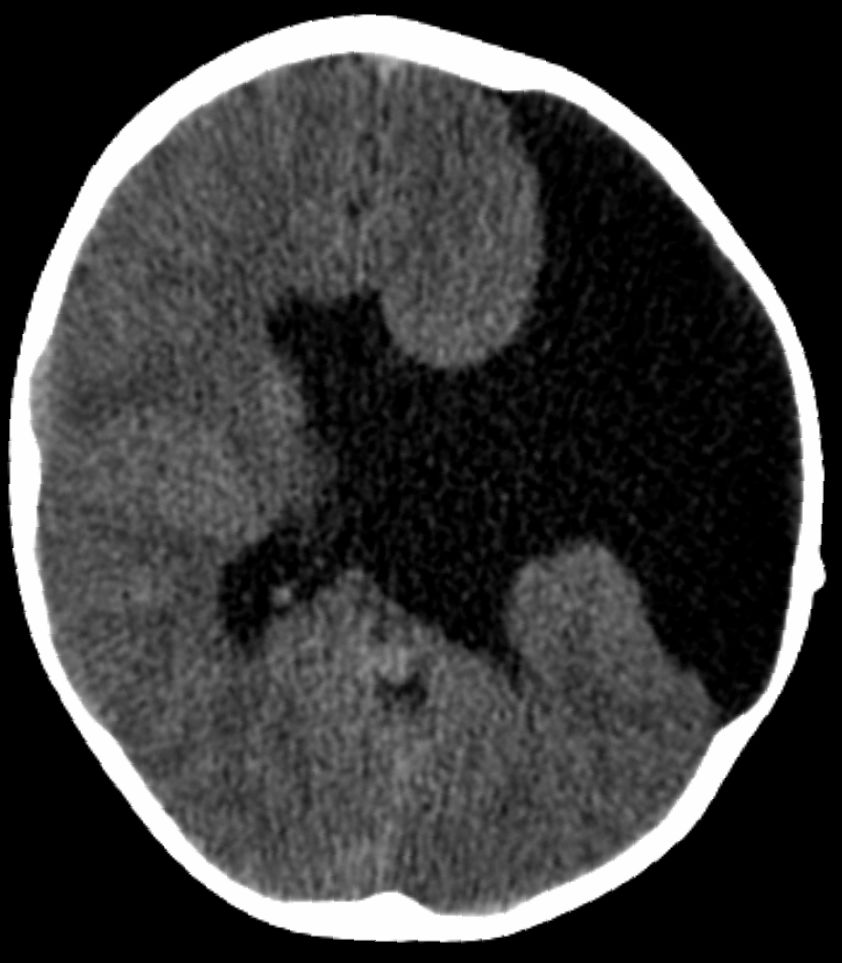
- Axial CT scan showing schizencephaly in a 6-year-old child
- Specialty: Medical genetics, neurology

Schizencephaly (from Greek skhizein 'to split' and enkephalos 'brain') is a rare birth defect of the brain, characterized by abnormal clefts lined with grey matter that form the ependyma of the cerebral ventricles to the pia mater. These clefts can occur bilaterally or unilaterally. Common clinical features of this malformation include epilepsy, motor deficits, and psychomotor retardation.

== Presentation ==
Schizencephaly can be distinguished from porencephaly by the fact that in schizencephaly, the fluid-filled component is entirely lined by heterotopic grey matter, while a porencephalic cyst is lined mostly by white matter. Individuals with clefts in both hemispheres, or bilateral clefts, are often developmentally delayed and have delayed speech and language skills and corticospinal dysfunction. Individuals with smaller, unilateral clefts (clefts in one hemisphere) may be weak or paralyzed on one side of the body and may have average or near-average intelligence. Patients with schizencephaly may also have varying degrees of microcephaly, Cognitive impairment, hemiparesis (weakness or paralysis affecting one side of the body), or quadriparesis (weakness or paralysis affecting all four extremities), and may have reduced muscle tone (hypotonia). Most patients have seizures, and some may have hydrocephalus.

== Causes ==
In schizencephaly, the neurons border the edge of the cleft, implying a very early disruption of the usual grey matter migration during embryogenesis. The cause of the disruption is not known; however it is likely the cause may be either a genetic mutation or a physical insult, such as an infection, an infarction, hemorrhaging, a stroke while in utero, or exposure to a toxin. Schizencephaly may also be caused by infection during pregnancy, such as Cytomegalovirus.

It is thought that normal neuron migration, during the second trimester of intrauterine development, is when primitive neuron precursors (germinal matrix) migrate from just beneath the ventricular ependyma to the peripheral hemispheres where they form the cortical grey matter. Often, with schizencephaly, there are additional associated heterotopias (isolated islands of neurons) which indicate a failure of migration of the neurons to their final position in the brain, possibly caused by a stroke.

=== Genetic cause ===
There was once thought to be a genetic association with the EMX2 gene, although this theory has recently lost support. However it has been confirmed that mutations in the COL4A1 gene occur in some patients with schizencephaly.

== Diagnosis ==
- Radiological methods like computed tomography (CT) and/or magnetic resonance imaging (MRI) - unilateral or bilateral clefting of the brain.
- Genetic testing for confirmation of mutations in the genes associated with susceptibility to the condition.

== Treatment ==
Treatment for individuals with schizencephaly generally consists of physical therapy (KG-ZNS with Vojta Methode), occupational therapy (with specific emphasis on neuro-developmental therapy techniques), treatment for seizures, and, in cases that are complicated by hydrocephalus, a shunt.

== Prognosis ==
The prognosis for individuals with schizencephaly varies depending on the size of the clefts and the degree of neurological deficit.

== Frequency ==
In some cases, the defect is linked to mutations of the EMX2, SIX3, and Collagen, type IV, alpha 1 genes. Because having a sibling with schizencephaly has been statistically shown to increase risk of the disorder, it is possible that there is a heritable genetic component to the disease.
