= Emerald Airways =

British airline, 1992–2006

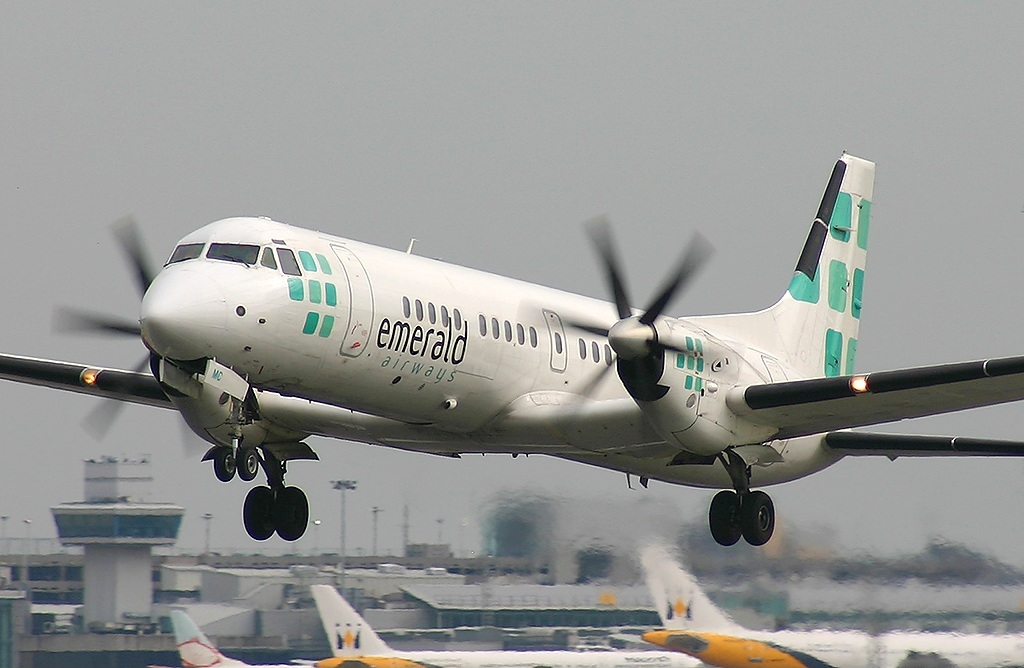
- BAe ATP
IATA	ICAO	Call sign
G3	JEM	GEMSTONE
- Founded: 1987 (as Janes Aviation)
- Ceased operations: 2006 (as Emerald Airways)
- Operating bases: Liverpool; Isle of Man; Coventry; Pisa; Prague; Vienna; Paris
- Fleet size: 31
- Headquarters: Liverpool Airport, United Kingdom
- Website: www.flyjem.com

Emerald Airways was an airline based in Liverpool, United Kingdom. It operated contract and ad hoc freight services throughout the UK and Europe for postal, newspaper and freight companies and passenger services to Ireland. The brand FlyJem labelled passenger scheduled operations from 5 May 2004 till 12 Jun 2005. The airline ceased operations on 12 May 2006.

== History ==
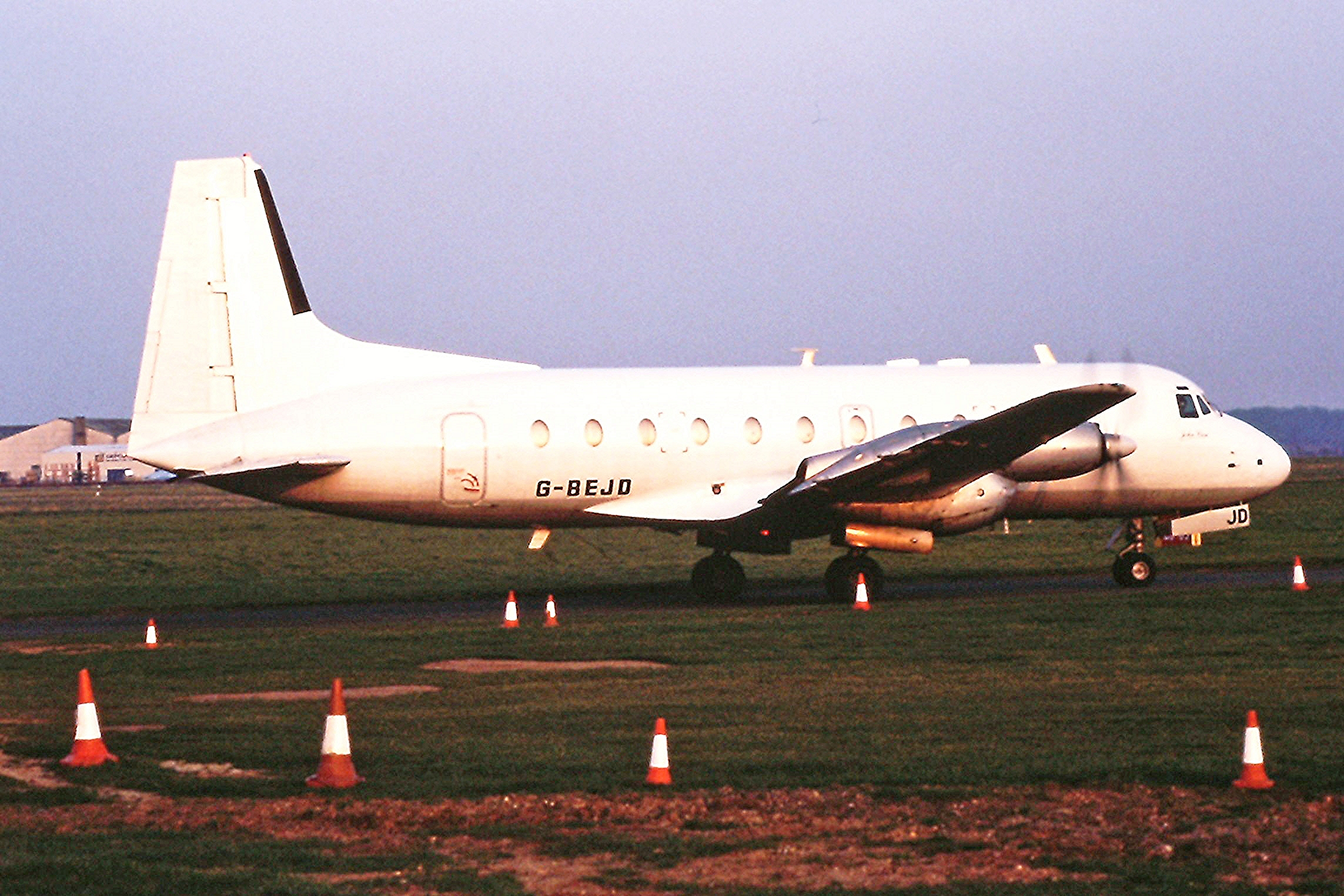
Janes Aviation Hawker Siddeley HS 748

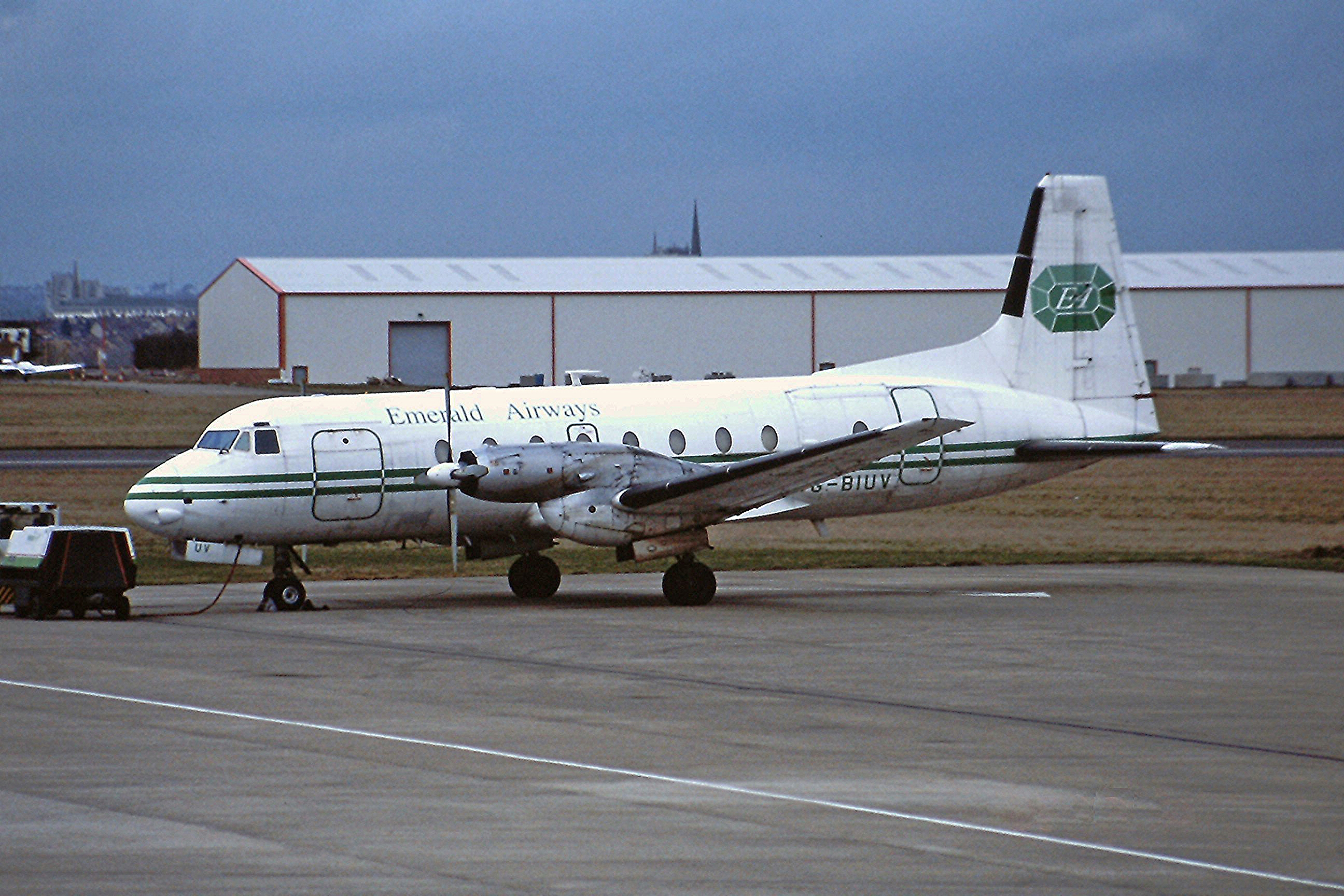
Hawker Siddeley HS 748 at Coventry on 8 February 2003

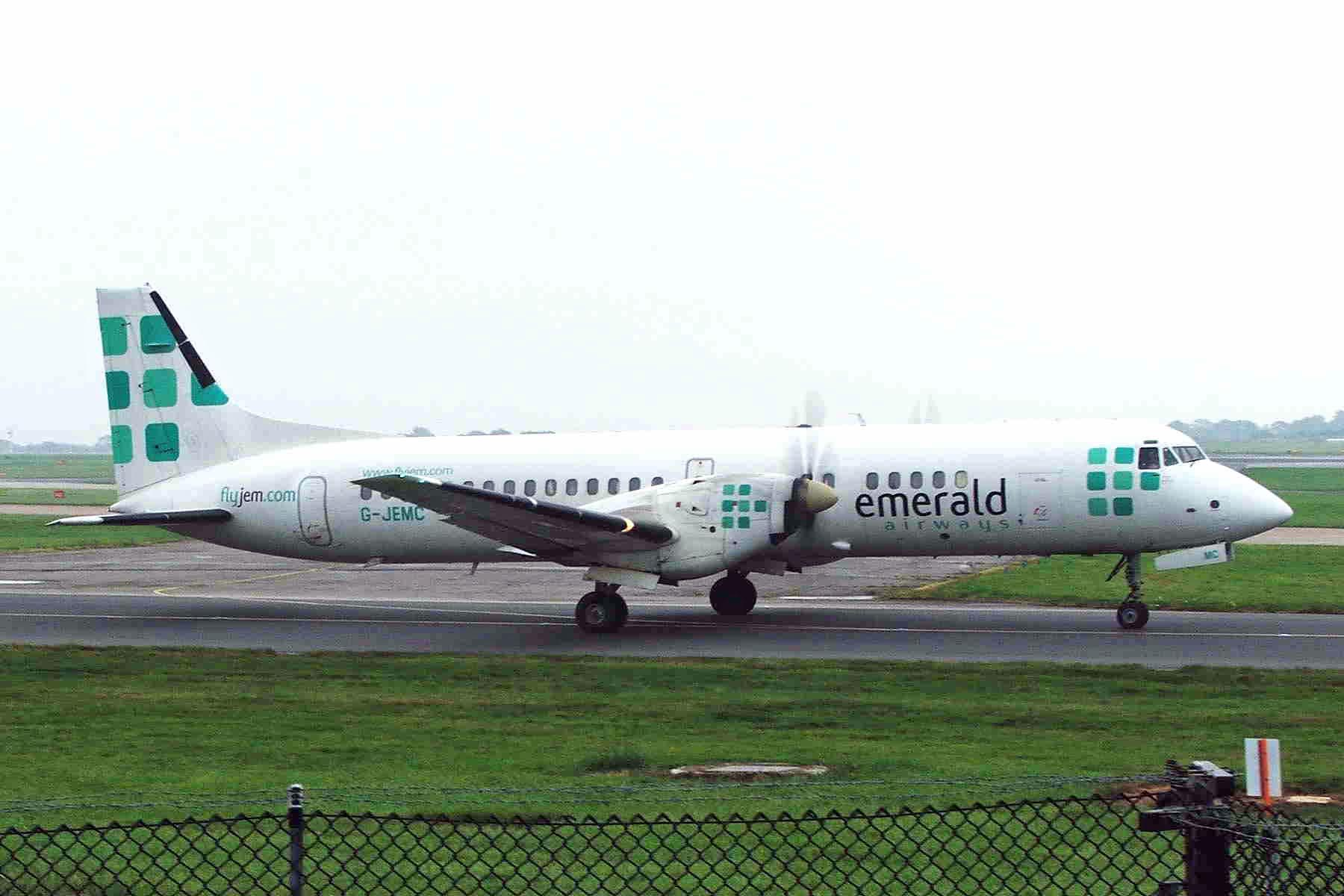
BAe ATP

The airline was established in November 1987 and started operations one month later. It was formed by Andy Janes and his wife Hilary as Janes Aviation at Southend airport. The company was renamed Emerald Airways Ltd. in mid-1992, in recognition of the large amount of business across the Irish Sea and established its base in Liverpool. In 2002, Emerald bought Exeter based Streamline Aviation which was fully absorbed in the summer of the following year. The airline was wholly owned by AS Janes and HJ Janes. In April 1995 the first passenger scheduled operations were started but came to an end four years later.

In May 2004 passenger schedules were restarted - low-cost services from Liverpool John Lennon Airport to the Isle of Man, using BAe ATPs - but in June 2005, EuroManx successfully bought them. Following the takeover these services were then operated under the EuroManx name and booking system, but often the cabin crew employed and the planes used were those of Emerald Airways.

On 4 May 2006 at 20:00 the airline's Air Operators Certificate was suspended by the CAA following safety issues, the latest of which was an HS748 incident in the Channel Islands. The CAA specified that should its requirements be met the airline's AOC would be reinstated. On 11 May 2006, administrators were appointed. As a result of the fleet grounding the firm was unable to generate any money to run the business. Following the suspension of AOC and the company subsequently calling in administrators, one of the ATPs was impounded by the Isle of Man Government at Ronaldsway Airport. The AOC was revoked at the request of Emerald Airways on 7 August 2006.

== Hubs ==
Emerald Airways' main base was Liverpool John Lennon Airport and it had hubs at Coventry Airport, Galileo Galilei Airport (PSA), Ruzyně International Airport, Vienna International Airport, Charles de Gaulle Airport and Marseille Provence Airport.

== Fleet ==
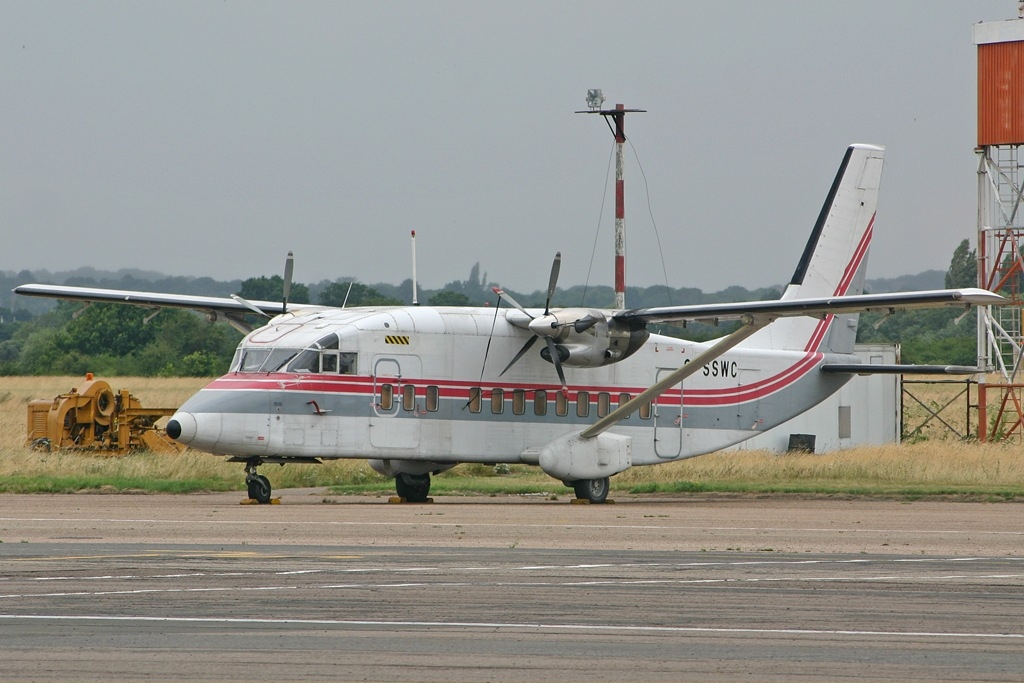
Shorts 360 at Southend airport

The fleet included the following aircraft (at August 2006):

- 15 x Hawker Siddeley HS 748
- 5 x BAe ATP
- 1 x Shorts 330
- 10 x Shorts 360

== See also ==
- List of defunct airlines of the United Kingdom
