= EuroManx =

Airline from the Isle of Man

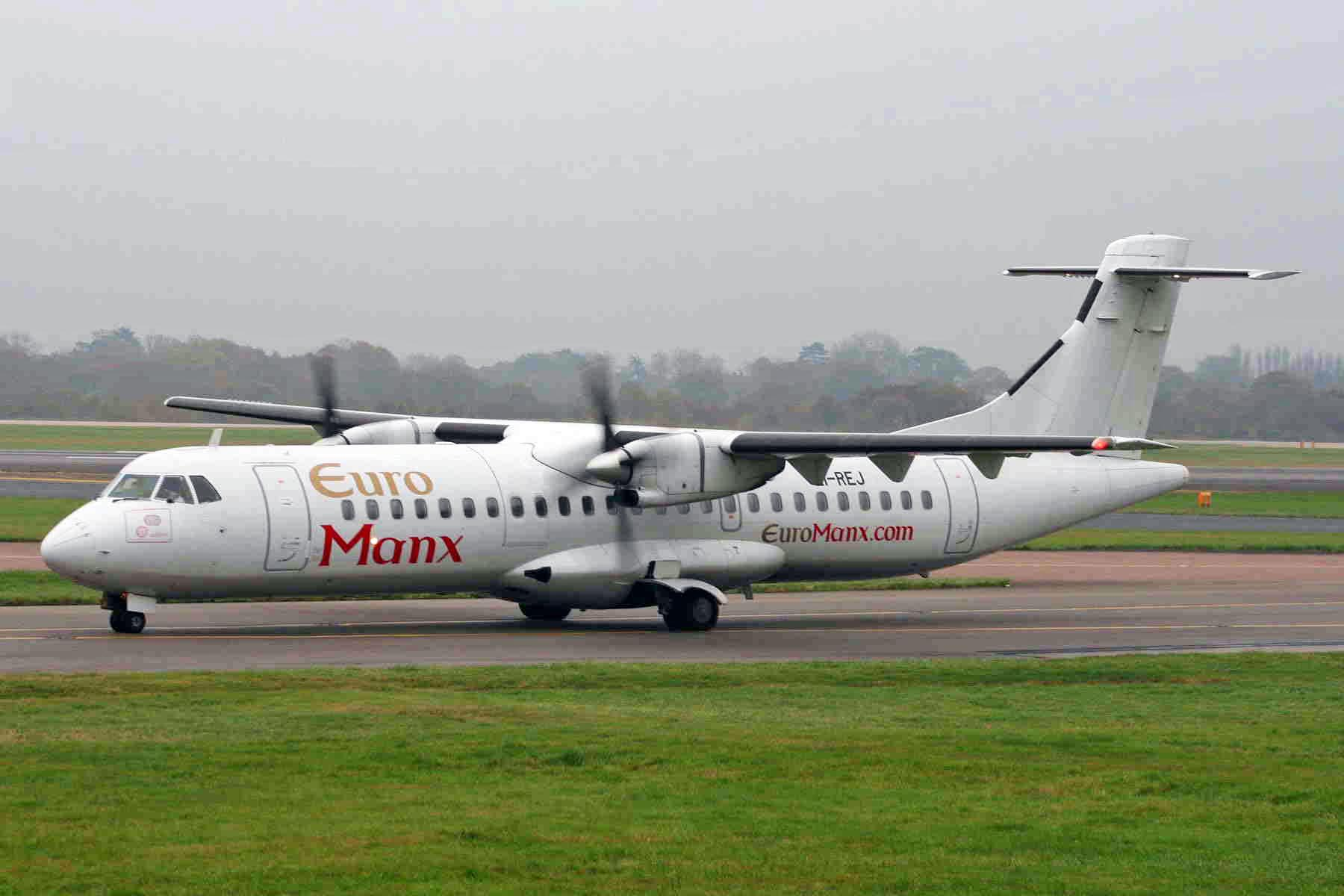
- ATR 72-201
| IATA | ICAO | Call sign |
|---|---|---|
| 3W | EMX | EUROMANX |
- Founded: 2002
- Commenced operations: August 2002
- Ceased operations: May 2008
- Hubs: Ronaldsway Airport
- Frequent-flyer program: Euroclub
- Fleet size: 3 (at time of closure)
- Headquarters: Ronaldsway Airport
- Key people: John Seymour
- Website: http://www.euromanx.com/

EuroManx Ltd. was a Manx airline based at Ronaldsway Airport, which operated scheduled domestic passenger services as well as business charters. On 9 May 2008 the airline announced that it was ceasing all operations, citing rising fuel prices and reduced passenger numbers as the reasons.

== History ==
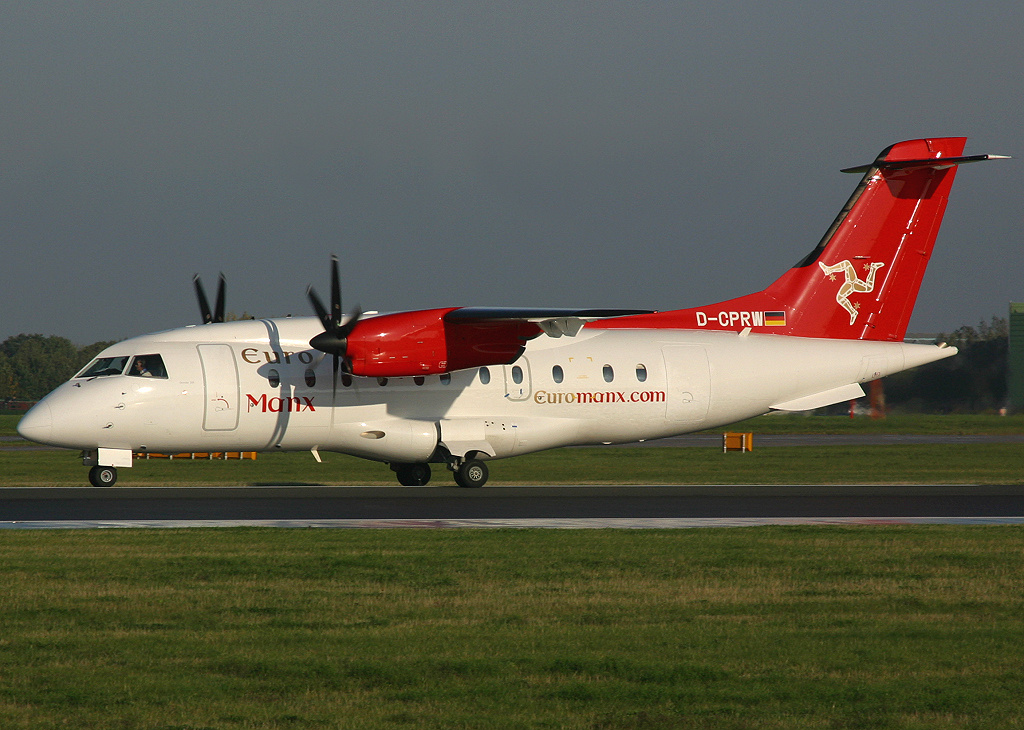
Dornier 328 at Manchester Airport,2005

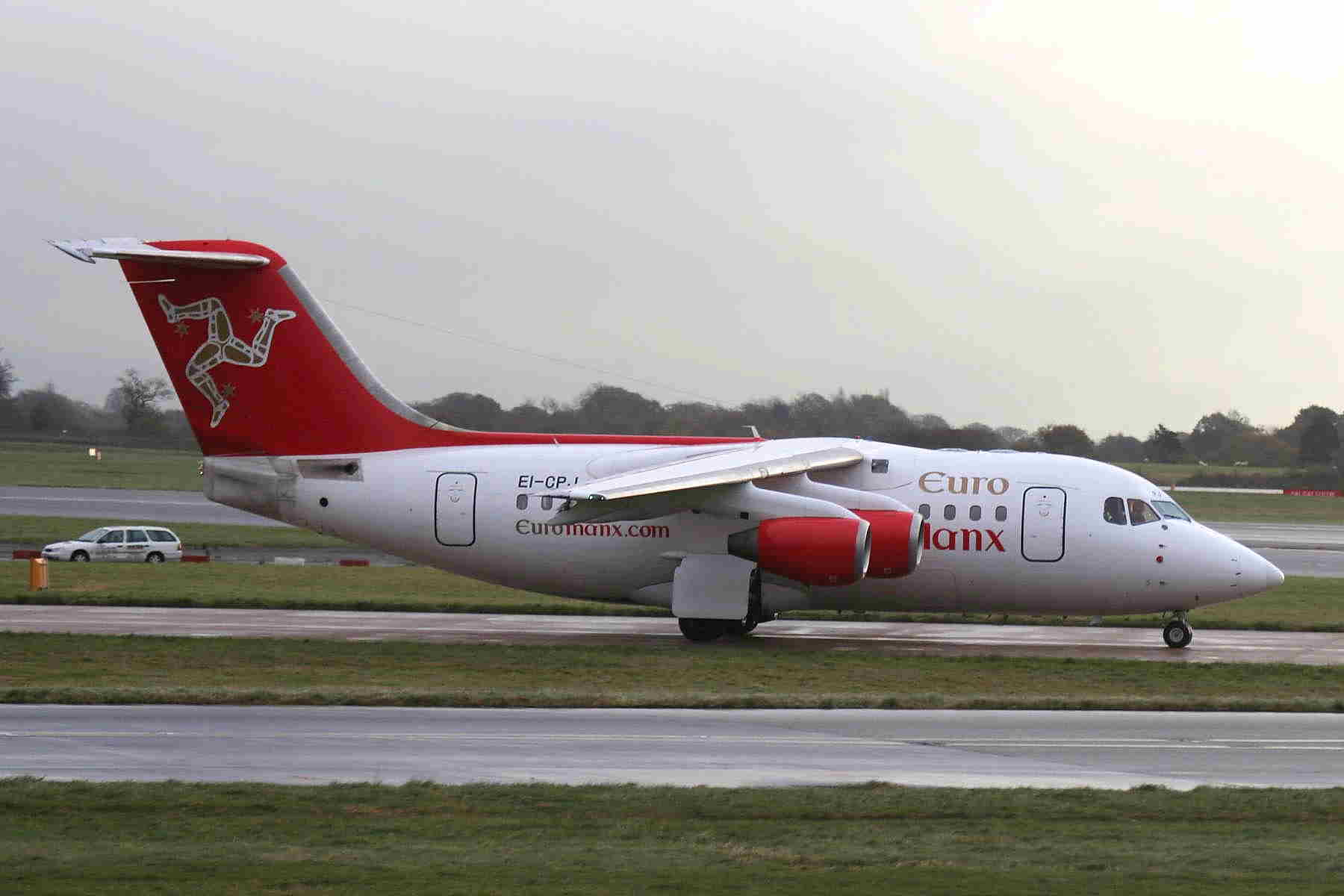
Avro RJ70, 2005

The airline was established by Allan Keen, managing director of Isle of Man-based Woodgate Aviation, on 5 May 2002 and started operations on 19 Augustr. EuroManx initially operated with leased equipment including Beechcraft 1900 and ATR 42 aircraft from Rossair Europe and subsequently Fokker 50s from Denim Air. Corporate Jet Services and UK investors acquired the air carrier fully in September 2004.

EuroManx leased aircraft from various operators during 2005 with two Avro RJ70, two Dornier 328s, a Bombardier Dash 8 Q200 and a Bombardier Dash 8 Q300 aircraft. In June 2005, EuroManx successfully bought the passenger service of Emerald Airways, another regional carrier operating services from Liverpool. These services were operated using an ATR leased from Irish Aer Arann. Competition from Manx2 on the Belfast route increased with this air carrier launching a 10 daily service. In the following October, prior to the arrival of Manx2, EuroManx restructured its operation, shutting down all its scheduled international services except Dublin, and eliminating domestic services to Bristol, Southampton, Glasgow and London Stansted airports. Its RJ70 fleet was announced as retired, however both airframes continued flying until withdrawal in February 2006. At that time, EuroManx restructured again and withdrew from the Dublin route. The Dornier 328 was also withdrawn and operations continued with the remaining two Dash 8 aircraft. Euromanx ceased all operations on 9 May 2008.
