= Collagen, type IV, alpha 1 =

Protein found in humans

COL4A1
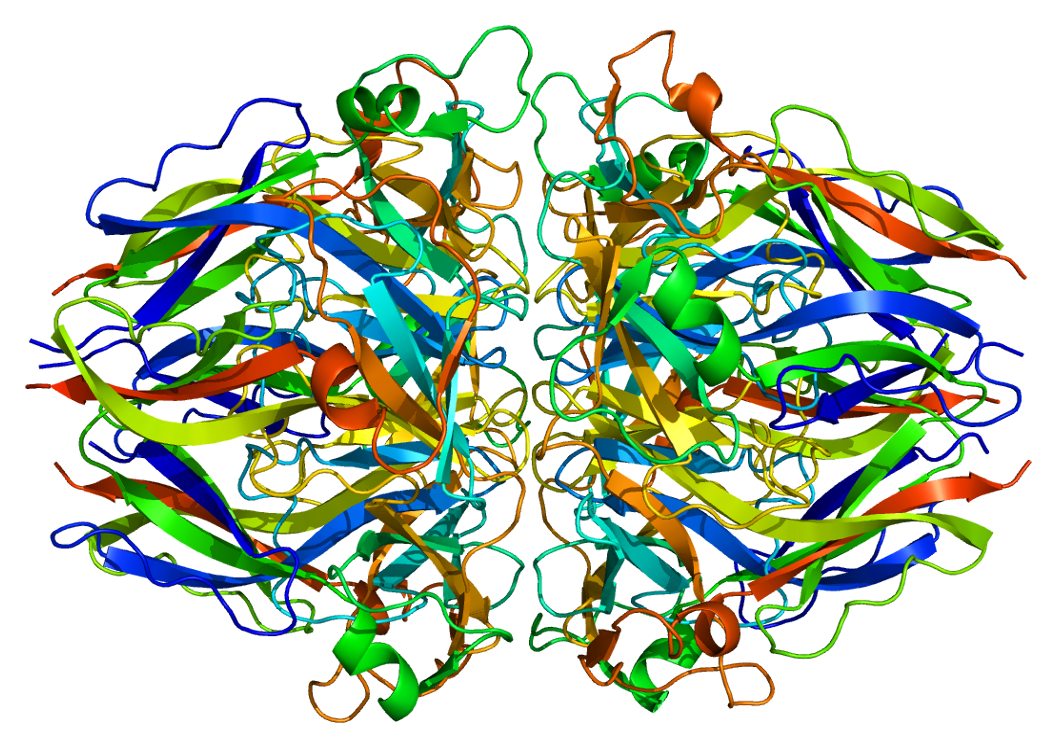

Identifiers
- Aliases: COL4A1, HANAC, ICH, POREN1, arresten, BSVD, RATOR, collagen type IV alpha 1, collagen type IV alpha 1 chain, BSVD1, PADMAL, COL4A1s
- External IDs: OMIM: 120130; MGI: 88454; GeneCards: COL4A1
Available structures
PDB	Ortholog search: PDBe RCSB
PDB	List of PDB id codes 1LI1

Gene location (Human)
Chr.	Chromosome 13 (human)
Band	13q34	Start	110,148,963 bp
Band	13q34	End	110,307,157 bp

Gene location (Mouse)
Chr.	Chromosome 8 (mouse)
Band	8 A1.1|8 5.53 cM	Start	11,248,423 bp
Band	8 A1.1|8 5.53 cM	End	11,362,826 bp
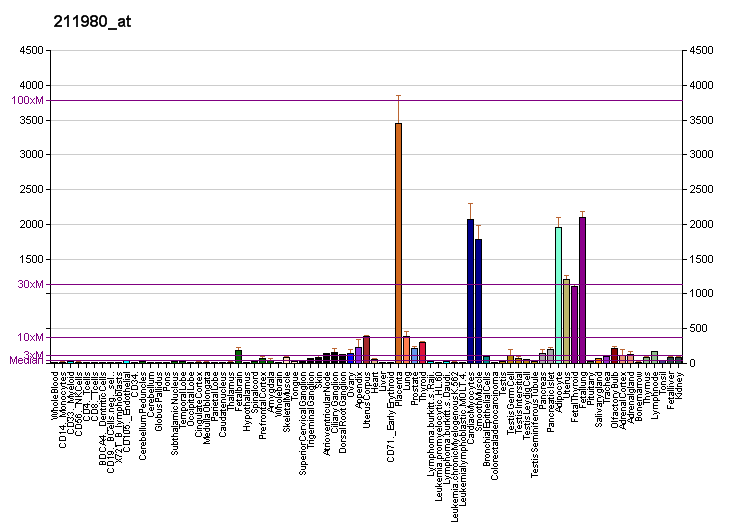

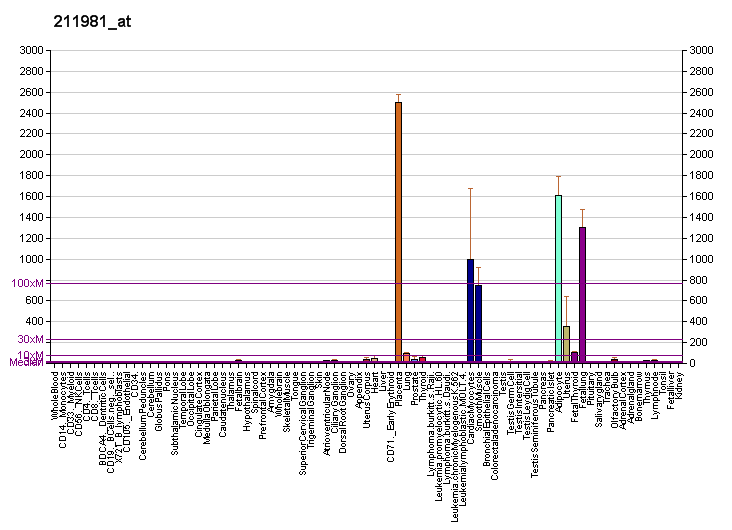
RNA expression pattern
Bgee	Human / Mouse (ortholog); Top expressed in: visceral pleura; placenta; right coronary artery; decidua; stromal cell of endometrium; left coronary artery; epithelium of colon; popliteal artery; tibial arteries; abdominal fat / Top expressed in: epithelium of lens; left lung lobe; ascending aorta; umbilical cord; endothelial cell of lymphatic vessel; sciatic nerve; internal carotid artery; aortic valve; external carotid artery; vas deferens; More reference expression data
BioGPS	More reference expression data
Gene ontology
Molecular function	extracellular matrix constituent conferring elasticity; extracellular matrix structural constituent; protein binding; platelet-derived growth factor binding; extracellular matrix structural constituent conferring tensile strength
Cellular component	collagen; endoplasmic reticulum lumen; extracellular matrix; collagen type IV trimer; extracellular region; basement membrane; extracellular space; collagen-containing extracellular matrix
Biological process	renal tubule morphogenesis; epithelial cell differentiation; blood vessel morphogenesis; extracellular matrix organization; brain development; neuromuscular junction development; angiogenesis; retinal blood vessel morphogenesis; basement membrane organization; branching involved in blood vessel morphogenesis; collagen catabolic process; cellular response to amino acid stimulus; collagen-activated tyrosine kinase receptor signaling pathway
Sources:Amigo / QuickGO
Orthologs
Databases	NCBI: entry; OMA: entry
Species	Human	Mouse
Entrez	1282	12826
Ensembl	ENSG00000187498	ENSMUSG00000031502
UniProt	P02462	P02463
RefSeq (mRNA)	NM_001845; NM_001303110	NM_009931
RefSeq (protein)	NP_001290039; NP_001836	NP_034061
Location (UCSC)	Chr 13: 110.15 – 110.31 Mb	Chr 8: 11.25 – 11.36 Mb
PubMed search
- Wikidata
View/Edit Human	View/Edit Mouse

Collagen alpha-1(IV) chain (COL4A1) is a protein that in humans is encoded by the COL4A1 gene on chromosome 13. It is ubiquitously expressed in many tissues and cell types. COL4A1 is a subunit of the type IV collagen and plays a role in angiogenesis. Mutations in the gene have been linked to diseases of the brain, muscle, kidney, eye, and cardiovascular system. The COL4A1 gene also contains one of 27 SNPs associated with increased risk of coronary artery disease.

== Structure ==
=== Gene ===
The COL4A1 gene resides on chromosome 13 at the band 13q34 and contains 54 exons.[5] This gene produces 2 isoforms through alternative splicing.

=== Protein ===
COL4A1 belongs to the type IV collagen family and contains three domains: a short N-terminal domain, a long triple-helical 7S domain at its center, and a non-collagenous 1 (NC1) domain at its C-terminal. The triple-helical domain contains interrupted G-X-Y repeats, which is suspected to allow flexibility of the domain. The NC1 domain is composed of two trimeric caps, each containing two alpha 1 fragments and one alpha 2 fragment, that form a sixfold propeller arranged around an axial tunnel. The interaction between these two caps occurs along a large planar interface and is stabilized by a covalent cross-link between the alpha 1 and alpha 2 chains across the two caps.

== Function ==
Type IV collagen is the major structural component of basement membranes, which contains two or three COL4A1 proteins. Thus, COL4A1 is abundant and found in all types of basement membranes. The NC1 domain of COL4A1 is an important antiangiogenic molecule to control the formation of new capillaries.

== Clinical significance ==
Mutations in COL4A1 exons 24 and 25 are associated with HANAC (autosomal dominant hereditary angiopathy with nephropathy, aneurysms, and muscle cramps). It has also been confirmed that mutations in the COL4A1 gene occur in some patients with porencephaly and schizencephaly.

In humans, a novel mutation of the COL4A1 gene coding for collagen type IV was found to be associated with autosomal dominant congenital cataract in a Chinese family. This mutation was not found in unaffected family members or in 200 unrelated controls. In this study, sequence analysis confirmed that the Gly782 amino acid residue was highly conserved. This report of a new mutation in the COL4A1 gene is the first report of a non-syndromic autosomal dominant congenital cataract that highlights an important role for collagen type IV in the physiological and optical properties of the lens.

Additionally, in the cardiovascular field, the COL4A1 and COL4A2 regions on chromosome 13q34 are a highly replicated locus for coronary artery disease. In a normal wall of arteries, collagen type IV acts to inhibit smooth muscle cell proliferation. Accordingly, it was demonstrated that protein expression of collagen type IV in human vascular smooth muscle cells is regulated by both SMAD3 protein and TGFβ mediated stimulation of mRNA. Altogether, it was concluded that the pathogenesis of coronary artery disease may be regulated by COL4A1 and COL4A2 genes.

An autosomal recessive encephalopathy associated with mutations in this gene has also been reported.

=== Clinical Marker ===
A multi-locus genetic risk score study based on a combination of 27 loci, including the COL4A1 gene, identified individuals at increased risk for both incident and recurrent coronary artery disease events, as well as an enhanced clinical benefit from statin therapy. The study was based on a community cohort study (the Malmo Diet and Cancer study) and four additional randomized controlled trials of primary prevention cohorts (JUPITER and ASCOT) and secondary prevention cohorts (CARE and PROVE IT-TIMI 22).
