= Hereditary angiopathy with nephropathy, aneurysms, and muscle cramps syndrome =

- Other names: HANAC
- Specialty: Medical genetics
- Causes: Mutation in COL4A1 gene
- Diagnostic method: Genetic testing
- Frequency: 0.0001%

Hereditary angiopathy with nephropathy, aneurysms and muscle cramps syndrome (HANAC ) is a rare genetic, multisystemic, COL4A1-related disorder, it is characterized by angiopathy, nephropathy, hematuria, development of kidney cysts, intracranial aneurysms (which have the potential to burst), childhood-onset muscle cramps, urinal, heart and ocular problems. Half of the people with this disorder (50%) have leukoencephalopathy, while a very small number of people with this disorder have Raynaud's phenomenon.

== Causes ==
This syndrome is caused by mutations in the COL4A1 gene, on the chromosome 13q34, this gene provides instructions for making one of the components necessary for the formation of a protein called type IV collagen, this protein is one of the main components for basement membranes throughout the body.

The mutations of the gene causes the production of a protein that alters the structure of collagen type IV, because of this, the collagen molecules can't attach themselves to the basement membranes, and, without these networks, they turn unstable and thus weaken surrounding tissues, explaining the weakening of vasculature of ocular, renal, cerebral and muscular tissues.

This disorder run in families following an autosomal dominant inheritance pattern

== Epidemiology ==
Although the exact prevalence of this disorder isn't known, only six families affected by this disorder have been recorded in medical literature.
