= EMX1 =

Protein-coding gene in the species Homo sapiens

Identifiers
- Aliases: EMX1, empty spiracles homeobox 1
- External IDs: OMIM: 600034; MGI: 95387; GeneCards: EMX1

Gene location (Human)
Chr.	Chromosome 2 (human)
Band	2p13.2	Start	72,916,260 bp
Band	2p13.2	End	72,936,071 bp

Gene location (Mouse)
Chr.	Chromosome 6 (mouse)
Band	6 C3|6 37.21 cM	Start	85,164,420 bp
Band	6 C3|6 37.21 cM	End	85,181,444 bp
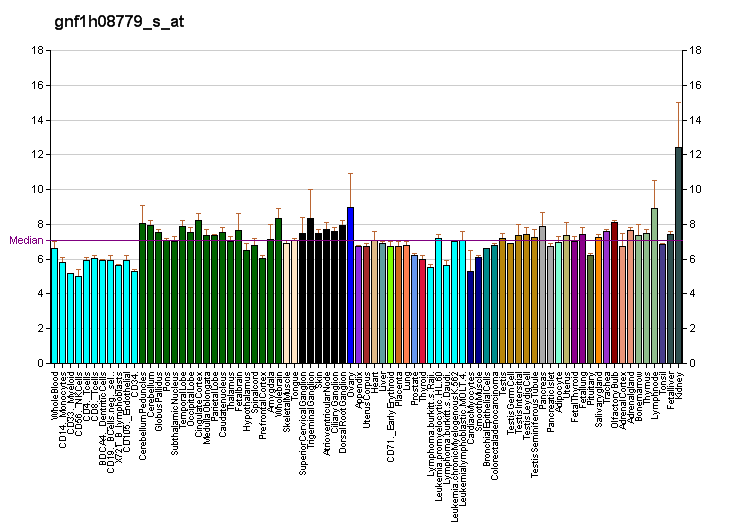

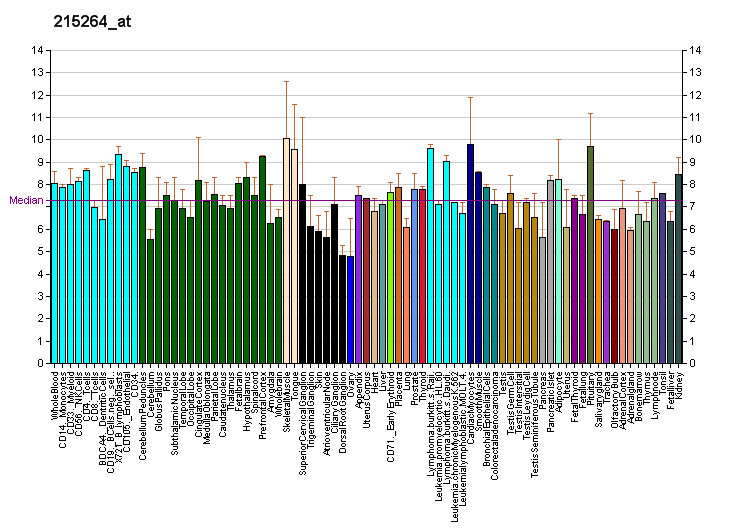
RNA expression pattern
Bgee	Human / Mouse (ortholog); Top expressed in: ganglionic eminence; ventricular zone; oocyte; gonad; right frontal lobe; human kidney; Brodmann area 9; prefrontal cortex; cingulate gyrus; anterior cingulate cortex / Top expressed in: ventricular zone; Subplate; primary visual cortex; right kidney; superior frontal gyrus; otic vesicle; dentate gyrus of hippocampal formation granule cell; renal cortex; human kidney; proximal tubule; More reference expression data
BioGPS	More reference expression data
Gene ontology
Molecular function	sequence-specific DNA binding; DNA binding; protein binding; DNA-binding transcription factor activity, RNA polymerase II-specific
Cellular component	cytoplasm; nucleus; nucleolus
Biological process	regulation of transcription, DNA-templated; homeostasis of number of cells; cerebral cortex regionalization; in utero embryonic development; post-embryonic development; neuron projection extension; neuroepithelial cell differentiation; radial glial cell differentiation; multicellular organism development; regulation of oligodendrocyte progenitor proliferation; telencephalon development; brain development; neuron differentiation; cerebral cortex development; cerebral cortex neuron differentiation; brain morphogenesis; regulation of transcription by RNA polymerase II
Sources:Amigo / QuickGO
Orthologs
Databases	NCBI: entry; OMA: entry
Species	Human	Mouse
Entrez	2016	13796
Ensembl	ENSG00000135638	ENSMUSG00000033726
UniProt	Q04741	Q04742
RefSeq (mRNA)	NM_001040404; NM_004097	NM_010131
RefSeq (protein)	NP_004088	NP_034261
Location (UCSC)	Chr 2: 72.92 – 72.94 Mb	Chr 6: 85.16 – 85.18 Mb
PubMed search
- Wikidata
View/Edit Human	View/Edit Mouse

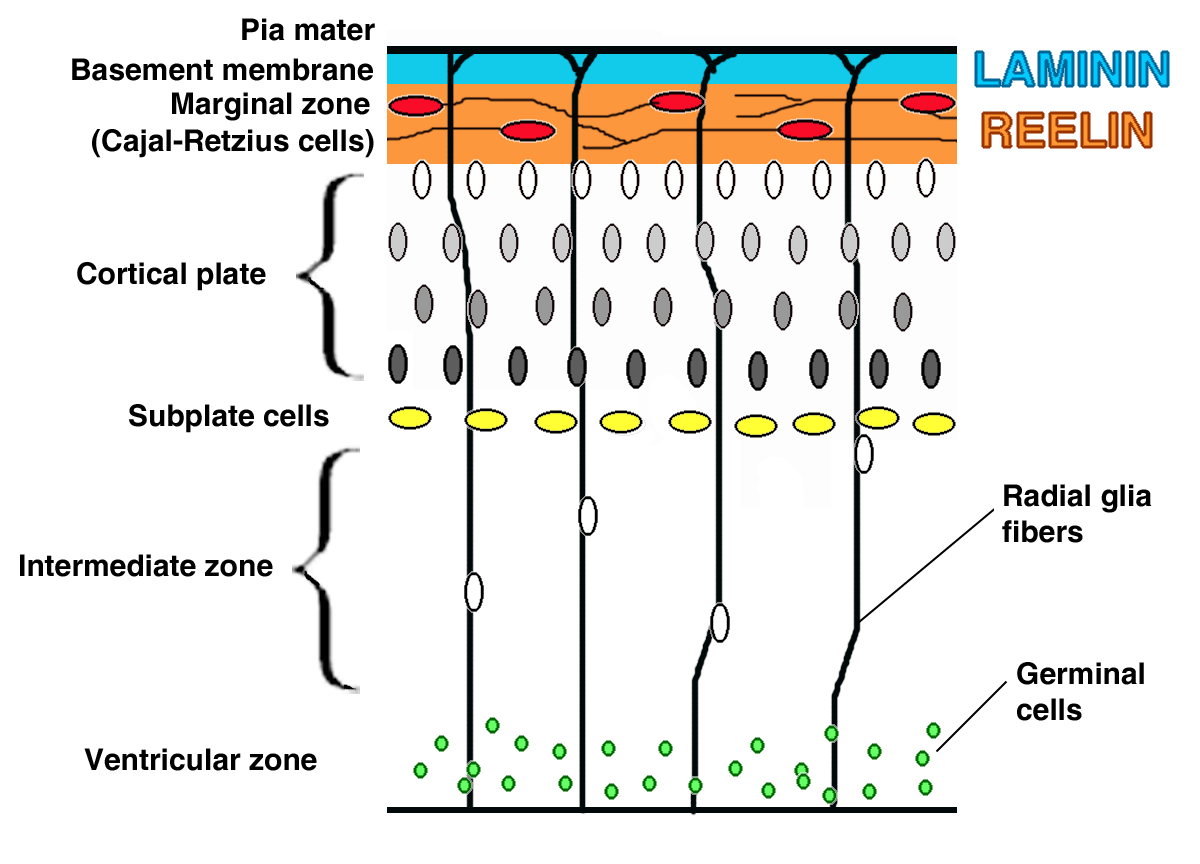
Corticogenesis in a mouse brain. Subplate neurons are coloured yellow.

Homeobox protein EMX1 is a protein that in humans is encoded by the EMX1 gene. The transcribed EMX1 gene is a member of the EMX family of transcription factors. The EMX1 gene, along with its family members, are expressed in the developing cerebrum (also known as the telencephalon). EMX1 plays a role in specification of positional identity, the proliferation of neural stem cells, differentiation of layer-specific neuronal phenotypes and commitment to a neuronal or glial cell fate.

== Function ==
The precise function of the Emx1 transcription factor is not known, however its ubiquitous nature throughout corticogenesis suggests it may confer cellular identity to cortical neurons.

Emx -/- (mice that have had Emx1 gene knocked out) are still viable and display only slight defects. These defects are restricted to the forebrain. Histologically and molecularly, the structures of the cerebral cortex appear to be normal. The hippocampus in Emx1 -/- mice, however, is typically smaller. The major deficit in Emx1-/- mice is that they completely lack the corpus callosum.

== Tissue distribution ==
Most of Emx1 transcript is detected in cell nuclei of the developing telencephalon, including the prospective cerebral cortex, olfactory bulbs and hippocampus. Emx1 is present in practically all cortical neurons during proliferation, migration, differentiation and maturation. However, the amount of Emx 1 varies. Emx1 first appears at E9.5 in its respective mRNA, until E11.5. After this, the Emx1 signal becomes particularly potent in the ventricular zone (VZ) until E17.5. At birth and shortly thereafter, Emx1 levels in layers V and VI as well as in the SP increase.

== Telencephalic development ==
Emx1 and Emx2 each play a critical role in regulating dorsal telencephalic development and are amongst the earliest expressed pallial-specific genes.

During embryonic development, the telencephalon is the birthplace of a diverse collection of neuronal and glial cells. These cells undergo varying patterns of cell migration in order to reach their final positions in what will become the mature cerebral cortex and basal ganglia. The embryonic telencephalon is subdivided into dorsal pallium and ventral subpallium. These two pallia become the mammalian cerebral cortex and basal ganglia, respectively.

The dorsal telencephalon is then further divided into:

Dorsal Telencephalic Subdivisions	Basic Developmental Role
Medial Pallium (MP)	Gives rise to archicortex, including the hippocampus.
Dorsal Pallium (DP)	Foundation of the neocortex.
Lateral Pallium (LP)	Generates the olfactory cortex
Ventral Pallium (VP)	Claustromygdaloid complex generated here.

Each of the aforementioned pallial domains will give rise to a distinct neuroanatomical region of the developed human brain.

The ventral telencephalon can also be subdivided into two distinguishable progenitor domains:

Ventral Telencephalic Subdivision	Role
Lateral Ganglionic Eminence (LGE)	Generates the striatum.
Medial Ganglionic Eminence (MGE)	Generates the pallidum.

The dorsal and ventral telencephalic domains can be distinguished embryonically through distinct gene expression patterns. These genes are regionally restricted and take part in identity specification of the area of the telencephalon in which they are expressed.

Developmental targets of the embryonic telencephalon.

=== Role in the mouse embryo ===
Emx1 expression has been shown to start from E9.5 (see gestational age). In the developing mouse embryo, the Emx genes are expressed principally in extended regions of the developing rostral brain, including the cerebral cortex, olfactory bulbs and olfactory epithelium. Emx1 gene expression is constricted to the dorsal telencephalon.

From E9.5 until post-natal stages, Emx1 expression is associated with cortical neurogenesis, differentiation and migration, and synaptic connection generation. This suggests that Emx1 plays a crucial role in determining the identity of the developing cortex. Emx1 is not only limited to the telencephalon, rather it is also expressed in branchial patterns and in the apical ectodermal ridge of the developing limbs.

=== Developing forebrain ===
At E9.5, Emx1 expression can be witnessed within the dorsal telencephalon slightly anterior to the boundary between the diencephalon and telencephalon Emx1 is expressed in most cortical neurons within the developing telencephalon.

Expression can be seen irrespective of whether the neurons are proliferating, migrating or differentiating. This means that in the developed cerebral cortex, the transcript for Emx1 is widely distributed. While distribution of the transcript may be seen throughout the developed cortex, the transcript intensity varies greatly according to developmental time. For example, the transcript for Emx1 is shown to be stronger in the ventricular zone (VZ) between E10.5 and E17.5. However, around birth and immediately thereafter, the Emx1 transcript is absent from the marginal zone (MZ), only becoming stronger in cortical layers V and VI as well as subset subplate (SP) neurons.

In cortical layers V and VI as well as the SP neurons, Emx1 might take part in development of early functional circuitry, as well as in defining specific cellular identities.

The distribution of Emx1 is so ubiquitous in the developing brain that in mid- and late-gestation embryos, as well as postnatal mice, it is found in cerebral cortex, olfactory bulbs, dentate gyrus and hippocampus.

== Regulation by Gli3 ==
The Gli3 zinc finger transcription factor has been shown to play a role as a regulator of Emx1. In Gli3 Extra-toes mutants, the transcription factor Gli3 is mutated and as a result, Emx1 and Emx2 gene expression is lost.
