= EMX2 =

Protein-coding gene in the species Homo sapiens

Identifiers
- Aliases: EMX2, empty spiracles homeobox 2
- External IDs: OMIM: 600035; MGI: 95388; GeneCards: EMX2

Gene location (Mouse)
Chr.	Chromosome 19 (mouse)
Band	19 D3|19 56.28 cM	Start	59,446,804 bp
Band	19 D3|19 56.28 cM	End	59,453,789 bp
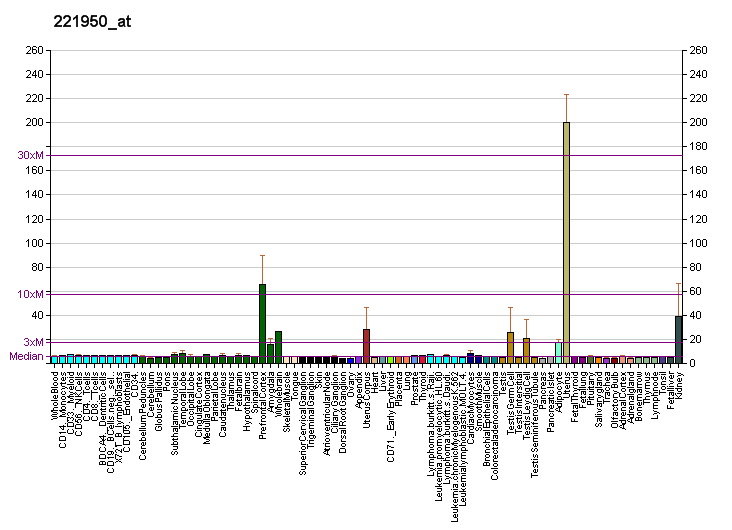
RNA expression pattern
Bgee	Human / Mouse (ortholog); Top expressed in: corpus epididymis; caput epididymis; seminal vesicula; ganglionic eminence; canal of the cervix; kidney tubule; myometrium; right uterine tube; endometrium; germinal epithelium / Top expressed in: fallopian tube; cervix; ventricular zone; vestibular membrane of cochlear duct; gastrula; connecting tubule; vas deferens; ovary; upper respiratory tract; nose; More reference expression data
BioGPS	More reference expression data
Gene ontology
Molecular function	sequence-specific DNA binding; DNA binding; protein binding; DNA-binding transcription factor activity, RNA polymerase II-specific
Cellular component	nucleus
Biological process	cerebral cortex development; multicellular organism development; regulation of gene expression; renal system development; forebrain development; brain development; regulation of transcription, DNA-templated; cell proliferation in forebrain; forebrain cell migration; cerebral cortex regionalization; neuron differentiation; anterior/posterior pattern specification; dentate gyrus development; regulation of transcription by RNA polymerase II; ureter morphogenesis
Sources:Amigo / QuickGO
Orthologs
Databases	NCBI: entry
Species	Human	Mouse
Entrez	2018	13797
Ensembl	n/a	ENSMUSG00000043969
UniProt	Q04743	Q04744
RefSeq (mRNA)	NM_004098; NM_001165924	NM_010132
RefSeq (protein)	NP_001159396; NP_004089	NP_034262
Location (UCSC)	n/a	Chr 19: 59.45 – 59.45 Mb
PubMed search
- Wikidata
View/Edit Human	View/Edit Mouse

Homeobox protein Emx2 is a protein that in humans is encoded by the EMX2 gene.

== Function ==
The homeodomain transcription factor EMX2 is critical for central nervous system and urogenital development. EMX1 (MIM 600034) and EMX2 are related to the 'empty spiracles' gene expressed in the developing Drosophila head.[supplied by OMIM].

The EMX2 gene encodes for a transcription factor that is a homolog to Drosophila melanogaster “empty spiracles” gene. The “empty spiracles gene” is needed for the proper head development/formation as well as the development of posterior spiracles in Drosophila melanogaster.

In humans, EMX2 shows high expression in the dorsal telencephalon, olfactory neuroepithelium, as well as the urogenital system. In the developing uroepithelium, EMX2 is negatively regulated by HOXA10. EMX2 has been associated with Schizencephaly, a disease where there are large parts of the brain hemispheres absent and that are replaced with cerebrospinal fluid, clinical observations can include seizures, blindness, and inability to walk/speak. EMX2 has also been shown to have an important role in tumorigenesis. One study found that the expression of EMX2 is significantly decreased in tissues and cells with colorectal cancer. It is suspected that EMX2 could be used as a treatment of colorectal cancer.

== See also ==
- EMX1
